= Gates =

Gates is the plural of gate, a point of entry to a space which is enclosed by walls. It may also refer to:

== People ==
- Gates (surname), various people with the last name
- Gates Brown (1939-2013), American Major League Baseball player
- Gates McFadden (born 1949), American actress and choreographer
- Gates P. Thruston (1835-1912), American Civil War veteran, lawyer and businessman

== Places ==
=== Canada ===
- Gates, British Columbia, Canada, a rural community
  - Gates River, a river in British Columbia
  - Gates Valley, a valley in British Columbia
  - Gates Lake, at the head of the Gates River

=== United States ===
- Gates, Nebraska, an unincorporated community
- Gates, New York, a town
  - Gates (CDP), New York, census-designated place
- Gates, Oregon, a city
- Gates, Tennessee, a town
- Gates County, North Carolina, United States
  - Gates, North Carolina, an unincorporated community in the county
- Gates Pass, Arizona, a mountain pass

== Arts and entertainment ==
- Gates (band), a post rock band from New Jersey
- Gates (TV series), a 2012 UK situation comedy television series
- Gates (character), a fictional character, an insectoid member of the Legion of Super-Heroes
- The Gates (2010 TV series), an American supernatural crime drama television series on ABC
- The Gates (2025 TV series), a planned American daytime television soap opera on CBS
- The Gates (2022 film), an Irish period horror thriller film
- The Gates (2026 film), an American thriller film
- The Gates, an art installation by Christo and Jeanne-Claude in Central Park in New York City

== Other uses ==
- Gates Airport (disambiguation)
- Gates Bar-B-Q, a restaurant in Kansas City, Missouri
- Gates Corporation, a manufacturer of power transmission belts and fluid power products

== See also ==
- Bill & Melinda Gates Foundation
- Gates Learjet, former name of aircraft manufacturer Learjet Corporation
- USS Thomas S. Gates (CG-51), a US Navy cruiser
- Gate (disambiguation)
- The Gate (disambiguation)
- Gating (disambiguation)
- Gaetz, a homophonous surname
