= Gate (disambiguation) =

A gate is an opening in a wall or fence fitted with a moveable barrier allowing it to be closed.

Gate or GATE may also refer to:

== Arts, entertainment, and media ==
- Gate (film), a 2018 South Korean film
- Gåte, a Norwegian band
  - Gåte EP, by the eponymous band
- Gate (album), a 1995 album by Peter Frohmader
- Gate (novel series), a 2006/2010 novel series by Takumi Yanai, with comic (manga, 2011) and television (anime, 2015) adaptations
- Gate (solitaire), a card game
- GATE (video game), a 1991 action-adventure video game
- Grammy, Academy, Tony, and Emmy Awards, or "GATE Awards", see List of people who have won Academy, Emmy, Grammy, and Tony Awards

== Engineering ==
=== Electronics ===
- Gate (transistor), terminal of a field effect transistor
- Logic gate, a functional building block in digital logic such as "and", "or", or "not"
- Metal gate, the gate material in a MOSFET transistor
- Noise gate, audio squelch control for reducing noise
- Range gate, the area encompassed by one pixel of radar data

=== Equipment ===
- Gate, a rowing term for the hinged bar that prevents the oar from coming out
- Gate, a sprue molding channel which carries molten metal into a mold
- Gate, a sprung safety latch on a lifting hook or carabiner

=== Hydraulics ===
- Gate (hydraulic engineering), a movable structure used to control the flow of fluid in a pipe or channel
- Gate (water transport), the watertight door that seals off a chamber of a lock
- Floodgate, an adjustable gate used to control water flow in flood barriers, lake, river, stream, or levee systems
- Gate valve, a valve that opens by lifting a wedge out of the path of the fluid

== Sport ==
- Gate, used in slalom skiing

== Enterprises and organizations ==
- GATE (organization), an organization working on gender identity and sex characteristics issues
- Gate Studios, a British film studio in operation from 1928 to the early 1950s
- Gate Theatre, in Dublin
- Gay Alliance Toward Equality, or "GATE", one of the first Canadian gay liberation groups
- Gate Petroleum, a Jacksonville-based petroleum company
- Grupo de Ações Táticas Especiais (Portuguese for "Special Tactical Actions Group"), a Brazilian police special forces squad

== Places ==
- Gate, Arkansas
- Gate, Oklahoma
- Gate, Washington
- Gate City, Virginia
- Gate District, St. Louis

== Science and technology ==
- Gate (cytometry), a set of limits for data from a cytometer
- Film gate, the opening in the front of a motion picture camera
- Gallium(II) telluride, a chemical compound with the formula GaTe
- General Architecture for Text Engineering, or "GATE", a human language processing system
- Quantum gate, a basic quantum mechanics operation that has properties of a classical logic gate

== Other uses ==
- Gate (airport), a specified location for boarding or leaving an aircraft in an airport
- Gate (surname), people and characters with the surname
- Gate receipts (or "event gate"), the sum of ticket revenue for a particular event at a sporting venue
- Gifted education, also known as Gifted and Talented Education, or "GATE"
- Graduate Aptitude Test in Engineering, or "GATE", an entrance examination for admission to postgraduate courses in India

== See also ==
- List of "-gate" scandals and controversies
- The Gate (disambiguation)
- Gates (disambiguation)
- Gait (disambiguation)
- Gating (disambiguation)
