= Gater (surname) =

Gater is a surname, and may refer to:

- George Gater (1886–1963), British Army officer and civil servant
- John Gater (born before 1979), British archaeological geophysicist
- Roy Gater (1940–2017), English footballer

== See also ==
- Gates (surname)
- Gate (surname)
