= Gating =

Gating may refer to:

== Neurobiology ==
- Gating (electrophysiology), the opening (activation) or closing (deactivation) of ion channels
- Sensory gating, an automatic process by which the brain adjusts to stimuli
- Synaptic gating, neural circuits suppressing inputs through synapses

== Technology ==
- Gating (telecommunication), a process of selectively modifying signals
- Gating system metalwork, a process in casting
- Gating signal, a signal that provides a time window
- Clock gating, a power-saving techniques used in synchronous circuits
- Power gating, a power-saving technique for circuits
- Noise gate, a term in audio signal processing
- Frequency-resolved optical gating, a term related to auto correlation in optics
- Gating (cytometry), manually selecting a population during flow cytometry analysis
- Gating mechanism, an architectural motif in neural networks.

== See also ==
- Gate (disambiguation)
- Gates (disambiguation)
