= Gates (surname) =

Gates is a surname or English, German, Ashkenazi or French origin.

In England it can be related to someone living by or guarding a Gate, see also Yates. In the USA it can be an americanization of Götz or Katz. It can be an americanization of the French family name Barrière.

== Gates family ==
The Gates family of Seattle, Washington. Members of this family include:

- Bill Gates (born 1955), co-founder of Microsoft and Bill & Melinda Gates Foundation
- Mary Maxwell Gates (1929–1994), American philanthropist, Bill's mother
- Melinda French Gates (born 1964), American philanthropist, ex-wife of Bill Gates
- Mimi Gardner Gates (born 1942), American art historian, William Sr.'s second wife
- William H. Gates, Sr. (1925–2020), American attorney and philanthropist, Bill's father

== Academics ==
- Ann Gates, American computer scientist
- Carolyn Gates, professor of veterinary science in New Zealand
- Frank Caleb Gates (1887–1955), American botanist and plant ecologist
- George Augustus Gates (1851–1912), American Congregational minister and university administrator
- Henry Louis Gates, Jr. (born 1950), American scholar
- Merrill Edward Gates, American scholar
- Robert McFarland Gates (1883–1962), American engineer
- Sylvester James Gates, American theoretical physicist

== Arts and entertainment ==
- Adelia Sarah Gates (1825–1912), American botanical artist and travel writer
- Crawford Gates, American composer and musician
- David Gates (born 1940), singer-songwriter
- Debbie Gates, British television writer-producer
- Deborah Gates, American actress
- Frank E. Gates (1863–1952), American scenic designer
- Frank P. Gates (1895–1975), American architect
- Gareth Gates, British pop musician
- Giacomo Gates, American jazz musician
- Ken Gates, pseudonym for American voice actor Rodger Parsons
- Kevin Gates (born 1986), American rapper
- Larry Gates, American actor
- Lee Gates (1937–2020), American blues guitarist, singer, and songwriter
- Nancy Gates (1926–2019), American actress
- Richard H. Gates (1872–1964), American scenic designer
- Robert Franklin Gates) (1906–1982), American artist and professor
- Synyster Gates, American guitarist
- Tucker Gates, American television director

== Business ==
- Charles Gates, Jr. (1921–2005), of the Gates Rubber Company
- Charles Gilbert Gates (1876–1913), American stock broker
- John Warne Gates, American industrialist
- William Thomas George Gates (1908–1990), businessman

== Military ==
- Artemus Gates (1895–1976), American financier and Undersecretary of the Navy during World War II
- George Gates (RAF officer) (1899–1975), British World War I flying ace
- Horatio Gates (1726–1806), Revolutionary War American general
- John Gates (courtier), 16th century English soldier and courtier
- Julius W. Gates, onetime Sergeant Major of the U.S. Army
- Raydon Gates, Australian navy admiral
- Robert Gates (born 1943), former president of Texas A&M, former CIA director, 22nd United States Secretary of Defense

== Political figures and civil servants ==
- Charles W. Gates (1856–1927), 20th century governor of Vermont
- Christopher T. Gates, American political activist and philanthropist
- Daryl Gates (1926–2010), American police officer best known as Los Angeles police chief
- Francis H. Gates (1839–1925), New York state senator
- John Gates (1913 – 1992,) American political activist
- Mickey Gates (born 1959), member of the Arkansas House of Representatives
- Nathaniel H. Gates (1811–1889), American lawyer and politician
- Ralph F. Gates (1893–1978), governor of Indiana 1945–1949
- Rick Gates (political consultant), American political consultant and lobbyist
- Seth Merrill Gates (1800–1877), 19th century American politician
- Thomas Gates (disambiguation), several people
  - Sir Thomas Gates (governor) (1585–1621), Governor of colonial Virginia
  - Thomas S. Gates, Jr. (1906–1983), American politician

== Religion ==
- Blanche Gates (1918–2023), Canadian Anglican liturgist
- Frederick Taylor Gates (1853–1929), American Baptist minister and advisor to the Rockefeller family
- George Augustus Gates (1851–1912), American Congregational minister and university administrator
- Theophilus Gates (1787–1846), American religious leader

== Sports ==
- Antonio Gates (born 1980), American football player
- Barbara Gates (1934–2000), American baseball player
- Bobby Gates (born 1985), American golf player
- Brent Gates (born 1970), American professional baseball player
- Clyde Gates (born 1986), American football player
- DeMarquis Gates (born 1996), American football player
- Frank Gates (basketball player) (1920–1978), American professional basketball player
- George Gates (footballer) (1883–1960), English footballer
- Hilliard Gates, American sports journalist
- Kaiser Gates (born 1996), American basketball player for Hapoel Jerusalem of the Israeli Basketball Premier League
- Leonard Gates (born 1970), American darts player
- Lionel Gates (born 1982), American football player
- Mathew Gates (born 1975), American figure skater
- Pop Gates (1917–1999), American basketball player
- Vickie Gates (born 1962), American female bodybuilder
- Yancy Gates (born 1989), American basketball player

== Writers ==
- David Gates (author) (born 1947), author and journalist
- J. Gabriel Gates, American author

== Other people ==
- Charles H. Gates (1854–1933), American frontiersman
- Ivan R. Gates (1890–1932), American aviator and entrepreneur
- Phyllis Gates, wife of Rock Hudson
- Rick Gates (Internet pioneer), American software developer

== Fictional characters ==
- Conrad Gates, fictional British television character
- Elsa Gates, fictional British television character
- Jack Gates, fictional British television character
- Tony Gates, fictional American television character
- William Gates (basketball), protagonist from the 1994 movie Hoop Dreams
- Benjamin Franklin Gates, in the National Treasure franchise, played by Nicolas Cage
- (Unknown) Gates, fictional anime character

== See also ==
- Gaetz, surname
- Gate (surname)
