= The Gate =

The Gate may refer to:

== Places ==
- The Gate (California), a mountain gap in Siskiyou County, California, United States.
- The Gate (Gunnison County, Colorado), a canyon narrows in Gunnison County, Colorado, United States.
- The Gate (Saguache County, Colorado), a canyon narrows in Saguache County, Colorado, United States.
- The Gate, Malton, closed pub in England
- The Gate, Newcastle, an entertainment venue in Newcastle upon Tyne, England
- The Gate Arts Centre, Cardiff, Wales
- The Gate Shams Abu Dhabi, a development project in Abu Dhabi

== Literature ==
- The Gate (novel), a 1910 novel by Japanese author Natsume Sōseki
- The Gate (autobiography), a 2003 autobiography by French writer François Bizot

== Film ==
- The Gate (1987 film), a 1987 Canadian horror film
- The Gate (2014 film), a 2014 French film
- The Gates (2022 film), an Irish period horror thriller film
- The Gates (2026 film), an American thriller film

== Music ==
=== Albums ===
- The Gate (Kurt Elling album), a 2011 album by Kurt Elling
- The Gate (Swans album), a 2015 album by Swans

=== Songs ===
- "The Gate" (Sam Roberts song), 2006
- "The Gate" (Björk song), 2017
- "The Gate", by Mike Oldfield from Light & Shade, 2005
- "The Gate", by Caroline Polachek from Pang, 2019

== Other uses ==
- TheGATE.ca, a Canadian entertainment website
- The Gates, an art installation by Christo and Jeanne-Claude in Central Park in New York City
- The Gates (2010 TV series), a 2010 American supernatural crime drama television series on ABC
- The Gates (2025 TV series), a planned 2025 American daytime television soap opera on CBS
- The Báb (1819–1850), which means the "Gate" and is the title taken by the founder of Bábism
- Margate F.C., an English football club, nicknamed 'The Gate'

== See also ==
- Gates (disambiguation)
- Gate (disambiguation)
