= Gates Airport (disambiguation) =

Gates Airport is a public use airport in Garrettsville, Ohio, United States (FAA: 7D8).

Gates Airport may also refer to:

- Davis Airport (Oregon), a public use airport in Gates, Oregon, United States (FAA: 6S4)

== See also ==
- Gate (airport)
