= Thomas Gates =

Thomas Gates may refer to:

- Sir Thomas Gates (governor) (fl. 1585–1621), of the Virginia Company, an early leader and governor of the Colony of Virginia
- Thomas Sovereign Gates (1873–1948), U.S. educator, first president of the University of Pennsylvania
- Thomas S. Gates Jr. (1906–1983), U.S. Secretary of Defense under President Dwight D. Eisenhower
  - USS Thomas S. Gates (CG-51)
- Thomas Gates, 19th-century Tucson, Arizona area pioneer, rancher, and saloonkeeper; Gates Pass is named after him
- Thomas Gates, fictional character in National Treasure and National Treasure: Book of Secrets, portrayed by Jason Earles and Joel Gretsch

== See also ==
- Tom Gates, a British series of books by Liz Pichon
