= Gating (electrophysiology) =

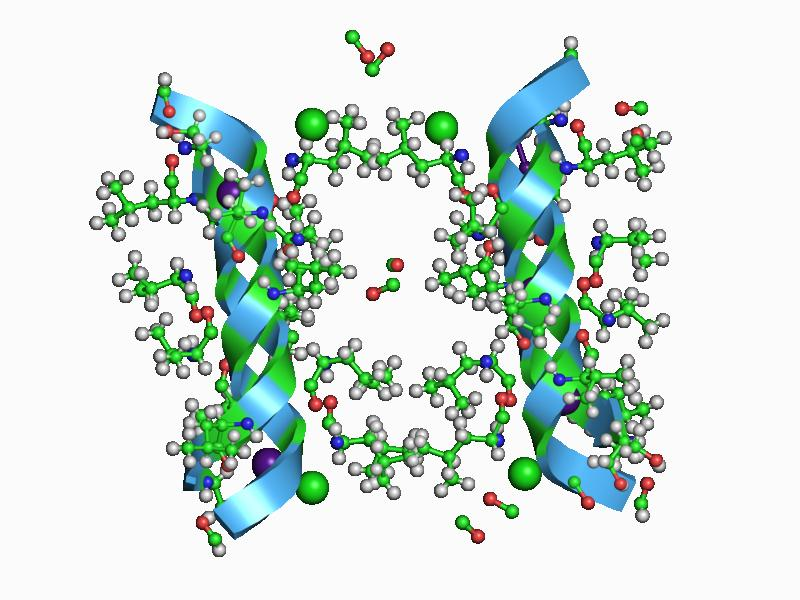
An animated representation of the molecular structure of a simple ion channel

In electrophysiology, the term gating refers to the opening (activation) or closing (by deactivation or inactivation) of ion channels. This change in conformation is a response to changes in transmembrane voltage.

When ion channels are in a 'closed' (non-conducting) state, they are impermeable to ions and do not conduct electrical current. When ion channels are in their open state, they conduct electrical current by allowing specific types of ions to pass through them, and thus, across the plasma membrane of the cell. Gating is the process by which an ion channel transitions between its open and closed states.

A variety of cellular changes can trigger gating, depending on the ion channel, including changes in voltage across the cell membrane (voltage-gated ion channels), chemicals interacting with the ion channel (ligand-gated ion channels), changes in temperature, stretching or deformation of the cell membrane, addition of a phosphate group to the ion channel (phosphorylation), and interaction with other molecules in the cell (e.g., G proteins). The rate at which any of these gating processes occurs in response to these triggers are known as the kinetics of gating. Some drugs and many ion channel toxins act as 'gating modifiers' of voltage-gated ion channels by changing the kinetics of gating.

The voltage-gated ion channels of the action potential are often described as having four gating processes: activation, deactivation, inactivation, and reactivation (also called 'recovery from inactivation'). Activation is the process of opening the activation gate, which occurs in response to the voltage inside the cell membrane (the membrane potential) becoming more positive with respect to the outside of the cell (depolarization), and 'deactivation' is the opposite process of the activation gate closing in response to the inside of the membrane becoming more negative (repolarization). 'Inactivation' is the closing of the inactivation gate, and occurs in response to the voltage inside the membrane becoming more positive, but more slowly than activation. 'Reactivation' is the opposite of inactivation, and is the process of reopening the inactivation gate.

These voltage-dependent changes in function are critical for a large number of processes in excitable and nonexcitable cells.

== Activation ==
=== Voltage-gated ion channels ===
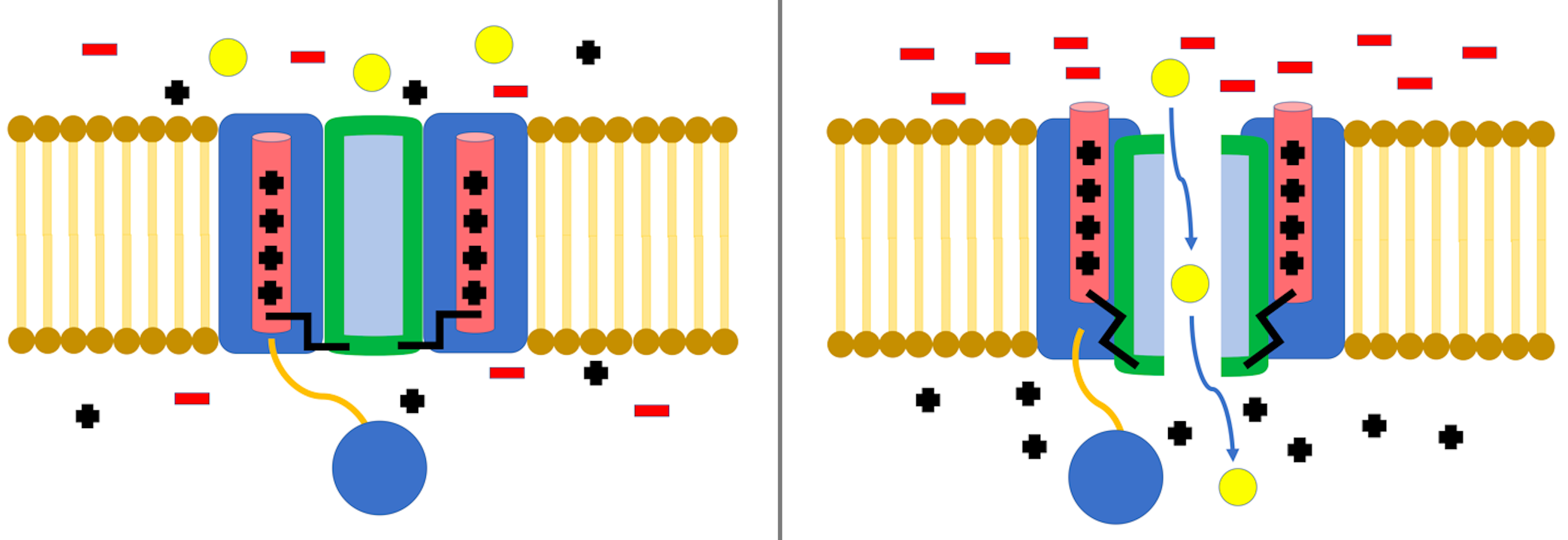
Voltage-gated ion channel. When the membrane is polarized, the voltage sensing domain of the channel shifts, opening the channel to ion flow (ions represented by yellow circles).

Voltage-gated ion channels open and close in response to the electrical potential across the cell membrane. Portions of the channel domain act as voltage sensors. As the membrane potential changes, this results in changes in electrostatic forces, moving these voltage-sensing domains. This changes the conformation of other elements of the channel to either the open or closed position. When they move from the closed position to the open position, this is called "activation." Voltage-gated ion channels underlie many of the electrical behaviors of the cell, including action potentials, resting membrane potentials, and synaptic transmission.

Voltage-gated ion channels are often specific to ions, including Na^{+}, K^{+}, Ca^{2+}, and Cl^{−}. Each of these ions plays an important role in the electrical behavior of the cell. The gates also have unique properties with important physiological implications. For example, Na^{+} channels open and close rapidly, while K^{+} gates open and close much more slowly. The difference in speed between these channels underlies the depolarization and repolarization phases of the action potential.

==== Na^{+} Channels ====
Voltage Gated Sodium (Na^{+}) channels are significant when it comes to propagating the action potentials in neurons and other excitable cells, mostly being used for the propagation of action potential in axons, muscle fibers and the neural somatodendritic compartment. Sodium (Na^{+}) channels are some of the main ion channels responsible for action potentials. Being complex, they are made of bigger α subunits that are then paired with two smaller β subunits. They contain transmembrane segments known as S1-6. The charged S4 segments are the channels voltage sensors. When exposed to a certain minimum potential difference, the S4 segments move across the membrane. This causes movement of the S4-S5 linker, which causes the S5-S6 linker to twist and opens the channel.

==== K^{+} Channels ====
Potassium (K^{+}) channels play a large role in setting the resting membrane potential. When the cell membrane depolarizes, the intracellular part of the channel becomes positively charged, which causes the channel's open configuration to become a more stable state than the closed configuration. There are a few models of potassium channel activation:

- The sliding helix model posits that the potassium channel opens due to a screwing motion by its S4 helix.
- The paddle model posits that the S3 and S4 helices of the channel form "paddles" that move through the depolarized membrane and pull the S5 helix away from the channel's opening.
- The transport model posits that a focused electric field causes charged particles to move across the channel with only a small movement of the S4 helix.
- The model of coordinated movement of helices posits that the S4 and S5 helices both rotate, and the S4-S5 linker causes the S6 helix to move, opening the channel.
- The consensus model is an average of the above models that helps reconcile them with experimental data.

==== Ca^{2+} Channels ====
Calcium (Ca^{2+}) channels regulate the release of neurotransmitters at synapses, control the shape of action potentials made by sodium channels, and in some neurons, generate action potentials. Calcium channels consist of six transmembrane helices. S4 acts as the voltage sensor by rotating when exposed to certain membrane potentials, thereby opening the channel.

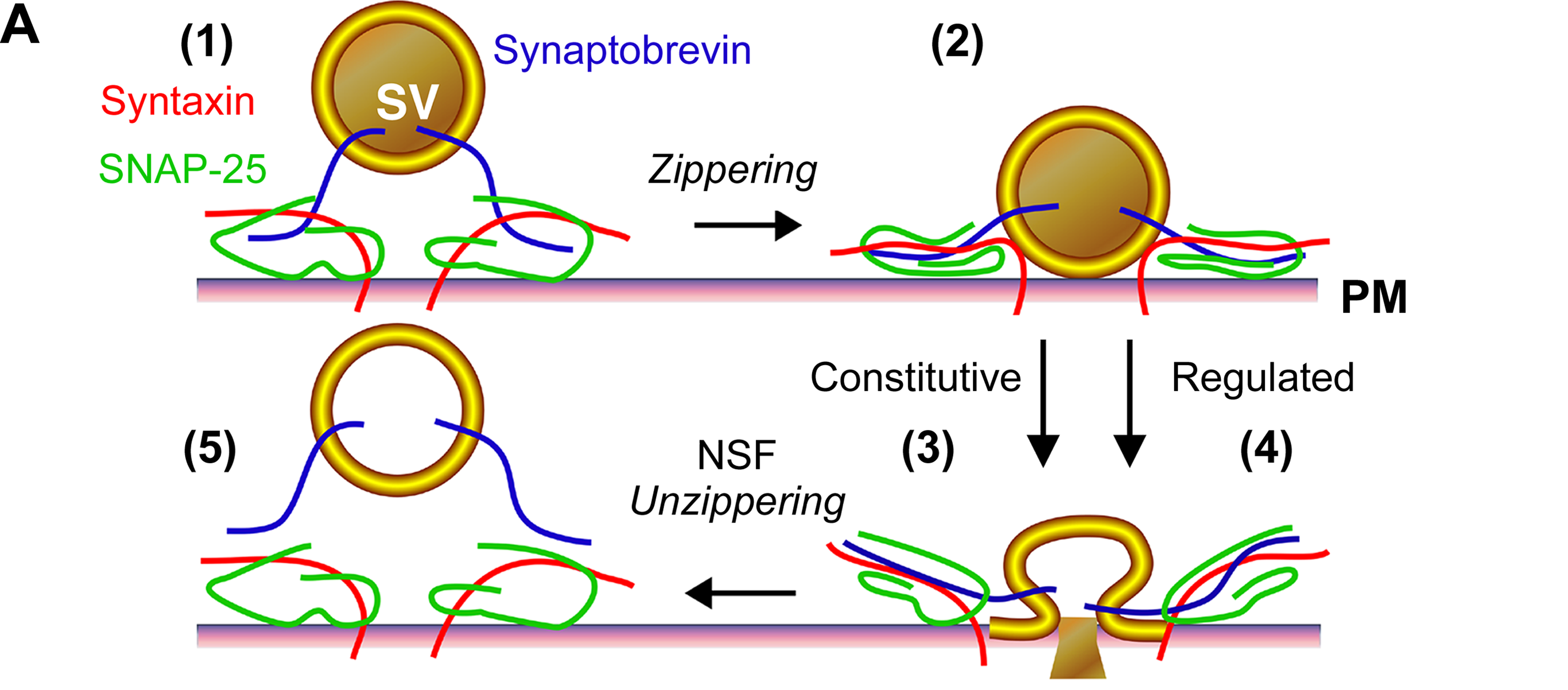
Calcium release causes a strong attraction between multiple proteins including synaptobrevin and SNARE proteins to pull the neurotransmitter vesicle to the membrane and release its contents into the synaptic cleft

Neurotransmitters are initially stored and synthesized in vesicles at the synapse of a neuron. When an action potential occurs in a cell, the electrical signal reaches the presynaptic terminal and the depolarization causes calcium channels to open, releasing calcium to travel down its electrochemical gradient. This influx of calcium subsequently is what causes the neurotransmitter vesicles to fuse with the presynaptic membrane. The calcium ions initiate the interaction of obligatory cofactor proteins with SNARE proteins to form a SNARE complex. These SNARE complexes mediate vesicle fusion by pulling the membranes together, leaking the neurotransmitters into the synaptic cleft. The neurotransmitter molecules can then signal the next cell via receptors on the post synaptic membrane. These receptors can either act as ion channels or GPCR (G-Protein Coupled Receptors). In general the neurotransmitter can either cause an excitatory or inhibitory response, depending on what occurs at the receptor.

==== Cl^{−} Channels ====
Chloride channels are another group of voltage gated ion channels, of which are less understood. They are involved with processes such as skeletal and cardiac smooth muscle, cell volume regulation, the cell cycle, and apoptosis. One major family of chloride proteins are called CLC proteins, functionally categories into channel or transporter. They share homodimeric structure with independent ion permeation pathway in each of the subunit. Based on functional characterization, there are two known gating mechanism: protopore and common gating. The protopore gating, also known as fast gating, is associated with occlusion of the pore via side-chain of conserved glutamate. While the common gating, also known as the slow gating, inactivated or reactivates both pores through unknown mechanism. This family either transports two chloride for one proton or simply allows flux down its electrochemical gradient. With this channel the correct depolarization and repolarization via chloride ions is essential for propagation of an action potential.

=== Ligand-gated ion channels ===
Ligand-gated ion channels are found on postsynaptic neurons. By default, they assume their closed conformation. When the presynaptic neuron releases neurotransmitters at the end of an action potential, they bind to ligand-gated ion channels. This causes the channels to assume their open conformation, allowing ions to flow through the channels down their concentration gradient. Ligand-gated ion channels are responsible for fast synaptic transmission in the nervous system and at the neuromuscular junction. Each ligand-gated ion channel has a wide range of receptors with differing biophysical properties as well as patterns of expression in the nervous system.

== Inactivation ==
Inactivation is when the flow of ions is blocked by a mechanism other than the closing of the channel. A channel in its open state may stop allowing ions to flow through, or a channel in its closed state may be preemptively inactivated to prevent the flow of ions. Inactivation typically occurs when the cell membrane depolarize, and ends when the resting potential is restored.

In sodium channels, inactivation appears to be the result of the actions of helices III-VI, with III and IV acting as a sort of hinged lid that block the channel. The exact mechanism is poorly understood, but seems to rely on a particle that has a high affinity for the exposed inside of the open channel. Rapid inactivation allows the channel to halt the flow of sodium very shortly after assuming its open conformation.

=== Ball and chain inactivation ===
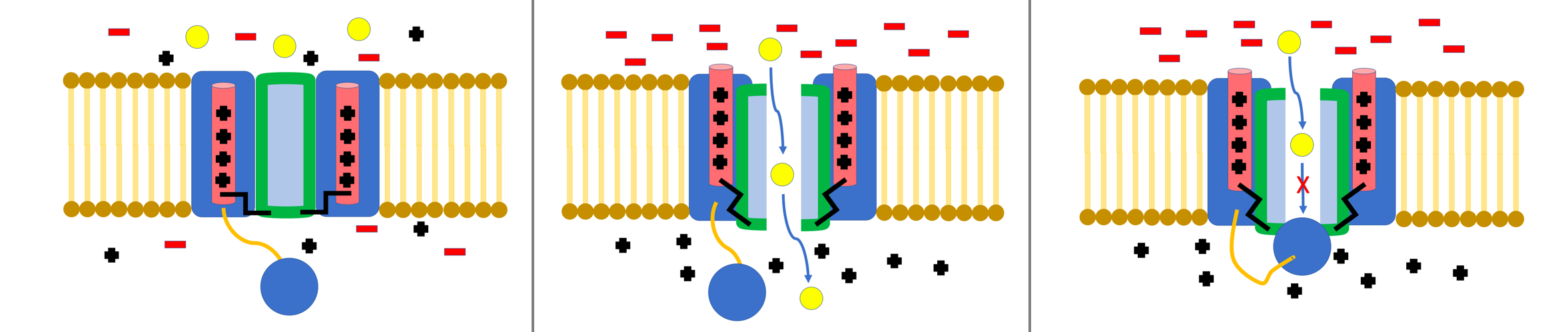
Voltage-gated ion channel in its closed, open, and inactivated states. The inactivated channel is still in its open state, but the ball domain blocks ion permeation.

The ball and chain model, also known as N-type inactivation or hinged lid inactivation, is a gating mechanism for some voltage-gated ion channels. Voltage-gated ion channels are composed of 4 α subunits, one or more of which will have a ball domain located on its cytoplasmic N-terminus. The ball domain is electrostatically attracted to the inner channel domain. When the ion channel is activated, the inner channel domain is exposed, and within milliseconds the chain will fold and the ball will enter the channel, occluding ion permeation. The channel returns to its closed state, blocking the channel domain, and the ball leaves the pore.

== Deactivation ==
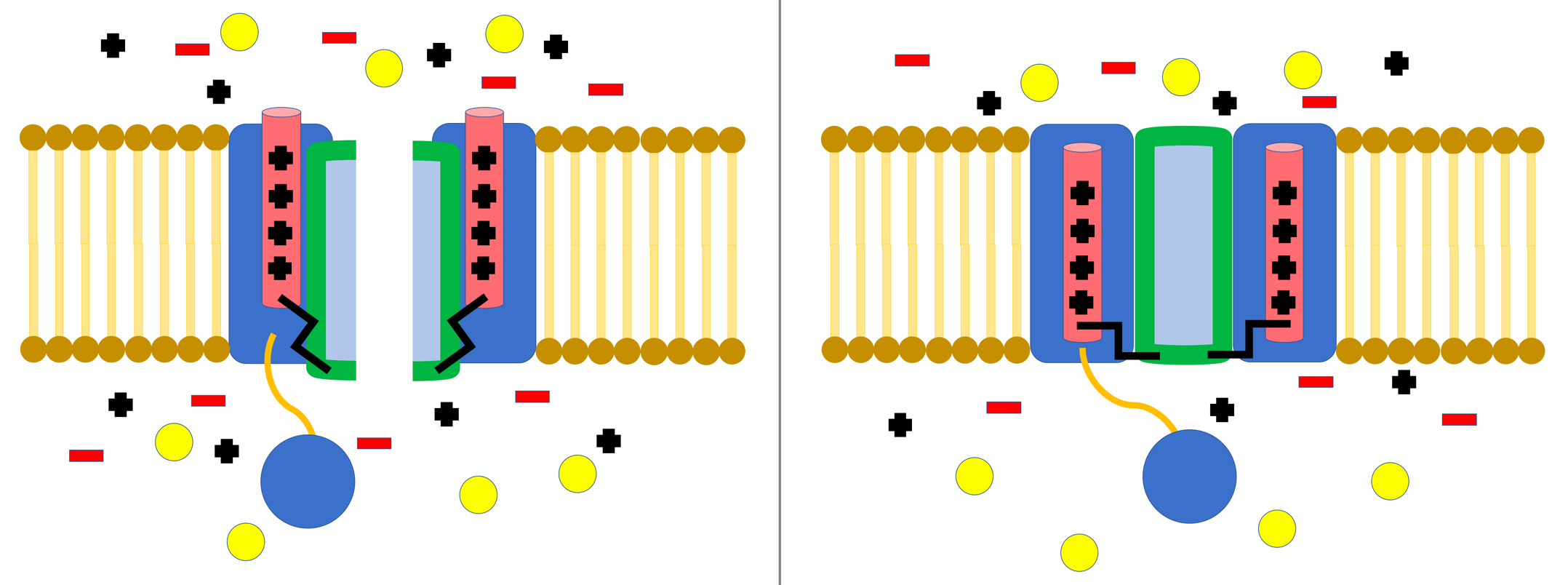
As the membrane potential returns to its resting value, the voltage differential is not sufficient to keep the channel in its open state, causing the channel to close.

Deactivation is the return of an ion channel to its closed conformation. For voltage-gated channels this occurs when the voltage differential that originally caused the channel to open returns to its resting value.

In voltage-gated sodium channels, deactivation is necessary to recover from inactivation.

In voltage gated potassium channels, the reverse is true, and deactivation slows the channel's recovery from activation. The closed conformation is assumed by default, and involves the partial straightening of helix VI by the IV-V linker. The mechanisms that cause opening and closing are not fully understood. The closed conformation appears to be a higher energy conformation than the open conformation, which may also help explain how the ion channel activates.

== Quantification ==
Gating charge can be calculated by solving Poisson's equation. Recent studies have suggested a molecular dynamics simulation-based method to determine gating charge by measuring electrical capacitor properties of membrane-embedded proteins. Activity of ion channels located in the plasma membrane can be measured by simply attaching a glass capillary electrode continuously with the membrane. Other ion channels located in the membranes of mitochondria, lysosomes, and the Golgi apparatus can be measured by an emergent technique that involves the use of an artificial bilayer lipid membrane attached to a 16 electrode device that measures electrical activity.

== See also ==
- Synaptic gating
- Synaptic potentials
