= J. Gabriel Gates =

American author, screenwriter, and actor

- Born: Michigan
- Occupations: Writer, novelist
- Writing career
- Genre: Science fiction
- Website: jgabrielgates.net

J. Gabriel Gates is an American author, screenwriter, and actor. Gates grew up in Michigan and attended Florida State University, where he graduated with a degree in theater. He began writing with fellow author Charlene Keel after putting out an ad on Craigslist for a mentor. The two co-created the young adult series The Tracks with the intent of turning it into a television series, later re-planning it as a series of novels.

== Bibliography ==
- The Sleepwalkers (2011)
- Blood Zero Sky (2012)

=== The Tracks ===
1. Dark Territory (2011)
2. Ghost Crown (2011)
