= Gate, Arkansas =

Coordinates: 34.715°N 94.168°W

Gate is an extinct town in Scott County, in the U.S. state of Arkansas.

== History ==
A post office called Gate was established in 1888, and remained in operation until 1921. The community was named for the toll gate which operated at the town site.
