= Davis Airport (Oregon) =

- IATA: none; ICAO: none; FAA LID: 6S4

Summary
- Airport type: Public use
- Owner: Davis Airport, Inc.
- Serves: Gates, Oregon
- Elevation AMSL: 1,028 ft (313 m)
- Coordinates: 44°44′45″N 122°25′17″W

Map
- Location of airport in Oregon

Runways
Direction	Length		Surface
Direction	ft	m	Surface
7/25	1,940	591	Turf

Statistics (2009)
- Aircraft operations: 1,000
- Based aircraft: 5
- Source: Federal Aviation Administration

Davis Airport (FAA LID: 6S4) is a privately owned, public use airport in Linn County, Oregon, United States. It is located one nautical mile (2 km) south of the central business district of Gates, Oregon, a city in Marion County and Linn County.

== Facilities and aircraft ==
Davis Airport covers an area of 10 acres (4 ha) at an elevation of 1,028 feet (313 m) above mean sea level. It has one runway designated 7/25 with a turf surface measuring 1,940 by 50 feet (591 x 15 m).

For the 12-month period ending May 27, 2009, the airport had 1,000 aircraft operations, an average of 83 per month: 90% general aviation and 10% air taxi. At that time there were 5 aircraft based at this airport: 80% single-engine and 20% multi-engine.
