= GATE (video game) =

1991 video game

Gate
- Apple IIGS version
- Developer: Bright Software
- Publishers: Toolbox (France), Seven Hills Software (USA)
- Designers: Henrik Gudat; Jörg Kienzle; Valérie Le Tensorer; Yann Le Tensorer
- Platforms: Apple IIGS, Macintosh
- Release: 1991, 1994
- Genre: Action-adventure
- Mode: Single-player

GATE is an action-adventure video game designed by Swiss programmers Henrik Gudat, Jörg Kienzle, and Yann Le Tensorer. The gameplay is comparable to Nintendo's The Legend of Zelda with a top-down view and a mixture of action, adventure, and puzzle solving.

The game was released for the Apple IIGS and the Macintosh. The Apple IIGS port supported multiple languages including English and French. Whilst the Macintosh variant could also support German or Kanji in addition to English and French from the original Apple IIGS port.

== Background ==
The game was programmed by Henrik Gudat when he was a college student. The starting point was a bet at school who could actually write a complete action game. After the basic functions were implemented, Jörg Kienzle and Yann Le Tensorer were both involved to provide graphics, sound effects and music. Yann Le Tensorer, who later became a key figure in the Rayman series of jump and run games from UbiSoft, provided most of the music and sound effects. Meanwhile, Jörg Kienzle designed graphical elements, developed the story line and contributed additional sound effects.

The game was initially published by Toolbox S.A. from Argenteuil. After Toolbox went out of business, the game's publishing and marketing was taken over by Seven Hills Software, Tallahassee FL.

== Technical Information ==
It was first released for the Apple IIGS in 1991, and requires at least 1MB of RAM. A stereo card is recommended since it implements 15 channel, stereo background music. Players are given the option at the beginning of the game to play in either English or French. The game is not hard drive installable since it uses a custom operating system; therefore a 3.5" disk drive is required to play.

GATE was ported to the Macintosh in 1994, by Jörg Kienzle with graphics designed by Valérie Le Tensorer. The game requires at least 4MB of RAM and runs on 68k or PowerPC Macs running an operating system between OS 6.0.7 and OS 9.2.2. Besides playing the game in either English or French, players can also choose German or Kanji in this version. It is hard drive installable and requires 4.5 MB of disk space. Although it was initially released by Seven Hills Software, Jörg Kienzle made it available as shareware in 1996.

== Plot ==
The player is a warrior who has been taken prisoner by Darg, the Firemaster, who is spreading terror on Divesia, the country where the game takes place. He has been thrown into the castle's prison. The goal of his mission is to find Darg and defeat him in a duel to restore peace to Divesia.

== Reception ==
GATE was highlighted as the Editor's Choice for December 1991, in the inCider/A+ magazine. The editors classify it as "exciting" and "addictive," adding that "the graphics images are colorful and quick; the music is bright and moves the action along."

The game was reviewed in the January/February 1995 issue of II Alive magazine by Larry L. Melton in the "Test Drives" column. The reviewer gave the game 3 out of 4 stars.
