= Frank Caleb Gates =

American botanist (1887–1955)

Frank Caleb Gates (September 12, 1887 – March 31, 1955) was an American botanist and plant ecologist. He was the president of the Ecological Society of America (ESA) in 1952.

== Biography ==
Gates was born in Chicago, graduating in 1910 with an A.B. from the University of Illinois and in 1912 with a Ph.D. from the University of Michigan, where he was strongly influenced by Henry A. Gleason. Gates's dissertation Winter as a factor in the xerophily of certain evergreen plants was supervised by Frederick Charles Newcombe. From 1912 to 1915 Gates was an instructor at the University of the Philippines. He went on a surveying expedition in the Philippines. In June 1915 he married Margaret "Madge" Murray Thompson (1887–1964). From 1916 to 1919 he was a professor at Carthage College. During WW I, he was in 1918 a 2nd lieutenant in the U.S. Army Sanitary Corps. At Kansas State Agricultural College (now named Kansas State University), Gates was from 1919 to 1922 an assistant professor, from 1922 to 1928 an associate professor, and from 1928 until his death in 1955 a full professor. From 1915 to 1954 he taught during the summers at the University of Michigan Biological Station (UMBS), located on the south shore of Douglas Lake in Cheboygan County, Michigan.

Gates was an expert on Michigan and Kansas vegetation. He conducted research on ecology, revegetation and succession, and particularly, how winter affects the xerophily of some evergreen species.

In 1921 he was elected a Fellow of the American Association for the Advancement of Science. In 1941 he was the president of the Kansas Academy of Science.

Frank C. Gates and his wife were the parents of David Murray Gates (1921–2016) and Margaret E. Gates (1923–2013).

== Selected publications ==
- Gates, Frank C. (1914). "Winter as a factor in the xerophily of certain evergreen plants". Botanical Gazette. 57 (6): 445–489. doi:10.1086/331343. S2CID 84957324.
- —— (1915). "A Sphagnum Bog in the Tropics". Journal of Ecology. 3 (1): 24–30. Bibcode:1915JEcol...3...24G. doi:10.2307/2255294. JSTOR 2255294.
- —— (1916). "Xerofotic Movements in Leaves" (PDF). Botanical Gazette. 61 (5): 399–407. doi:10.1086/331795. S2CID 84572794.
- —— (1917). "The Relation between Evaporation and Plant Succession in a Given Area". American Journal of Botany. 4 (3): 161–178. doi:10.2307/2434969. JSTOR 2434969.
- —— (1917). "The Revegetation of Taal Volcano, Philippine Islands". The Plant World. 20 (7): 195–207. JSTOR 43477587.
- —— (1923). "Influence of Moonlight on Movements of Leguminous Leaflets". Ecology. 4 (1): 37–39. Bibcode:1923Ecol....4...37G. doi:10.2307/1929271. JSTOR 1929271.
- —— (1926). "Evaporation in Vegetation at Different Heights". American Journal of Botany. 13 (3): 167–178. doi:10.2307/2435459. JSTOR 2435459.
- —— (1926). "Plant Successions About Douglas Lake, Cheboygan County, Michigan". Botanical Gazette. 82 (2): 170–182. doi:10.1086/333646. S2CID 83969586.
- —— (1926). "Sand Flotation in Nature". Science. 64 (1668): 595–596. doi:10.1126/science.64.1668.595.b. PMID 17770710. p. 596
- —— (1928). "Nutation in Pinus Sylvestris". Botanical Gazette. 85 (4): 451–456. doi:10.1086/333856. S2CID 83476046.
- Laude, H. H.; —— (1929). "A Head of Sorghum with Greatly Proliferated Spikelets". Botanical Gazette. 88 (4): 447–450. doi:10.1086/334016. S2CID 83768923.
- —— (1929). "The Gargoyle as a Scientific Instrument". Science. 70 (1806): 148–149. Bibcode:1929Sci....70..148G. doi:10.1126/science.70.1806.148. PMID 17836677.
- —— (1930). "Aspen Association in Northern Lower Michigan". Botanical Gazette. 90 (3): 233–259. doi:10.1086/334099. S2CID 84772965.
- ——; Black, Robert L. (1931). "The Dragoyle as an Ecological Instrument". Ecology. 12 (2): 448–452. Bibcode:1931Ecol...12..448G. doi:10.2307/1931649. JSTOR 1931649. p. 149 (See atmometer.)
- —— (1936). "Kansas Botanical Notes, 1935". Transactions of the Kansas Academy of Science. 39: 85–87. doi:10.2307/3625148. JSTOR 3625148.
- —— (1939). "Trends of Tree Migration in Kansas". Transactions of the Kansas Academy of Science. 42: 127–132. JSTOR 3625062.
- —— (1940). "Bog Levels". Science. 91 (2367): 449–450. doi:10.1126/science.91.2367.449.b. PMID 17838918. S2CID 239858186. p. 450
- —— (1942). "The Bogs of Northern Lower Michigan". Ecological Monographs. 12 (3): 214–254. Bibcode:1942EcoM...12..213G. doi:10.2307/1943542. JSTOR 1943542.
- —— (1948). "Colonization of Certain Aquatic Plants on an Open Shoal". Ecology. 29 (2): 205–208. Bibcode:1948Ecol...29..205G. doi:10.2307/1932815. JSTOR 1932815.
- —— (1949). Field manual of plant ecology (1st ed.). McGraw-Hill. LCCN agr49000418. OCLC 1495218; 137 pages
- —— (1950). "The Disappearing Sleeping Bear Dune". Ecology. 31 (3): 386–392. Bibcode:1950Ecol...31..386G. doi:10.2307/1931493. JSTOR 1931493.
