= Gates, Oregon =

- City
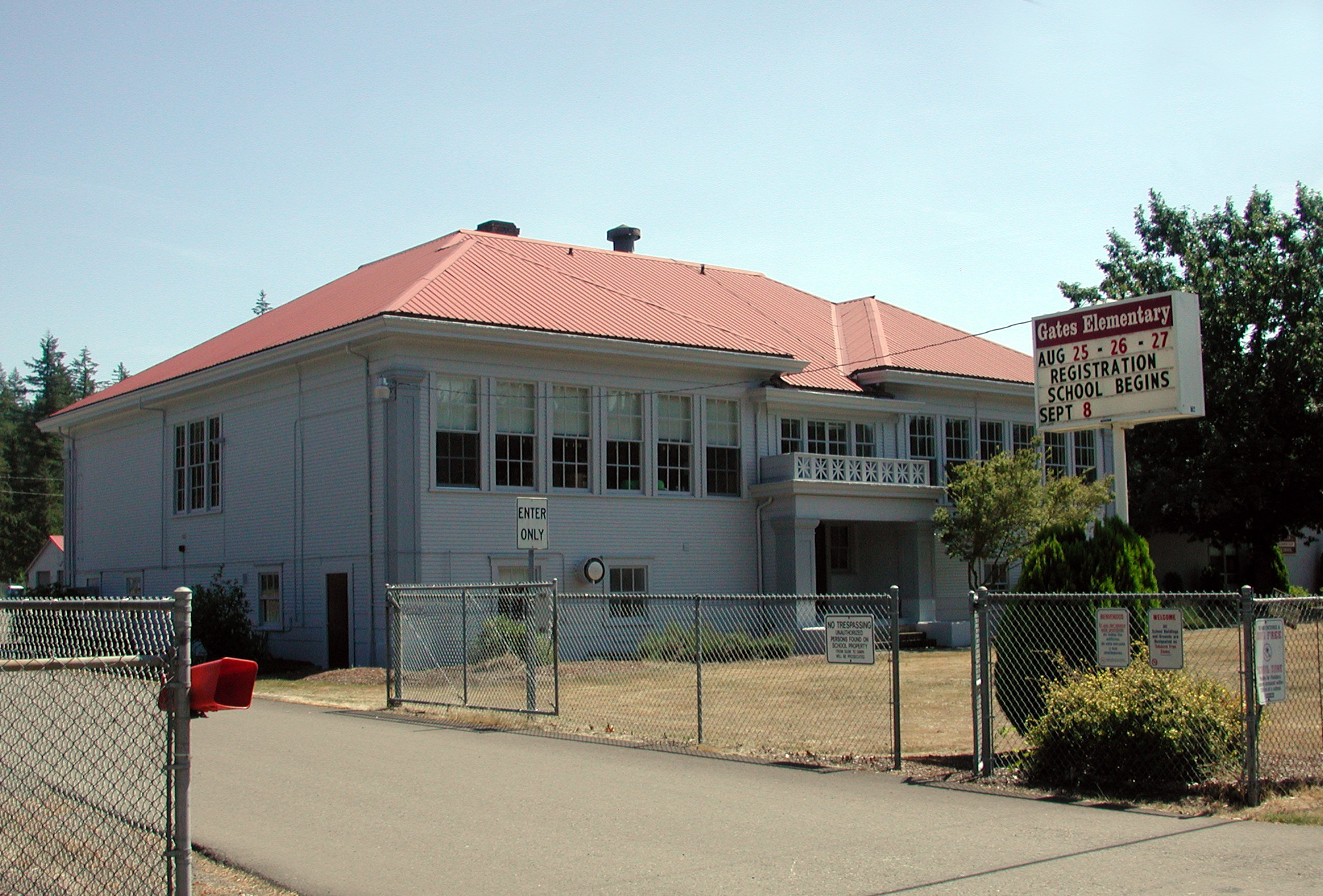
- Gates Elementary School in 2009

- Location in Oregon
- Coordinates: 44°45′22″N 122°25′12″W
- Country: United States
- State: Oregon
- Counties: Marion, Linn
- Incorporated: 1950

Government
  - Mayor (Acting): John McCormick (Council President)

Area
  - Total: 0.64 sq mi (1.67 km^{2})
  - Land: 0.64 sq mi (1.67 km^{2})
  - Water: 0 sq mi (0.00 km^{2})
- Elevation: 938 ft (286 m)

Population (2020)
  - Total: 548
  - Density: 849.1/sq mi (327.83/km^{2})
- Time zone: UTC-8 (Pacific)
  - Summer (DST): UTC-7 (Pacific)
- ZIP Code: 97346
- Area codes: 503 and 971
- FIPS code: 41-28200
- GNIS feature ID: 2410576
- Website: www.cityofgates.com

Gates is a city on the border of Linn and Marion counties in Oregon, United States. The population was 548 at the 2020 census. The greater part of Gates' population is in Marion County, and the city is primarily under Marion County's jurisdiction.

The Marion County portion of Gates is part of the Salem Metropolitan Statistical Area, while the Linn County portion is part of the Albany–Lebanon Micropolitan Statistical Area.

== History ==
Gates' first post office was established in 1882 on the south side of the North Santiam River as Henness, named for the first postmaster, Jane Henness. The post office later moved to the north side of the river as Gatesville, but the post office was established with the name Gates on February 12, 1892. The name honored one of the oldest settlers in the area, Mary Gates. The city was incorporated in 1950.

The town was the headquarters for controlling the Beachie Creek Fire, which started August 16, 2020, and at the time was estimated to be 469 acres (190 ha) in size. However, dry vegetation and a historic windstorm during the night of September 7 rapidly increased the fire to 131,000 acres (53,000 ha), threatening the town and forcing the firefighters to evacuate their encampment. Gates was extensively damaged by the wildfire.

== Geography ==
Gates is in southeastern Marion County, mainly on the north side of the North Santiam River. A neighborhood on the south side of the river at the east end of town is in Linn County. Oregon Route 22 passes through Gates, leading west 34 miles (55 km) to Salem, the state capital, and east up the North Santiam valley 17 miles (27 km) to Detroit.

According to the U.S. Census Bureau, Gates has a total area of 0.65 square miles (1.68 km^{2}), all land. The city is at the western edge of the Cascade Range.

=== Climate ===
This region experiences warm (but not hot) and dry summers, with no average monthly temperatures above 71.6 °F (22.0 °C). According to the Köppen Climate Classification system, Gates has a warm-summer Mediterranean climate, abbreviated "Csb" on climate maps.

== Demographics ==
Historical population
Census	Pop.	Note	%±
1960	189		—
1970	250		32.3%
1980	455		82.0%
1990	499		9.7%
2000	471		−5.6%
2010	471		0.0%
2020	548		16.3%
U.S. Decennial Census

=== 2020 census ===
As of the 2020 census, Gates had a population of 548. The median age was 51.2 years, with 18.8% of residents under the age of 18 and 28.8% aged 65 years or older. For every 100 females there were 116.6 males, and for every 100 females age 18 and over there were 123.6 males age 18 and over.

As of the 2020 census, 0% of residents lived in urban areas, while 100.0% lived in rural areas.

As of the 2020 census, there were 239 households in Gates, of which 26.8% had children under the age of 18 living in them. Of all households, 43.5% were married-couple households, 27.6% were households with a male householder and no spouse or partner present, and 23.4% were households with a female householder and no spouse or partner present. About 30.5% of all households were made up of individuals and 15.9% had someone living alone who was 65 years of age or older.

As of the 2020 census, there were 263 housing units, of which 9.1% were vacant. Among occupied housing units, 71.1% were owner-occupied and 28.9% were renter-occupied. The homeowner vacancy rate was 1.1% and the rental vacancy rate was 11.5%.

Racial composition as of the 2020 census
Race	Number	Percent
White	468	85.4%
Black or African American	3	0.5%
American Indian and Alaska Native	9	1.6%
Asian	4	0.7%
Native Hawaiian and Other Pacific Islander	0	0%
Some other race	20	3.6%
Two or more races	44	8.0%
Hispanic or Latino (of any race)	24	4.4%

=== 2010 census ===
As of the census of 2010, there were 471 people, 222 households, and 129 families living in the city. The population density was 724.6 inhabitants per square mile (279.8/km^{2}). There were 249 housing units at an average density of 383.1 per square mile (147.9/km^{2}). The racial makeup of the city was 92.4% White, 0.2% African American, 1.7% Native American, 0.8% Asian, 0.4% from other races, and 4.5% from two or more races. Hispanic or Latino of any race were 4.5% of the population.

There were 222 households, of which 22.1% had children under the age of 18 living with them, 44.6% were married couples living together, 5.9% had a female householder with no husband present, 7.7% had a male householder with no wife present, and 41.9% were non-families. 36.9% of all households were made up of individuals, and 12.7% had someone living alone who was 65 years of age or older. The average household size was 2.12 and the average family size was 2.70.

The median age in the city was 47.9 years. 19.1% of residents were under the age of 18; 5.2% were between the ages of 18 and 24; 21.2% were from 25 to 44; 32.4% were from 45 to 64; and 21.9% were 65 years of age or older. The gender makeup of the city was 53.9% male and 46.1% female.

=== 2000 census ===
As of the census of 2000, there were 471 people, 208 households, and 136 families living in the city. The population density was 773.5 inhabitants per square mile (298.7/km^{2}). There were 261 housing units at an average density of 428.7 per square mile (165.5/km^{2}). The racial makeup of the city was 87.47% White, 2.97% Native American, 0.21% Asian, 4.03% from other races, and 5.31% from two or more races. Hispanic or Latino of any race were 6.37% of the population.

There were 208 households, out of which 21.6% had children under the age of 18 living with them, 55.3% were married couples living together, 4.8% had a female householder with no husband present, and 34.6% were non-families. 29.3% of all households were made up of individuals, and 15.4% had someone living alone who was 65 years of age or older. The average household size was 2.26 and the average family size was 2.79.

In the city, the population was spread out, with 20.2% under the age of 18, 5.7% from 18 to 24, 22.1% from 25 to 44, 31.2% from 45 to 64, and 20.8% who were 65 years of age or older. The median age was 47 years. For every 100 females, there were 104.8 males. For every 100 females age 18 and over, there were 102.2 males.

The median income for a household in the city was $32,344, and the median income for a family was $37,143. Males had a median income of $35,714 versus $31,250 for females. The per capita income for the city was $17,065. About 15.9% of families and 17.9% of the population were below the poverty line, including 23.1% of those under age 18 and 11.0% of those age 65 or over.

== Education ==
Gates is served by the Santiam Canyon School District. Area students attend Santiam Elementary Schools, Mill City Middle School, and Santiam High School in Mill City. The former elementary school in Gates closed in 2012 and in 2014 was sold to Upward Bound Camp for Persons with Special Needs, Inc. Upward Bound Camp has opened a year-round camp facility there for adults with special needs.

== Transportation ==
- Davis Airport, a public use airport located 1 mile south of Gates is a big open pasture for small aircraft. Uncontrolled.
- Bus, Cherriots; Bus Route 30X Service between Salem and Gates
