= Gate (surname) =

Gate or Gaté is a surname. Notable individuals with this surname include:

- Aaron Gate (born 1990), New Zealand Olympic cyclist
- Denis Gaté (born 1958), French Olympic rower
- Gabriel Gaté (born 1955), French chef living in Australia
- Simon Gate (1883–1945), Swedish painter, graphic designer, glass artist, and book illustrator and portraitist

== See also ==
- Gates (surname)
