= Gaetz =

Gaetz is a surname. Notable people with the surname include:

- Gaetz political family
  - Jerry Gaetz (1914–1964), American politician, member of the North Dakota Senate
  - Don Gaetz (born 1948), American politician, member of the Florida Senate; son of Jerry Gaetz
  - Matt Gaetz (born 1982), American politician (U.S. House of Representatives from Florida 2017–2024); son of Don Gaetz
- John Gaetz (1857–1937), Canadian politician
- Leonard Gaetz (1841–1907), Canadian politician
- Link Gaetz (born 1968), Canadian-Finnish ice hockey player
- Nelson Gaetz (1907–1988), Canadian politician
- Sharon Gaetz (21st century), Canadian politician
- Stephen Gaetz, Canadian professor
