= Synaptic gating =

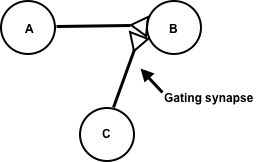
An axo-axonal gated synapse: Neuron C gates the synapse between Neuron A and B.

Synaptic gating is the ability of neural circuits to gate inputs by either suppressing or facilitating specific synaptic activity. Selective inhibition of certain synapses has been studied thoroughly (see Gate theory of pain), and recent studies have supported the existence of permissively gated synaptic transmission. In general, synaptic gating involves a mechanism of central control over neuronal output. It includes a sort of gatekeeper neuron, which has the ability to influence transmission of information to selected targets independently of the parts of the synapse upon which it exerts its action (see also neuromodulation).

Bistable neurons have the ability to oscillate between a hyperpolarized (down state) and a depolarized (up state) resting membrane potential without firing an action potential. These neurons can thus be referred to as up/down neurons. According to one model, this ability is linked to the presence of NMDA and AMPA glutamate receptors. External stimulation of the NMDA receptors is responsible for moving the neuron from the down state to the up state, while the stimulation of AMPA receptors allows the neuron to reach and surpass the threshold potential. Neurons that have this bistable ability have the potential to be gated because outside gatekeeper neurons can modulate the membrane potential of the gated neuron by selectively shifting them from the up state to the down state. Such mechanisms have been observed in the nucleus accumbens, with gatekeepers originating in the cortex, thalamus and basal ganglia.

== Gated synapse model ==
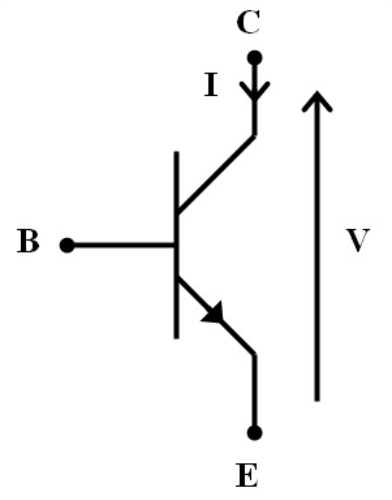
An example of a Bipolar junction transistor which can be used as a model for synaptic gating. B would represent the gatekeeper neuron that regulates the transmission of the signal from C to E.

The model for gated synapses was originally derived from the model electronic circuit, in which the gatekeeper serves as a transistor in a circuit. In a circuit, a transistor can act as a switch that turns an electrical signal on or off. In addition, a transistor can serve to amplify an existing current in a circuit. In effect, the gatekeeper neuron acts as the transistor of a gated synapse by modulating the transmission of the signal between the pre-synaptic and post-synaptic neurons.

In a model gated synapse, the gate is either open or closed by default. The gatekeeper neuron, therefore, serves as an external switch to the gate at the synapse of two other neurons. One of these neurons provides the input signal and the other provides the output signal. It is the role of the gatekeeper neuron to regulate the transmission of the input to the output. When activated, the gatekeeper neuron alters the polarity of the presynaptic axon to either open or close the gate. If this neuron depolarizes the presynaptic axon, it allows the signal to be transmitted. Thus, the gate is open. Hyperpolarization of the presynaptic axon closes the gate. Just like in a transistor, the gatekeeper neuron turns the system on or off; it affects the output signal of the postsynaptic neuron. Whether it is turned on or off is dependent on the nature of the input signal (either excitatory or inhibitory) from the presynaptic neuron.

== Inhibition ==
=== Modulation of interneurons ===
Gating can occur by shunting inhibition in which inhibitory interneurons change the membrane conductance of an excitatory target axon, thereby diffusing its excitatory signal. A gating signal from the gatekeeper triggers these inhibitory interneurons in order to prevent one set of neurons from firing even when stimulated by another set. In this state, the gate is closed. Examples of this kind of gating have been found in visual cortical neurons and areas of the prefrontal cortex (PFC) in primates that may be responsible for suppressing irrelevant stimuli. Studies suggest that this kind of inhibition can be attributed in part to GABA receptor-mediated synapses.

In order for these inhibitory interneurons to act upon their targets, they must receive input from a gatekeeper signal that stimulates them. This input can be either intrinsic, extrinsic or both. Extrinsic input comes from an area of the brain anatomically and functionally distinct from a given circuit, while intrinsic input is released from parts if the circuit itself. Generally, this input occurs in the form of neuromodulatory substances, such as hormones, neuropeptides and other neurotransmitters that have been released from incoming neurons. These signals then converge on the gatekeeper, where they are integrated and directed toward the target. Depending on the circuit, gate signals may arrive from different brain areas. For example, studies have shown that the entorhinal cortex may gate areas of the medial PFC, thereby inhibiting them from projecting to other brain areas.

Additional research has shown that the thalamus can also act as a source for gating signals. In the pathway between the PFC and the hippocampus, stimulation of mediodorsal thalamic neurons, as well as stimulation of ventral tegmental area neurons inhibited PFC neuron firing. These inhibitory effects were shown to be modulated by various dopamine receptor antagonists, which implies some role of dopamine as a neuromodulatory agent in this circuit.

=== Role in spatial attention ===
Due to the brain's limited capacity to process information, it becomes necessary that the brain have the ability filter out unnecessary information, and select important information. Input, especially to the visual field, competes for selective attention. Models for gating mechanisms in the process of attention have been explored by many groups of researchers, however, a consensus on the role of synaptic gating in attention has not been reached.

=== Role in working memory ===
Gating mechanisms in the basal ganglia have been linked to our ability to filter irrelevant information and access relevant information from working memory. In this instance, the gatekeeping function is the responsibility of the thalamus. It opens the gate between two areas in the cortex, allowing for the influence of stimuli in working memory. The thalamus, however, is tonically inhibited by the basal ganglia. Activation within the basal ganglia will allow for the disinhibition of the thalamus and thus, the opening of the gate.

== Permissive gating ==
The firing of an action potential, and consequently the release of neurotransmitters, occurs by this gating mechanism. In synaptic gating, in order for an action potential to occur, there must be more than one input to produce a single output in the neuron being gated. The interaction between these sets of neurons creates a biological AND gate. The neuron being gated is bistable and must be brought to the up state before it can fire an action potential. When this bistable neuron is in the up state, the gate is open. A gatekeeper neuron is responsible for stimulating the bistable neuron by shifting it from a down state to an up state and thus, opening the gate. Once the gate is open, an excitatory neuron can cause the bistable neuron to further depolarize and reach threshold causing and action potential to occur. If the gatekeeper does not shift the bistable neuron from down to up, the excitatory neuron will not be able to fire an action potential in the bistable neuron. Both the gatekeeper neuron and excitatory neuron are necessary to fire an action potential in the bistable neuron, but neither is sufficient to do so alone.

An example of this type of gating may occur in the nucleus accumbens. Studies have shown hippocampal neurons may gate the transmission of signals between the prefrontal cortex and the nucleus accumbens. Stimulation of the prefrontal cortical neurons has a very small chance of eliciting an action potential in the nucleus accumbens while those neurons are in the down state. Likewise, stimulation of hippocampal neurons fails to produce action potentials in the nucleus accumbens; however, these hippocampal neurons have been shown to switch their targets in the nucleus accumbens to the up state. As long as these neurons remain in the up state, stimulation of prefrontal cortical neurons has a much higher likelihood of producing action potentials in the nucleus accumbens. Thus, the hippocampus serves as the gatekeeper for information flow from the prefrontal cortex to the nucleus accumbens, such that its action permissively gates these synapses.

Synaptic gating involves a variety of mechanisms by which the efficacy of neuronal activity is modulated. Additional studies demonstrate the permissive properties of synaptic gating. In certain instances, membrane depolarization will cause an opening of the gates that previously had an inhibitory effect on the neuron they were gating. This permissive gating is more than a matter of simple summation, however. Summation is the convergence of many EPSPs at the axon hillock (either from a single neuron firing at a high frequency or from many neurons firing at once) that depolarizes the membrane potential to the point of threshold. The membrane depolarization caused by the opening of synaptic gates causes an additional increase in intracellular calcium that facilitates the release of neurotransmitters; thus, it is able to selectively distribute information from the presynaptic cell.

== Disease ==
=== Comorbidity of ADHD and anxiety ===
Studies of children diagnosed with ADHD have shown considerably higher scores on the Anxious/Depressed scale of the Achenbach Child Behavior Checklist, which implies a comorbidity of ADHD and anxiety. It has been suggested that impaired synaptic gating processes in the nucleus accumbens are the underlying cause of this comorbidity. This defect causes a reduction in synaptic gating of dopamine input from the prefrontal cortex and hippocampus on the nucleus accumbens. One theory supposes that this defect reduces the individual's ability to selectively inhibit fear responses from the amygdala, leading to anxiety. There are several theories, however, on how this impairment ultimately affects those with ADHD.

In studies with rodents, the prefrontal cortex, specifically the medial prefrontal cortex (mPFC) has been implicated in the processing of information lasting from milliseconds to several seconds, while the hippocampus has been implicated in the processing of information for longer time scales – such as minutes to hours. Damage to both these areas in people with ADHD seems to illustrate why they exhibit inattentiveness and impulsiveness. Nucleus accumbens neurons are bistable and thus can be selectively gated to either an "up" – depolarized state or a "down" – hyperpolarized state. Nucleus accumbens neurons are gated by hippocampal and amygdala input and this creates a depolarized accumbens neuron that is more receptive to innervation from input from the prefrontal cortex. Thus, in patients with ADHD not only is the input from the prefrontal cortex to the nucleus accumbens reduced but in addition the gating input from the hippocampus to the nucleus accumbens is also reduced leading to a reduction in activation of the nucleus accumbens neurons. Individuals that take medication such as methylphenidate (Ritalin) will increase their dopamine (DA) output along many of these synapses helping to compensate in the loss of synaptic activity generated from the pathophysiology of ADHD. Taking methylphenidate can increase DA projections to the nucleus accumbens, which can not only act to increase synaptic activity between the prefrontal cortex and hippocampus (improving memory) but also act as a reward system as the nucleus accumbens is part of the mesolimbic pathway. Moreover, it is possibly why individuals on Ritalin have a “need” and “desire” to learn as it acts as a positive reinforcer in the brain. In addition, this reward circuitry activation is most likely a reason why methylphenidate is highly addictive and carries great dependence. In conclusion, synaptic gating illustrates a plausible mechanism by which ADHD medication like Ritalin modulates synaptic activity and memory.

=== Schizophrenia ===
People who suffer from schizophrenia often exhibit an inability to illustrate context-dependent memory, an inability to show affective valence – proper emotions, and an inability for attentional and temporal processes. Synaptic gating seems to illustrate why all of these inabilities develop. In particular, hippocampal input into the nucleus accumbens, a region of the basal ganglia, acts as a gate creating a more depolarized up state within the accumbens neurons allowing them to be more receptive to innervation from the prefrontal cortex (PFC). In addition, amygdala input, in much the same way, acts as a gate creating a more depolarized state within the accumbens neurons although this depolarized state is much more transient. All in all, nucleus accumbens neurons are bistable. People with schizophrenia have damage to the hippocampus and amygdala illustrating improper gating and resulting in nucleus accumbens neurons being in the down position. This is why people with schizophrenia display an inability for context-dependent memory and their inability to show proper affective valence. In addition, because accumbens neurons are in the down position they are not as receptive to PFC stimulation and therefore people with schizophrenia show problems with attentional deficits. The gating theory of schizophrenia posits a bistable nucleus accumbens neuron that when gated improperly leads to a wealth of behavioral and memory deficits.

== Current and future research ==
Current research now has shed light on the fact that the bistability of a neuron may be part of a larger bistable neural network. Evidence of a bistable network has been shown with the interneurons of the auditory cortex. The stable states of this auditory cortex network are either synchronous or antisynchronous, which illustrates its bistable nature. When auditory interneurons were coupled with electrical and chemical inhibitory synapses, a bimodal firing pattern was observed. This bimodal pattern illustrates the bistability of the network to fire at either a synchronous or antisynchronous state. These two states could be modes by which an individual perceives different frequencies in sound waves. Future research is looking into whether this bistable network embodies many of the properties of a bistable neuron, and if there is a larger gatekeeper modulating the network as a whole.

It has been shown that nucleus accumbens neurons are capable of being gated because they are bistable. Recent evidence has shown that neurons in the cortex are also bistable, and thus also able to be gated. There appear to be three different types of gating circuits – one that is controlled by the cortex, one that is controlled by the association nuclei in the thalamus, and one that is controlled by circuits spanning the basal ganglia, cortex, and the thalamus. Strong evidence has concluded that gating from thalamus impacts the prefrontal cortex response from the hippocampus. This is seen as either an enhancement or a suppression illustrating the bistability of the process. It has been proven that nucleus accumbens neurons act as a gate yet do the neurons in the cortex act in the same manner? Future research will look at similarities between the two sets of bistable neurons. In addition, the mechanism of shifting the bistable neurons to their “down” state needs to be expanded upon. This state leads to inhibition and thus are their inhibitory interneurons that modulate this shift and if so are inhibitory neurotransmitters such as GABA involved? Lastly, neurons capable of modulating gates such as hippocampal and thalamic neurons can contact many different areas of the brain. With increasing research saying that neurons in the cortex, nucleus accumbens, and cerebellum are all able to be gated, can the hippocampus modulate the signals for all of these and if so can it connect these different brain areas into a much larger neural network capable of being modulated all at once? These are the questions at the heart of synaptic gating in the future.
