= The Gates (2022 film) =

- Directed by: Stephen Hall
- Written by: Stephen Hall; Tim Reynolds
- Produced by: Michael Jones; John Lerchen; Paul Thompstone
- Starring: John Rhys-Davies; Richard Brake; Elena Delia; Michael Yare; David Pearse
- Cinematography: Burschi Wojnar
- Edited by: John Cutler
- Music by: Max Davidoff-Grey; Jason Lazarus
- Production companies: Forever Safe Productions; Mad Honey Productions; Studio Atlantic
- Distributed by: 101 Films
- Release dates: 18 November 2022 (Cork International Film Festival); 27 June 2023 (Internet)
- Running time: 112 minutes
- Country: Ireland
- Language: English

The Gates is a 2022 Irish period horror thriller film directed by Stephen Hall. Written by Hall and Tim Reynolds, it stars John Rhys-Davies, Richard Brake, Elena Delia, Michael Yare and David Pearse.

== Cast ==
- John Rhys-Davies as Frederick Ladbroke
- Richard Brake as William Colcott
- Elena Delia as Emma Wickes
- Michael Yare as Lucian Abberton
- David Pearse as Father Matthews
- Peter Coonan as George Sheppard
- Brian Fortune as Governor Owen Forsyth
- Tristan Heanue as Jonathan Chapman
- Matthew O'Brien as Phillip
- Claire Loy as Marie Sheppard
- Garrett Smith as Jonathan Waldren
- Sarah Noll as Selina Colcott
- Graeme Coughlan as Crimms
- Zeb Moore as Patrick
- Tom Neville as Mr. Leyton
- Lydia Little as Mrs. Leyton
- Christine Mulhern as Agnes
- Nigel Mercier as First Official

== Release ==
The film premiered at Cork International Film Festival on 18 November 2022. It was released to digital and VOD on 27 June 2023.

== Reception ==
Roger Crow of On: Yorkshire Magazine gave the film a score of 7.3/10, calling it an "earnest but engaging period offerings that successfully captivates audiences with its intriguing storyline and fine performances, particularly from Rhys-Davies." Film Ireland wrote: "While the plot may lack some of the finer details to help set it apart, the atmospheric film with some strong performances is well worth a watch. It may not send chills down the spine of the most avid horror fan, it will certainly offer up a few scares." Phil Hoad of The Guardian was more critical, giving the film 2 out of 5 stars. He wrote that while it was "strong on staging and atmosphere", it "finally collapses into incoherent scurrying around the jail".
