= Gates Pass =

Mountain pass in the Tucson Mountains, Arizona

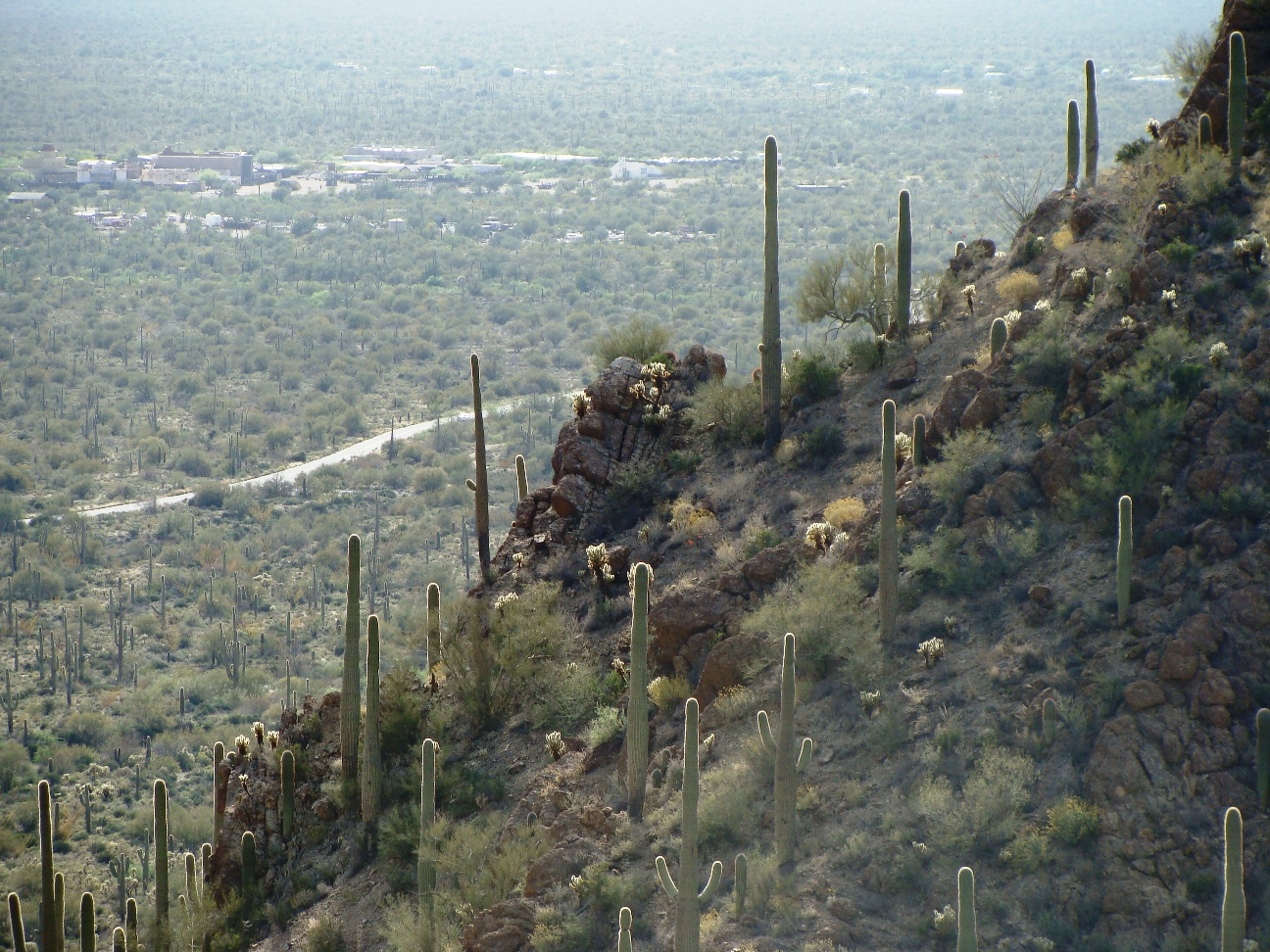
- Saguaro at Gates Pass

- Location within Arizona
- Elevation: 3,169 feet (966 m)
- Traversed by: Gates Pass Road

Third Approach
- Location: Arizona; United States
- Range: Tucson Mountains
- Coordinates: 32°13′20″N 111°06′03″W
- Topo map: USGS Cat Mountain

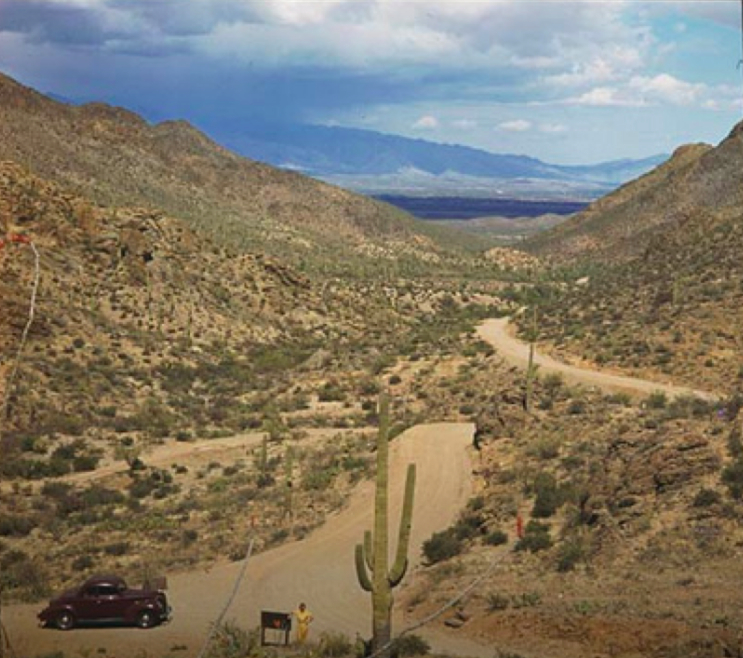
Looking down toward Tucson from Gates Pass, 1940. Car is a 1938 Ford.

Gates Pass is a mountain pass along the crest of the Tucson Mountains. The road through the pass is a scenic route west of Tucson, Arizona. The road from the east is West Anklam Road which merges with West Speedway Boulevard in the city just east of North Camino De Oeste. West of the pass the road is known as Saguaro Road and continues until it reaches Kinney Road just north of Old Tucson. The elevation of the pass is 3,172 feet (967 m).

The road is lined with scenic overlooks, and is an area where locals and tourists come to watch the sunset.

== History ==
The road through Gates Pass was started in 1883 by Thomas Gates, in a search for a shortcut through the Tucson Mountains; Gates was a local pioneer, and a saloon and ranch keeper. He purchased the land in order to build this road.

According to a December 2000 traffic study, the road carried approximately 3100 cars daily.

Gates Pass was featured in David Leighton's popular series, "Street Smarts," in the Arizona Daily Star on Jan. 1, 2013.

== Safety ==
Gates Pass has been considered an extremely dangerous road due to a slope that occurs midway through the route, with 58 wrecks reported between 1996 and 2001. In late 2005, a project was undertaken to improve the safety of the road, which included widening and a temporary closure. This project was named the third best road project in the country for the year 2006 in Roads and Bridges Magazine.
