= Broward County, Florida =

County in Florida, United States

Broward County
- County
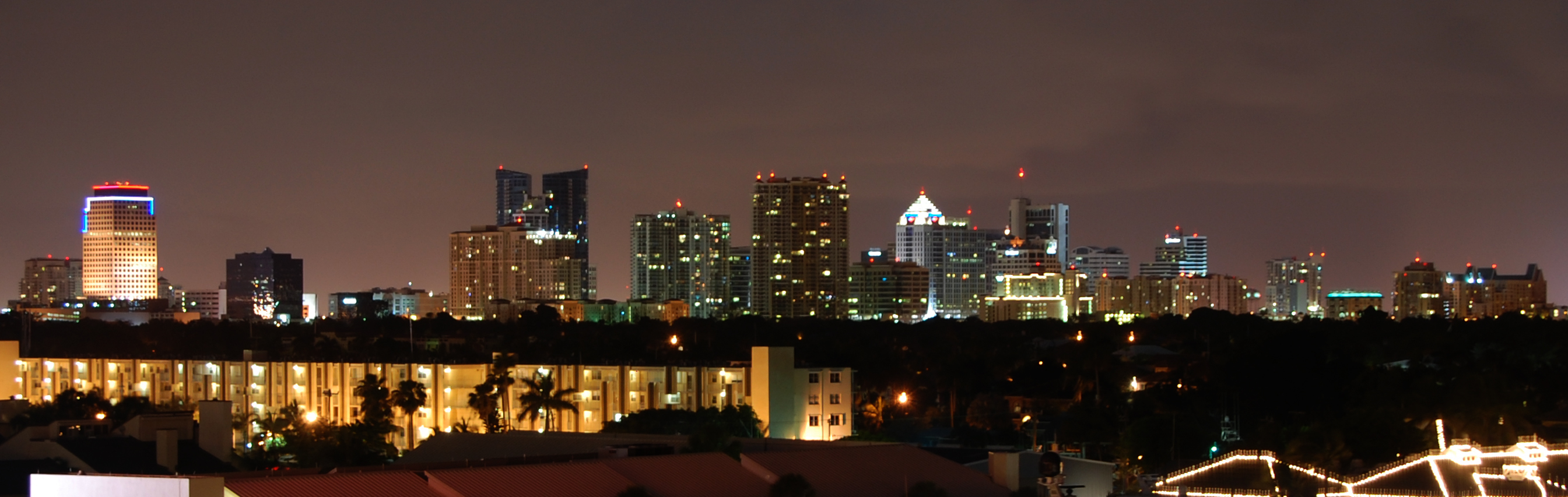
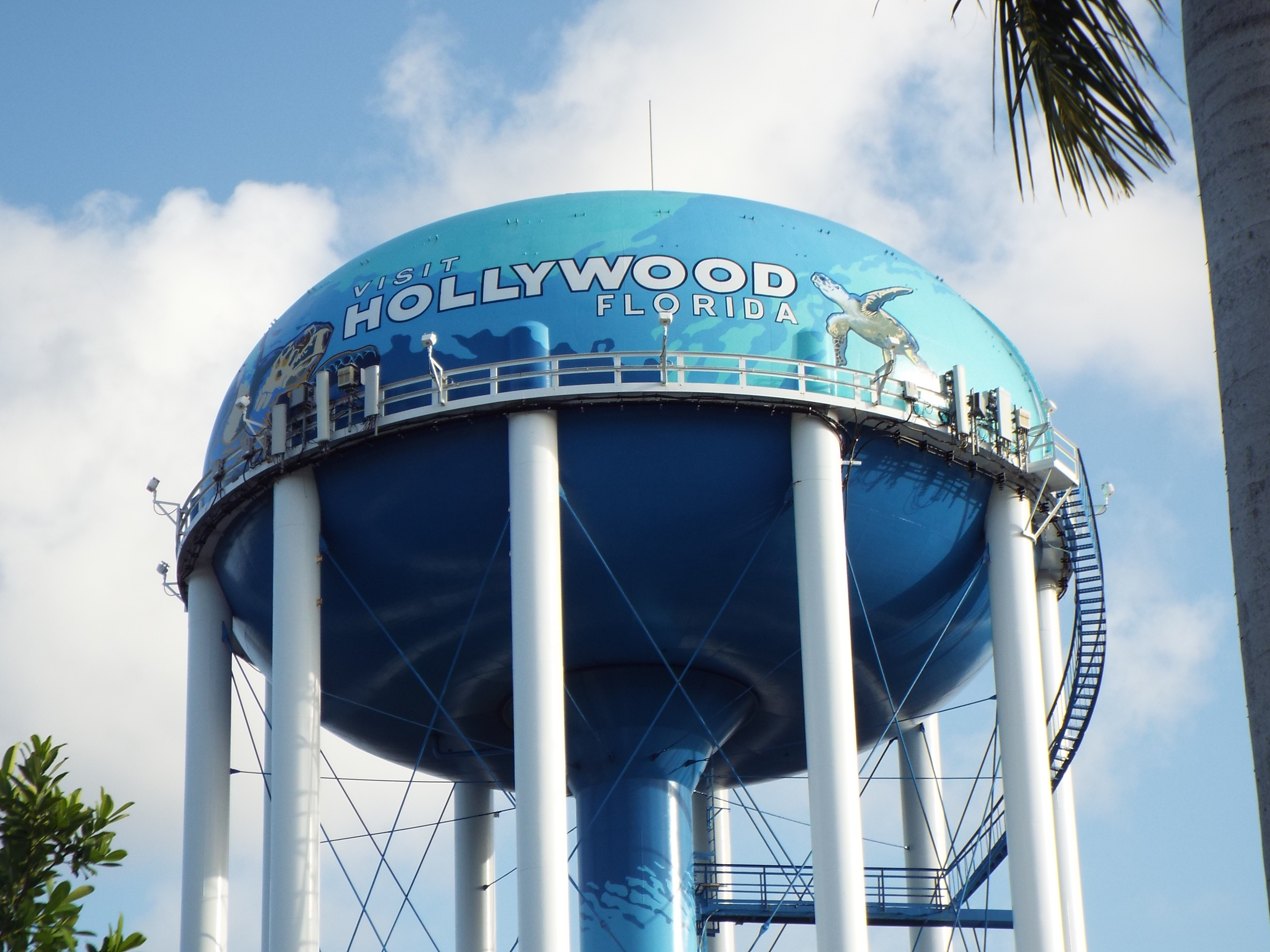
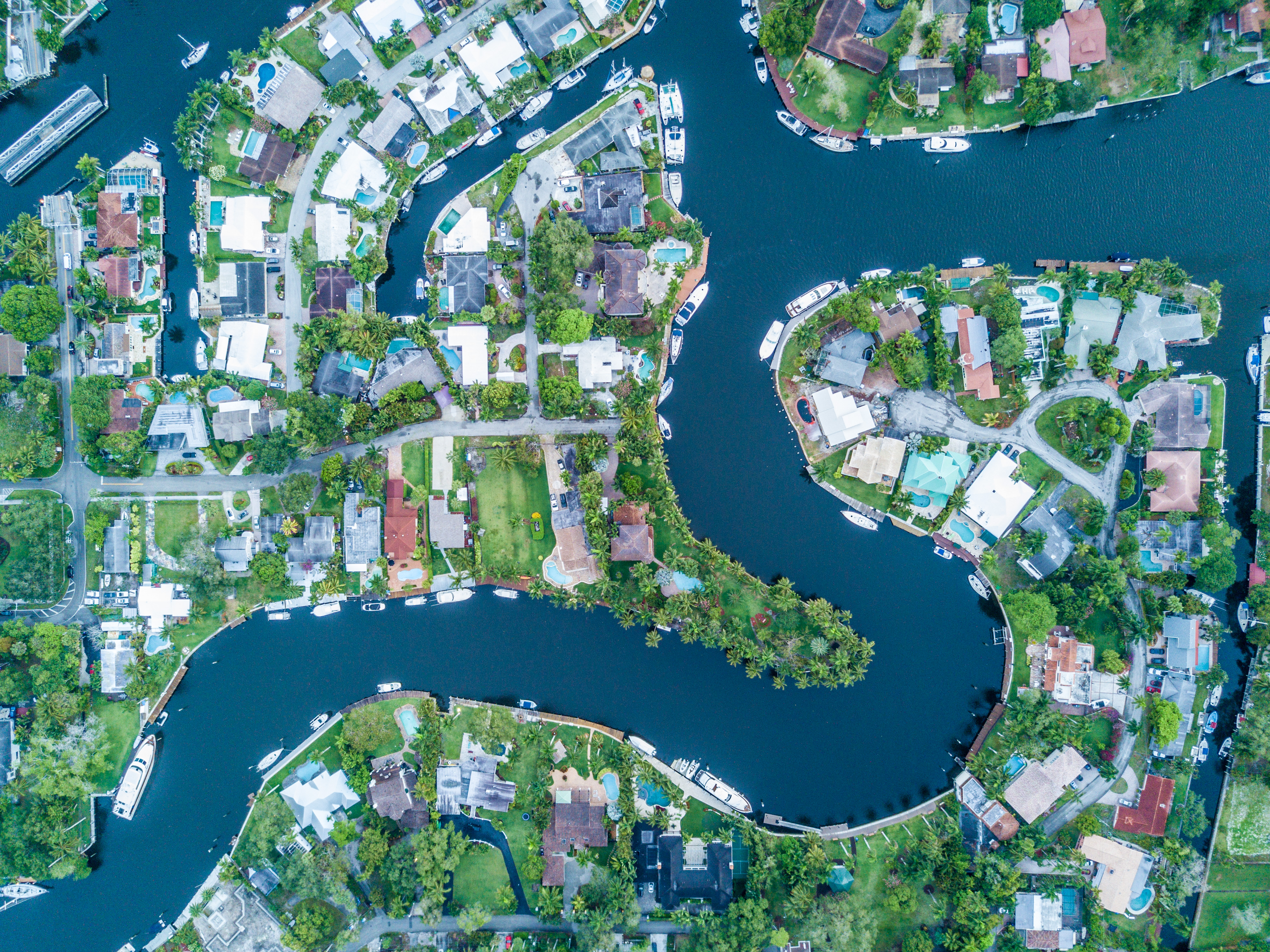
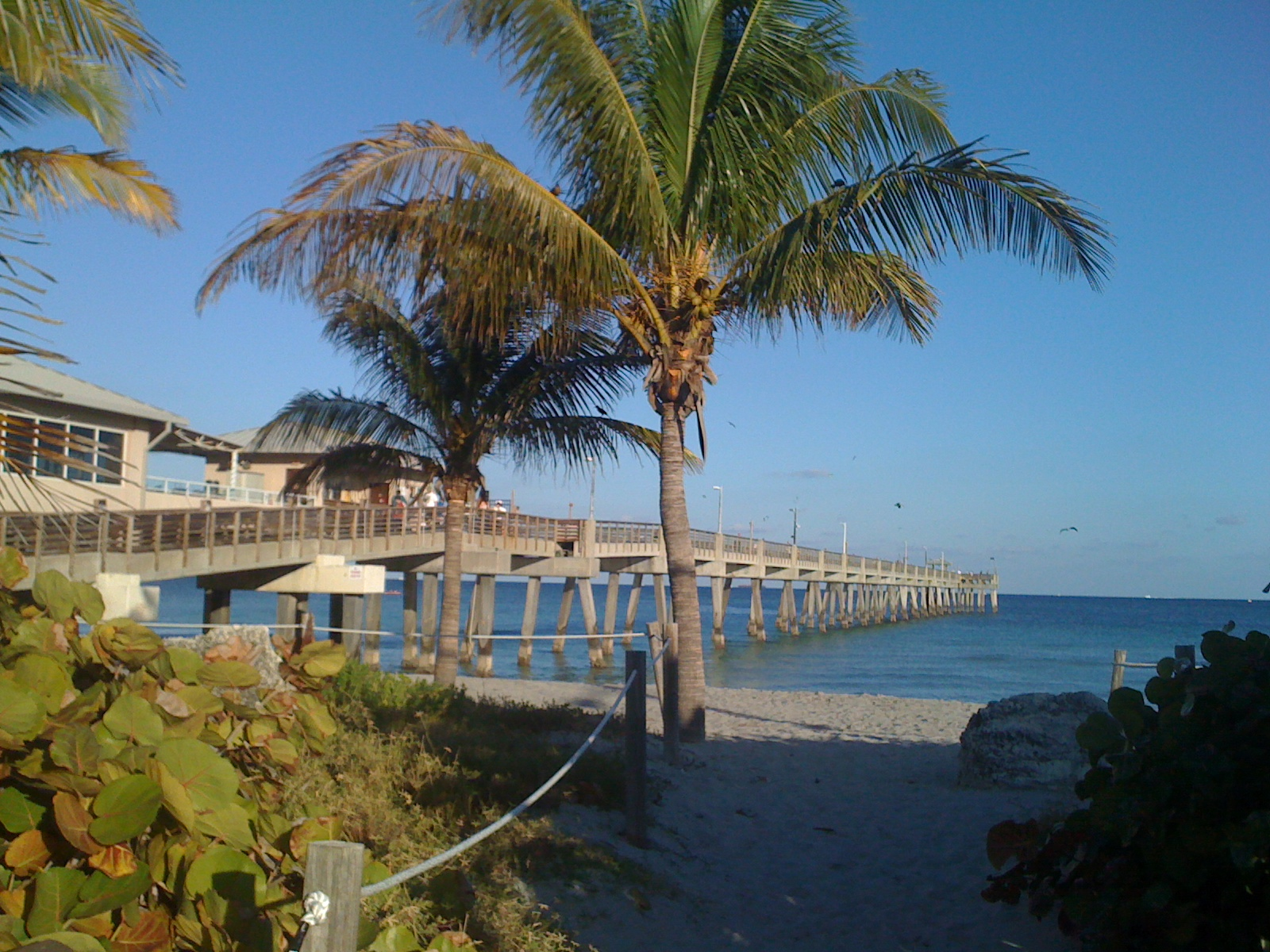
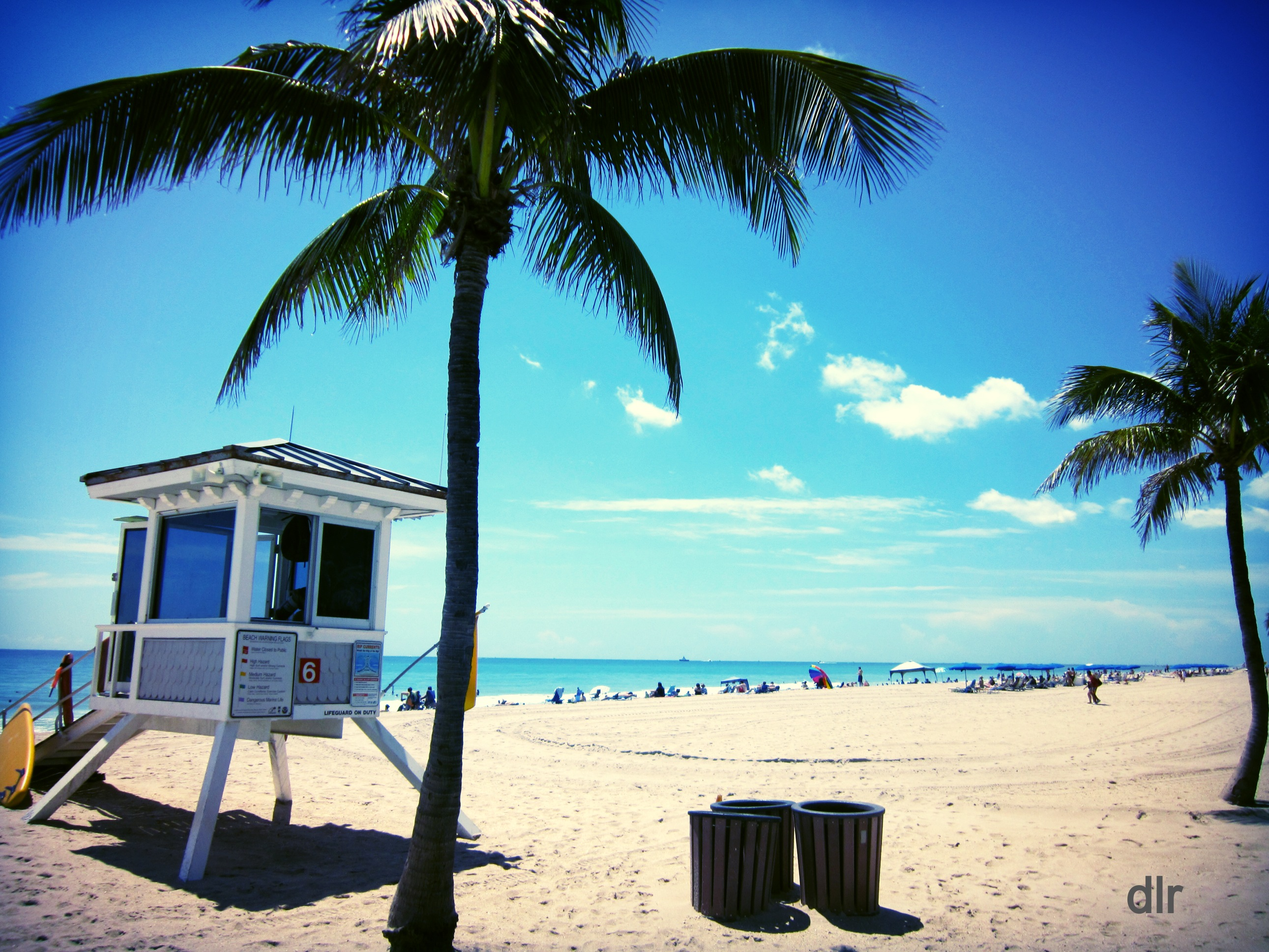
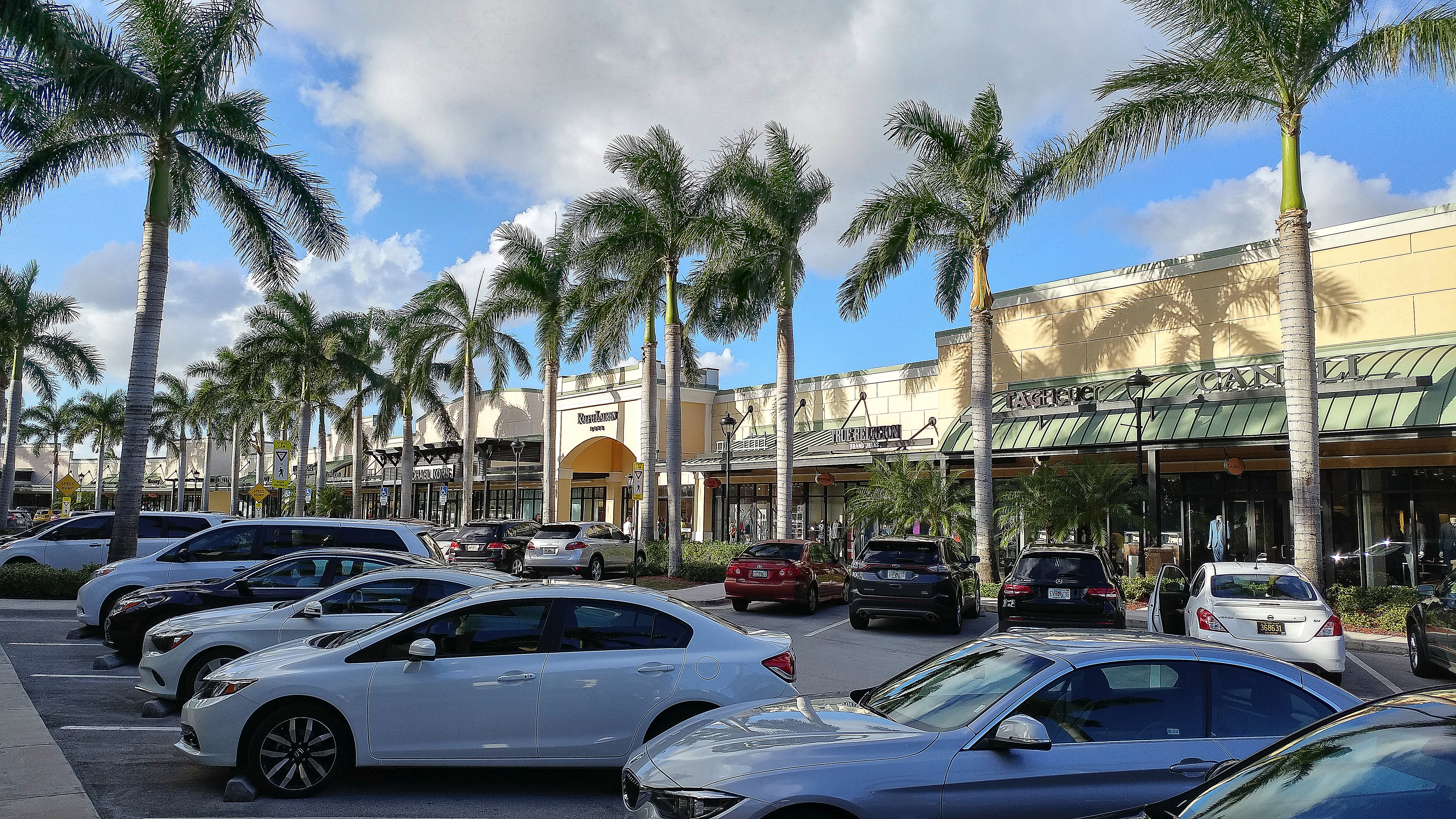
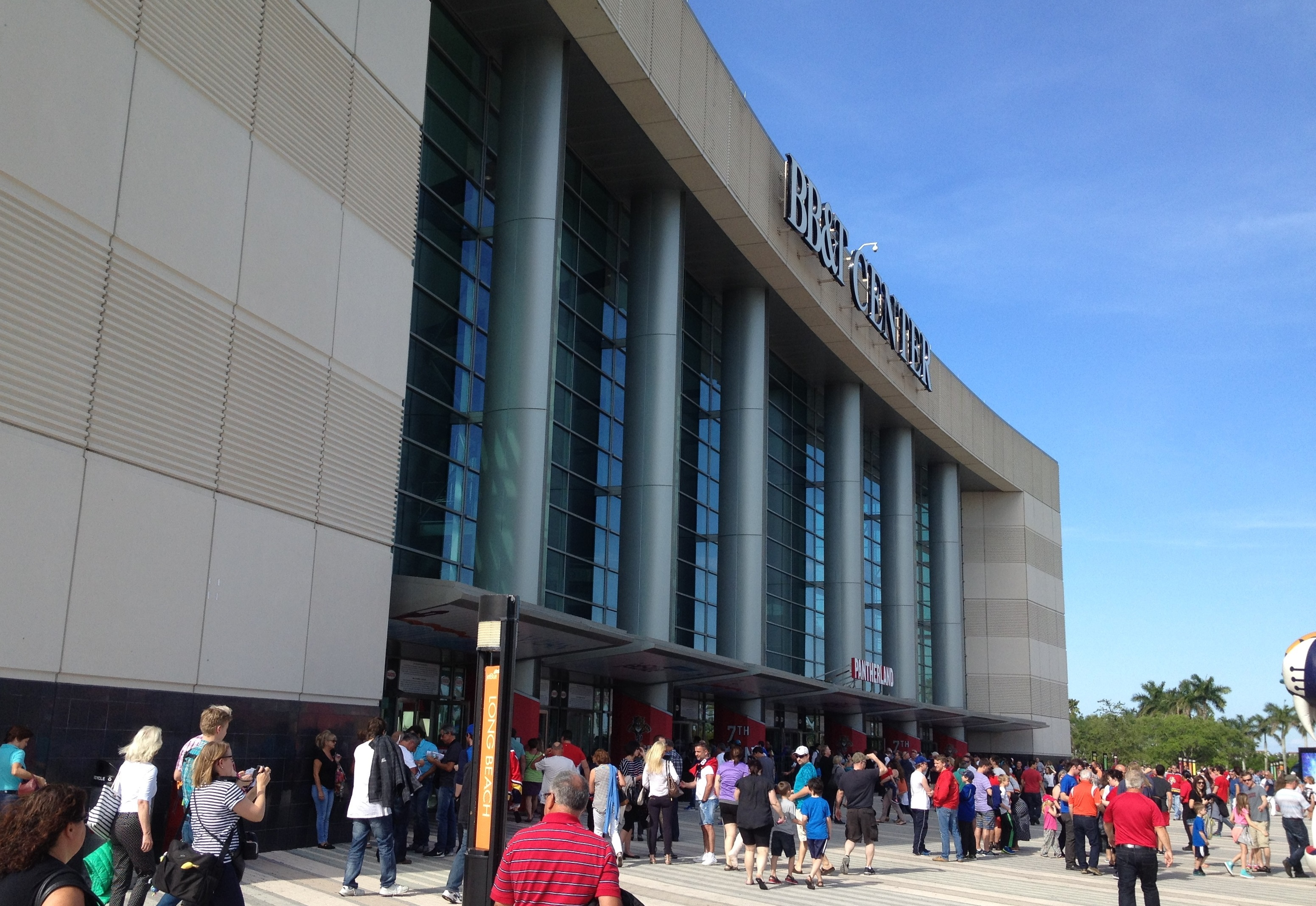
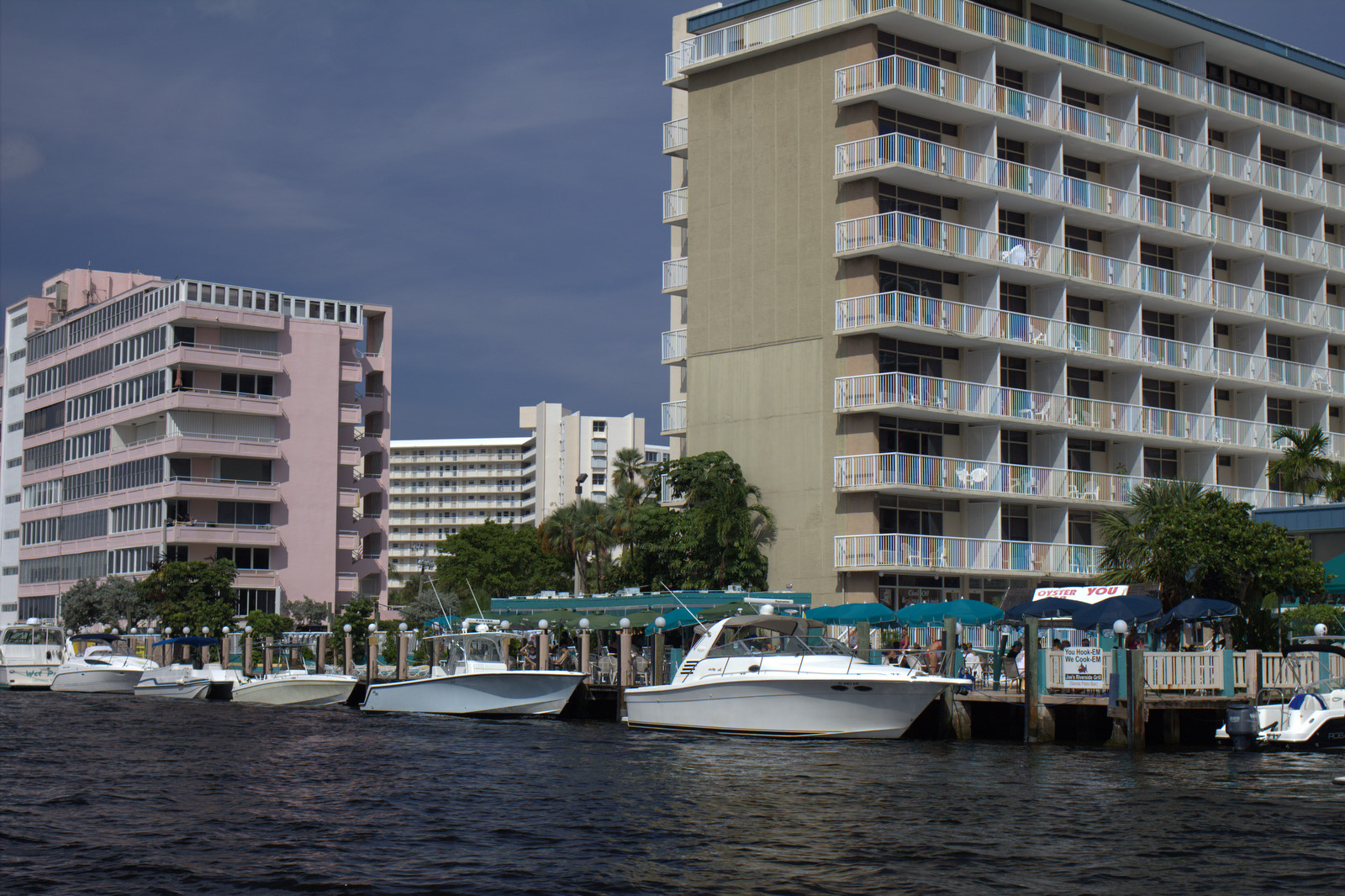
- Images, from top down, left to right: Fort Lauderdale skyline; Hollywood water tower; Tarpon River neighborhood; Dania Beach pier; lifeguard station on Las Olas Beach; Sawgrass Mills shopping mall in Sunrise; Amerant Bank Arena; docked boats in Pompano Beach

- Flag Logo

- Location within the United States
- Coordinates: 26°11′37″N 80°28′36″W
- Country: United States
- State: Florida
- Region: South Florida
- Metro area: Miami
- Founded: April 30, 1915
- Named for: Napoleon B. Broward
- County seat: Fort Lauderdale
- Largest city: Fort Lauderdale
- Incorporated cities: 24

Government
  - Type: Council–manager government
  - Body: Board of County Commissioners
  - Board of County Commissioners: Commissioners: Nan H. Rich (D) (District 1); Mark D. Bogen (D) (District 2); Michael Udine (D) (District 3); Lamar P. Fisher (D) (District 4); Steven A. Geller (D) (District 5); Beam Furr (D) (District 6); Alexandra P. Davis (District 7); Robert McKinzie (D) (District 8); Hazelle P. Rogers (D) (District 9)
  - Mayor: Beam Furr (D)
  - Vice Mayor: Mark D. Bogen (D)
  - County administrator: Monica Cepero

Area
  - County: 1,322.817 sq mi (3,426.08 km^{2})
  - Land: 1,203.105 sq mi (3,116.03 km^{2})
  - Water: 119.712 sq mi (310.05 km^{2})
  - Urban: 409.2 sq mi (1,060 km^{2})
- Highest elevation (Pine Island Ridge): 29 ft (8.8 m)
- Lowest elevation: 0 ft (0 m)

Population (2020)
  - County: 1,944,375
  - Estimate (2025): 2,013,317 ▲
  - Rank: 17th in the United States; 2nd in Florida
  - Density: 1,616.131/sq mi (623.9916/km^{2})
  - Urban density: 4,751/sq mi (1,834/km^{2})

GDP
  - Total: $162.924 billion (2023)
- Time zone: UTC−5 (Eastern Time Zone)
  - Summer (DST): UTC−4 (Eastern Daylight Time)
- ZIP Codes: 33004, 33009, 33314, 33019–33021,33023–33029, 33060, 33062–33069, 33071, 33073, 33076, 33301, 33304–33306, 33308–33317, 33319, 33321–33328, 33330–33332, 33334, 33351, 33441–33442
- Area codes: 754/954
- FIPS code: 12011
- GNIS feature ID: 295753
- Primary airport: Fort Lauderdale–Hollywood International Airport; FLL (major/international)
- Secondary airport: Miami International Airport- MIA (international/neighboring county)- President Donald J. Trump International Airport- PBI (international/neighboring county)- North Perry Airport- HWO (regional)- Fort Lauderdale Executive Airport- FXE (regional)- Pompano Beach Airpark- PMP (regional)
- Interstates: link = Interstate 75 in Florida link = Interstate 95 in Florida link = Interstate 595 (Florida)
- U.S. Routes: link = U.S. Route 1 in Florida link = U.S. Route 27 in Florida link = U.S. Route 441 in Florida
- State roads: link = Florida's Turnpike link = Florida State Road A1A
- Congressional districts: 20th, 23rd, 24th, 25th
- Commuter rail: Amtrak, Brightline, Tri-Rail
- Website: www.broward.org

Broward County (/ˈbraʊ.ərd/ BROURD) is located in Florida, United States located in the Miami metropolitan area and South Florida region. It is Florida's second-most populous county after Miami-Dade County and the 17th-most populous in the United States, with 1,944,375 residents as of the 2020 census. Its county seat and most populous city is Fort Lauderdale, which had a population of 182,760 as of 2020.

Broward County is one of the three counties that make up the Miami metropolitan area, which was home to 6.14 million people in 2020. It is one of the most ethnically diverse counties in the United States. As of 2022, Broward County has a gross domestic product of $124.8 billion, the second-largest GDP of Florida's 67 counties and the 25th-largest for the nation's 3,033 counties.

== History ==
=== Native people ===
The earliest evidence of Native American settlement in the Miami region came from about 12,000 years ago. The first inhabitants settled on the banks of the Miami River, with the main villages on the northern banks.

The inhabitants at the time of first European contact were the Tequesta people, who controlled much of southeastern Florida, including what is now Miami-Dade County, Broward County, and the southern part of Palm Beach County. The Tequesta Indians fished, hunted, and gathered the fruit and roots of plants for food, but did not practice any form of agriculture. They buried the small bones of the deceased with the rest of the body, and put the larger bones in a box for the village people to see. The Tequesta are credited with making the Miami Circle.

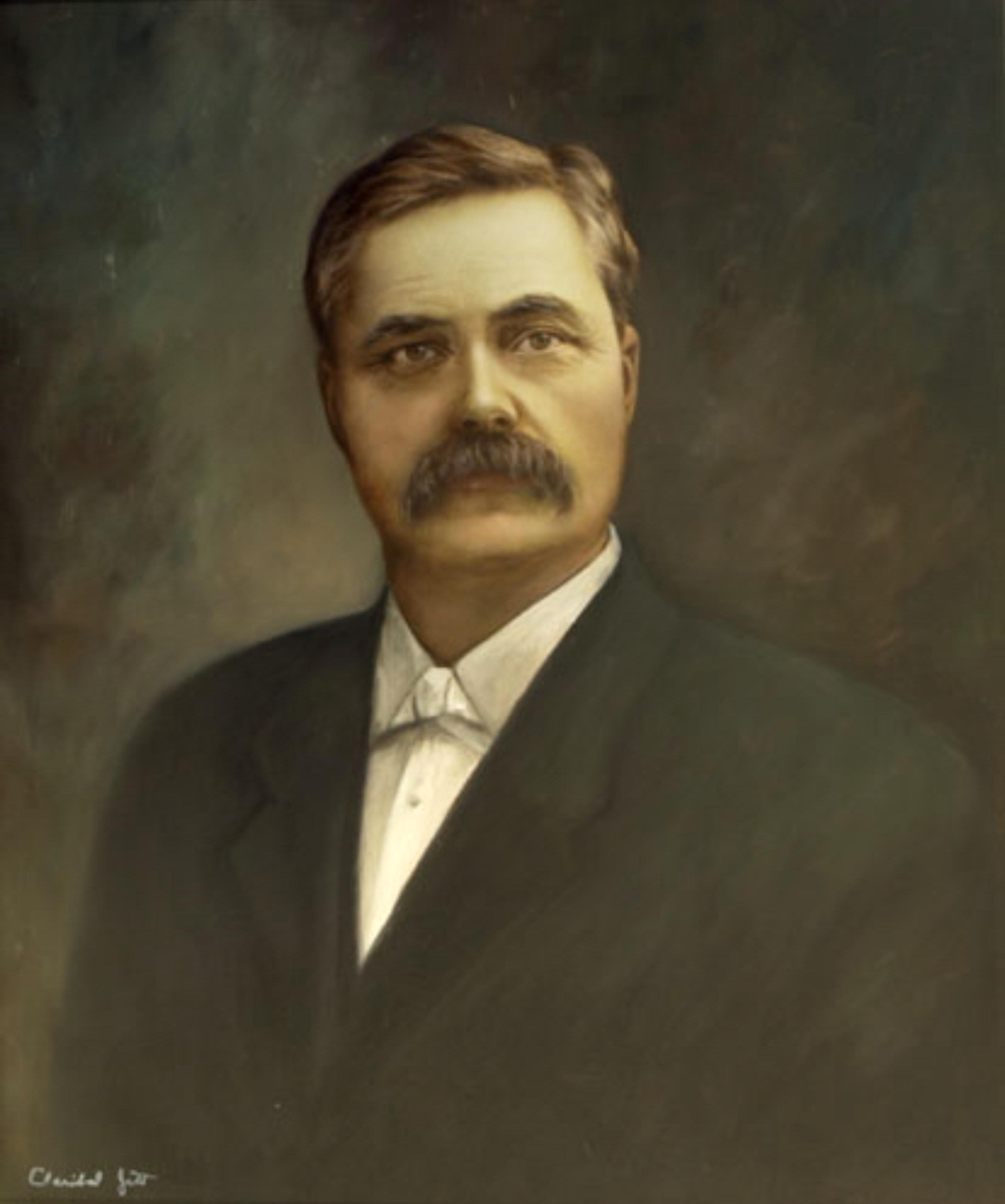
Napoleon Bonaparte Broward (1857–1910)

=== Founding of Broward ===
Broward County was founded on April 30, 1915. It was intended to be named Everglades County, but then-Speaker of the Florida House of Representatives Ion Farris amended the bill that established the county to name it in honor of Napoleon Bonaparte Broward, governor of Florida from 1905 to 1909.

Throughout his term as governor, Broward championed Everglades drainage and was remembered for his campaign to turn the Everglades into "useful land". This opened up much of today's urban Broward County for development, first as agricultural land and later as residential. A year before Broward became governor, Dania became the first incorporated community of what is now Broward County, followed by Pompano in 1908, and Fort Lauderdale in 1911.

In 1915, Palm Beach and Dade counties contributed nearly equal portions of land to create Broward County.

Broward County began a huge development boom after its incorporation, with the first "tourist hotel", in Fort Lauderdale, opening in 1919. A year later, developers began dredging wetlands in the county to create island communities.

=== Land boom and rapid growth ===
By 1925, the boom was considered to have reached its peak, but the 1926 Miami hurricane caused economic depression in the county. The county saw another population and development boom post-World War II when the transformation from agricultural to urbanized residential area began.

In 1967, Coconut Creek was incorporated.

The effects of a national recession hit the county in 1974 and the population growth finally slowed. This is from a peak growth percentage change of 297.9% which saw the population of Broward grow from 83,933 as of 1950 to 333,946 in 1960. The population subsequently experienced an 85.7% population growth which brought the population to a total of 620,100 in 1970.

=== Recent history ===
The structure of the Broward County government was signed into law in 1975 with the passage of the Broward County charter. In the same year, the Seminole Tribe of Florida incorporated as a governing entity and began organizing cigarette sales, bingo and land leases that would bring millions of dollars in annual revenue in later years. In 1976, Interstate 95 was completed through Broward County.

On January 19, 1977, snow fell in South Florida for the first time in recorded history. Snow was seen across all of South Florida as far south as Homestead and even on Miami Beach. Snow was officially reported by weather observers in West Palm Beach, LaBelle, Hollywood, and Royal Palm Ranger Station in southern Miami-Dade County.

In the year 1980, the US census reported over 1 million people living in Broward County.

On August 24, 1992, Hurricane Andrew passed through Broward County County, causing $100 million in damage in the county and leaving many residents homeless.

In the year 2000, the US census reported a total population of 1,623,018. The town of South West Ranches was incorporated this year.

On March 1, 2005, West Park became Broward County's 31st municipality to be incorporated.

On October 24, 2005, Hurricane Wilma hit South Florida leaving the entire area damaged and causing almost universal power outages. Wilma was the most damaging storm in Broward County since Hurricane King in 1950. Broward experienced wind speeds between 80 and 100 mph (130 and 160 km/h) which endured for about five hours.

On February 14, 2018, the city of Parkland became the scene of a deadly mass shooting perpetrated by a 19-year-old former student of Stoneman Douglas High School. The trial of the perpetrator of the shooting, Nikolas Cruz, was held at the Seventeenth Judicial Circuit Court of Florida in Broward County in 2022 with Judge Elizabeth Scherer presiding. Cruz was sentenced to life without the possibility of parole.

In June 2020, following the George Floyd protests, some residents called for the county to be renamed due to Governor Broward's support for segregation and the Back-to-Africa movement.

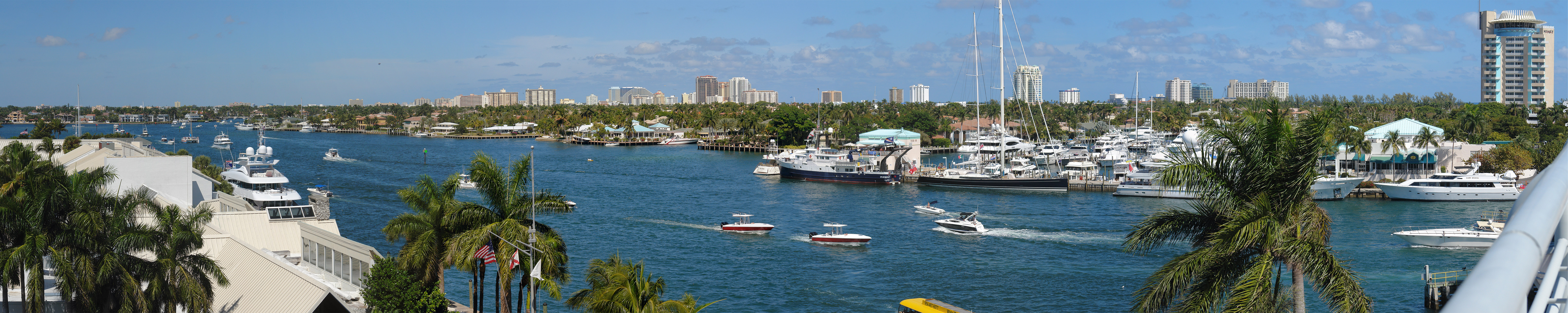
Fort Lauderdale's harbor and skyline

== Geography ==
Broward County, FL

Climate chart (precipitation, max. and min. temperature)
J	F	M	A	M	J	J	A	S	O	N	D
2.7 75 56	2.6 77 58	3.7 80 61	2.9 83 64	4.3 87 69	8.6 90 73	6.9 91 74	7.7 91 74	7.9 90 74	5.1 86 70	3.4 81 65	2.2 77 59
- █ Average max. and min. temperatures in °F
- █ Precipitation totals in inches
Metric conversion
J	F	M	A	M	J	J	A	S	O	N	D
69 24 13	66 25 14	94 27 16	74 29 18	109 31 20	218 32 23	175 33 23	196 33 24	201 32 23	130 30 21	86 27 18	56 25 15
- █ Average max. and min. temperatures in °C
- █ Precipitation totals in mm

According to the U.S. Census Bureau, the county has an area of 1,323 square miles (3,430 km^{2}), of which 1,210 square miles (3,100 km^{2}) is land and 113 square miles (290 km^{2}) (8.5%) is water.

Broward County has an average elevation of six feet (1.8 m) above sea level. It is rather new geologically and at the eastern edge of the Florida Platform, a carbonate plateau created millions of years ago. Broward County is composed of Oolite limestone while western Broward is composed mostly of Bryozoa. Broward is among the last areas of Florida to be created and populated with fauna and flora, mostly in the Pleistocene.

Of developable land in Broward County, approximately 471 square miles (1,219.9 km^{2}), the majority is built upon, as the urban area is bordered by the Atlantic Ocean to the east and the Everglades Wildlife Management Area to the west. Within developable land, Broward County has a population density of 3,740 per square mile (1,444 per square kilometer).

Broward approved the construction of Osborne Reef, an artificial reef made of tires off the Fort Lauderdale beach, but it has proven to be an environmental disaster.

=== Adjacent counties ===
- Palm Beach County - north
- Miami-Dade County - south
- Collier County - west
- Hendry County - northwest
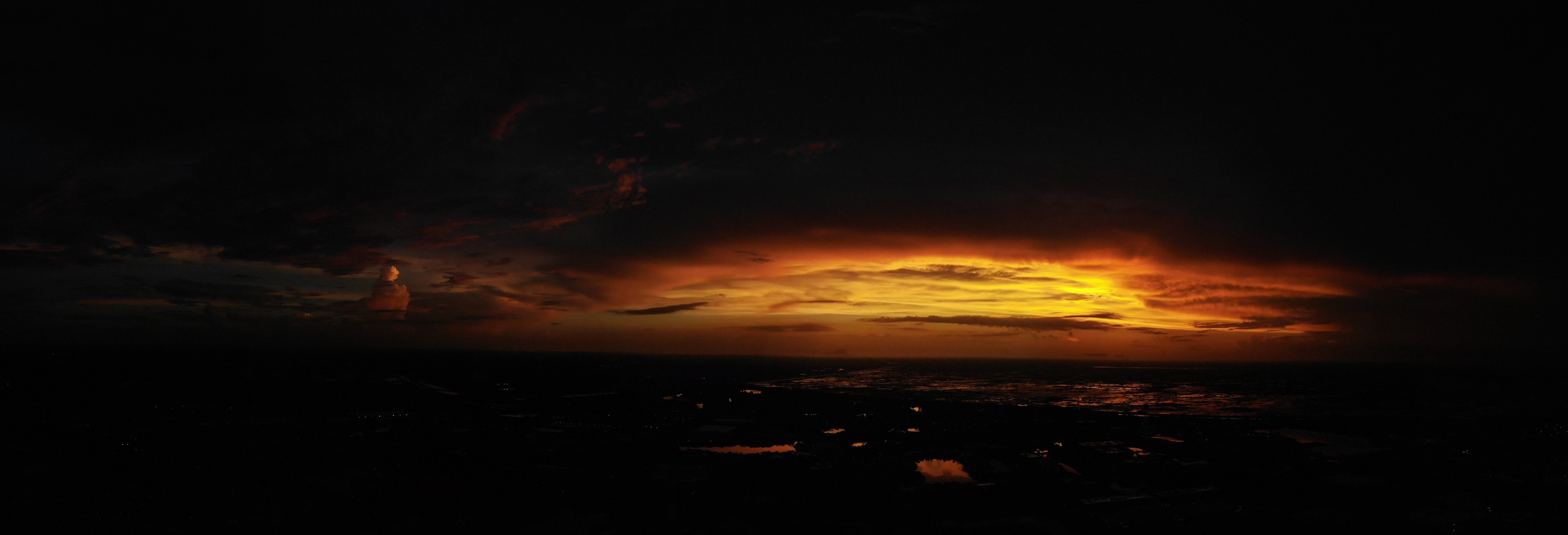
Aerial view of sunset looking westward in Broward County. The Everglades appear in the background. Beyond that is Collier County.

== Demographics ==
Historical population
Census	Pop.	Note	%±
1920	5,135		—
1930	20,094		291.3%
1940	39,794		98.0%
1950	83,933		110.9%
1960	333,946		297.9%
1970	620,100		85.7%
1980	1,018,200		64.2%
1990	1,255,488		23.3%
2000	1,623,018		29.3%
2010	1,748,066		7.7%
2020	1,944,375		11.2%
2025 (est.)	2,013,317	▲	3.5%
U.S. Decennial Census; 1920–1970 1980 1990; 2000 2010 2020 2022

=== 2020 census ===
As of the 2020 census, the county had a population of 1,944,375. The median age was 41.4 years, 20.5% of residents were under the age of 18, and 17.2% were 65 years of age or older. For every 100 females there were 93.4 males, and for every 100 females age 18 and over there were 90.8 males age 18 and over.

The racial makeup of the county was 39.9% White, 27.4% Black or African American, 0.4% American Indian and Alaska Native, 3.9% Asian, <0.1% Native Hawaiian and Pacific Islander, 8.6% from some other race, and 19.8% from two or more races, while Hispanic or Latino residents of any race comprised 31.3% of the population.

100.0% of residents lived in urban areas, while <0.1% lived in rural areas.

There were 756,657 households in the county, of which 30.1% had children under the age of 18 living in them. Of all households, 42.6% were married-couple households, 19.5% were households with a male householder and no spouse or partner present, and 30.9% were households with a female householder and no spouse or partner present. About 27.7% of all households were made up of individuals and 11.5% had someone living alone who was 65 years of age or older.

There were 860,329 housing units, of which 12.1% were vacant. Among occupied housing units, 60.9% were owner-occupied and 39.1% were renter-occupied. The homeowner vacancy rate was 1.6% and the rental vacancy rate was 7.7%.

=== Racial and ethnic composition ===
A map of racial demographics in Broward County, Florida by Census tract. Legend: Non-Hispanic White 30–40% 40–50% 50–60% 60–70% 70–80% 80–90% >90% Hispanic 30–40% 40–50% 50–60% 60–70% 70–80% Black or African American 30–40% 40–50% 50–60% 60–70% 70–80% 80–90% >90% Equal

Broward County, Florida – Racial and ethnic composition Note: the US Census treats Hispanic/Latino as an ethnic category. This table excludes Latinos from the racial categories and assigns them to a separate category. Hispanics/Latinos may be of any race.
Race / Ethnicity (NH = Non-Hispanic)	Pop 1980	Pop 1990	Pop 2000	Pop 2010	Pop 2020	% 1980	% 1990	% 2000	% 2010	% 2020
White alone (NH)	858,423	940,345	941,674	760,817	644,230	84.31%	74.90%	58.02%	43.52%	33.13%
Black or African American alone (NH)	111,258	186,670	325,305	449,677	517,618	10.93%	14.87%	20.04%	25.72%	26.62%
Native American or Alaska Native alone (NH)	1,387	2,391	2,934	3,394	2,917	0.14%	0.19%	0.18%	0.19%	0.15%
Asian alone (NH)	4,933	16,395	36,049	55,692	74,040	0.48%	1.31%	2.22%	3.19%	3.81%
Native Hawaiian or Pacific Islander alone (NH)	x	x	767	762	696	x	x	0.05%	0.04%	0.04%
Other race alone (NH)	1,884	1,248	6,472	9,152	21,389	0.19%	0.10%	0.40%	0.52%	1.10%
Mixed race or Multiracial (NH)	x	x	38,165	30,325	74,782	x	x	2.35%	1.73%	3.85%
Hispanic or Latino (any race)	40,315	108,439	271,652	438,247	608,703	3.96%	8.64%	16.74%	25.07%	31.31%
Total	1,018,200	1,255,488	1,623,018	1,748,066	1,944,375	100.00%	100.00%	100.00%	100.00%	100.00%

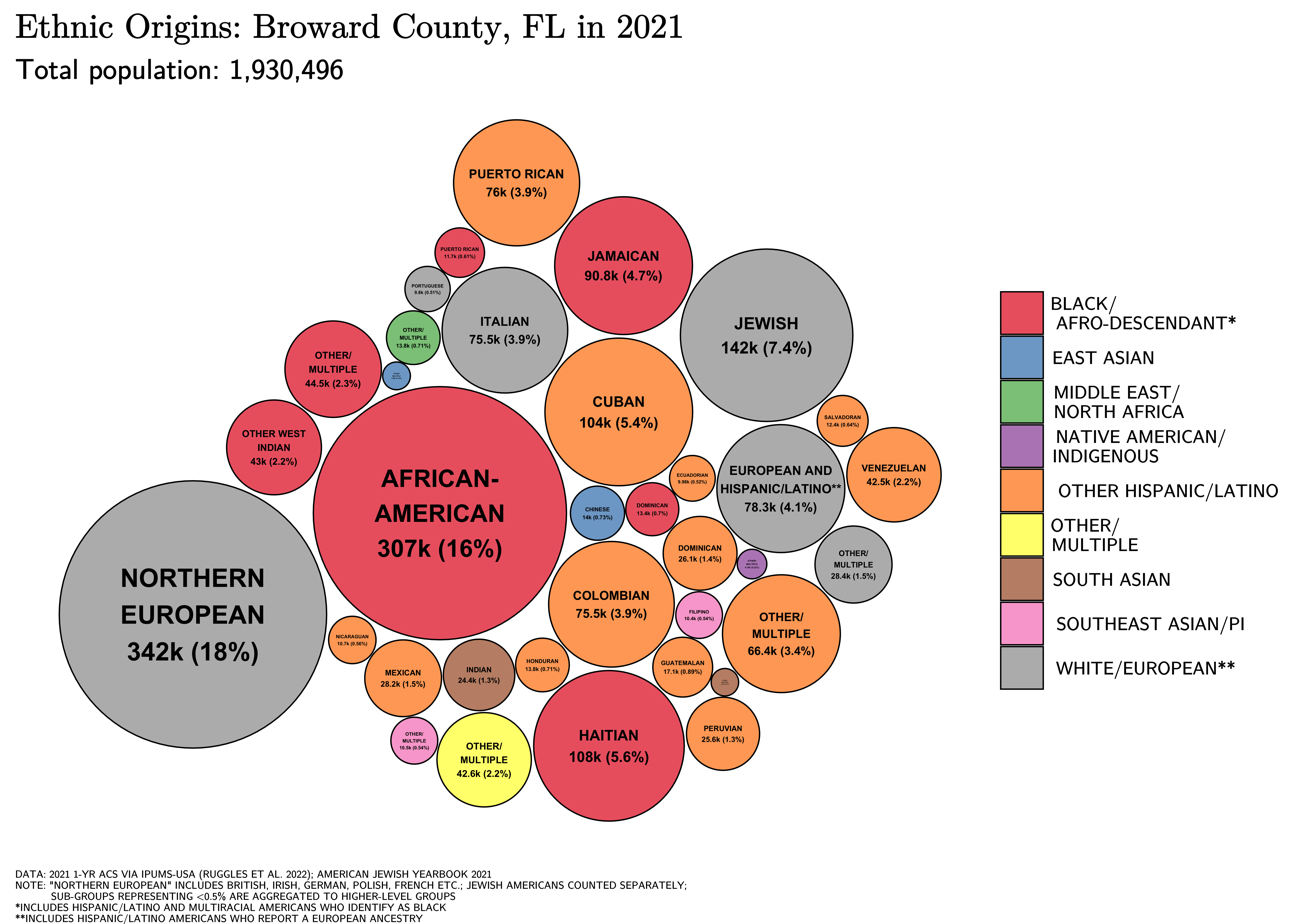
Ethnic origins in Broward County

Demographic characteristics	2020	2010	2000	1990	1980
Households	860,329	810,388	741,043	528,442	417,517
Persons per household	2.26	2.16	2.19	2.38	2.44
Sex Ratio	93.4	93.9	93.3	91.9	91.0
Ages 0–17	20.5%	22.4%	23.6%	20.4%	21.0%
Ages 18–64	62.3%	63.3%	60.3%	58.8%	57.0%
Ages 65 +	17.2%	14.3%	16.1%	20.8%	22.0%
Median age	41.4	39.7	37.8	37.6	38.7
Population	1,944,375	1,748,066	1,623,018	1,255,488	1,018,200

Economic indicators
2018–22 American Community Survey	Broward County	Florida
Median income	$39,690	$37,826
Median household income	$70,331	$67,917
Poverty Rate	12.4%	12.9%
High school diploma	90.0%	89.3%
Bachelor's degree	34.9%	32.3%
Advanced degree	13.3%	12.1%

Language spoken at home (Note: Language spoken at home among residents at least five years old; only languages (or language groups) which at least 2% of residents have spoken at any time since 1980 are mentioned)	2020 (Note: Refers to 2018–2022 American Community Survey data; the last Decennial Census where language data was collected was in the 2000 census)	2010 (Note: Refers to 2008–2012 American Community Survey data; the last Decennial Census where language data was collected was in the 2000 census)	2000	1990	1980
English only	57.5%	62.5%	71.2%	82.3%	88.3%
Spanish or Spanish Creole	27.6%	22.9%	16.3%	8.0%	3.7%
French or Haitian Creole	7.0%	7.2%	5.4%	3.3%	1.4%
Other Languages	7.8%	7.4%	7.1%	6.4%	6.6%

Nativity	2020 (Note: Refers to 2018–2022 American Community Survey data; the last Decennial Census where foreign-born population data was collected was in the 2000 census)	2010 (Note: Refers to 2008–2012 American Community Survey data; the last Decennial Census where foreign-born population data was collected was in the 2000 census)	2000	1990	1980
% population native-born	64.6%	68.6%	74.7%	84.2%	88.9%
... born in the United States	61.0%	65.7%	72.2%	82.3%	87.8%
... born in Puerto Rico or Island Areas	2.1%	1.9%	1.7%	1.1%	1.0%
... born to American parents abroad	1.4%	1.1%	0.8%	0.8%	1.0%
% population foreign-born (Note: Only countries of birth which at least 0.5% of residents were born in at any time since 1980 are mentioned)	35.4%	31.4%	25.3%	15.8%	11.1%
... born in Jamaica	4.5%	4.5%	3.7%	1.8%	0.5%
... born in Haiti	4.4%	4.1%	2.9%	1.5%	N/A (Note: Not counted separately; aggregated into "Other" category)
... born in Colombia	3.4%	2.8%	2.0%	0.8%	N/A
... born in Cuba	3.2%	2.5%	2.0%	1.3%	0.8%
... born in Venezuela	2.5%	1.2%	0.6%	0.1%	N/A
... born in Brazil	1.5%	1.1%	0.9%	0.2%	N/A
... born in Peru	1.2%	1.2%	0.8%	0.3%	N/A
... born in the Dominican Republic	1.0%	0.9%	0.6%	0.2%	< 0.1%
... born in Mexico	1.0%	0.8%	0.7%	0.2%	0.1%
... born in Canada	0.8%	1.0%	1.3%	1.2%	1.4%
... born in Honduras	0.8%	0.6%	0.3%	0.1%	N/A
... born in Trinidad and Tobago	0.7%	0.7%	0.6%	0.5%	N/A
... born in Argentina	0.6%	0.4%	0.3%	0.2%	N/A
... born in India	0.6%	0.5%	0.3%	0.1%	0.1%
... born in China	0.5%	0.35%	0.2%	0.1%	0.1%
... born in El Salvador	0.5%	0.4%	0.3%	0.1%	N/A
... born in Ecuador	0.5%	0.6%	0.3%	0.2%	N/A
... born in the United Kingdom	0.4%	0.5%	0.6%	0.7%	0.7%
... born in Russia	0.3%	0.2%	0.2%	0.5% (Note: Data from the 1980 census and 1990 census pertains to residents born anywhere in the Soviet Union, not just Russia)	0.9%
... born in Italy	0.2%	0.3%	0.4%	0.5%	0.8%
... born in Germany	0.2%	0.3%	0.5%	0.6%	0.8%
... born in Poland	0.2%	0.2%	0.4%	0.6%	0.7%
... born in other countries	6.9%	6.6%	5.6%	4.1%	4.3%

== Law, government, and politics ==
=== Broward County government ===
The Broward County Charter provides for a separation between the legislative and administrative functions of government. The Board of County Commissioners is the legislative branch of Broward County Government. The County Commission is composed of nine members elected from separate districts. Commissioners must be a resident of the district where they seek election. Each year the Commission elects a mayor and vice mayor. The mayor serves as presiding officer of the commission and otherwise exercises primarily ceremonial duties. The Commission appoints the County Administrator, County Attorney and County Auditor.

Broward County Commission
District	Commissioner	Party	Current term ends
1	Nan Rich	Democratic	2028
2	Mark Bogen	Democratic	2026
3	Michael Udine	Democratic	2028
4	Lamar Fisher	Democratic	2026
5	Steven Geller	Democratic	2028
6	Beam Furr	Democratic	2026
7	Alexandra P. Davis	Democratic	2028
8	Robert McKinzie	Democratic	2026
9	Hazelle P. Rogers	Democratic	2028

As required by the Florida Constitution, voters elect a clerk of the circuit court, property appraiser, sheriff, supervisor of elections, and tax collector in countywide elections. The Broward County Sheriff's Office (BSO) has 5,400 employees, and is the largest sheriff's department in Florida. The BSO was founded in 1915. Sheriff Gregory Tony has been the Sheriff heading the agency since 2019, when he replaced Sheriff Scott Israel, who had been Sheriff since 2013.

Broward County elected officials
Office	Officeholder	Party	Current term ends
Sheriff	Gregory Tony	Democratic	2028
Clerk of the Circuit Court	Brenda Forman	Democratic	2028
Property Appraiser	Marty Kiar	Democratic	2028
Supervisor of Elections	Joe Scott	Democratic	2028
Tax Collector	Abbey Ajayi	Democratic	2028

Broward County is coterminous with the Seventeenth Judicial Circuit. The State Attorney for the circuit is Harold Pryor and the Public Defender Gordon Weekes.

=== Politics ===
==== Overview ====
Broward County has been a Democratic stronghold since 1992, voting for the party's presidential nominee in every election since then. It is now considered one of the most reliably Democratic counties in the state, still generally voting for Democrats even in statewide landslide losses, in presidential and gubernatorial elections.

It gave greater than 60% support to the Democratic party nominee in every election since 1996 until 2024. In 2024, Democratic nominee Kamala Harris won below 60% of the vote in the county for the first time since 1992. It had also given Democrat Charlie Crist less than 60% of the vote in the 2022 Florida gubernatorial election.

From 1948 to 1988, the county leaned Republican, voting for the Republican nominee in every election except 1976, even supporting Republican Barry Goldwater by a 56–44 margin while he lost the national election in a landslide.

Unlike Miami-Dade County to the south, where many of the immigrants are Republican-leaning Cuban-Americans, Cubans comprise only a small proportion of the immigrant population in Broward County. The county's population is also over 25% African American, a predominantly Democratic-leaning group.

Previous gubernatorial election results
Year	Republican	Democratic	Third parties
2022	41.97% 251,238 (DeSantis/Incumbent)	57.35% 343,286 (Crist)	0.68% 4,083
2018	31.30% 222,012 (DeSantis)	67.98% 482,152 (Gillum)	0.68% 5,015
2014	29.52% 138,394 (Scott/Incumbent)	68.02% 318,950 (Crist)	2.46% 11,549
2010	33.40% 140,445 (Scott)	64.59% 271,606 (Sink)	2.01% 8,480
2006	35.09% 143,043 (Crist)	62.81% 256,072 (Davis)	2.10% 8,558
2002	40.02% 175,756 (Bush/Incumbent)	59.05% 259,370 (McBride)	0.93% 4,076
1998	37.93% 137,494 (Bush)	62.07% 225,010 (McKay)	0.00% 8
1994	34.61% 138,333 (Bush)	65.39% 261,368 (Chiles/Incumbent)	0.00% 11
1990	34.37% 113,869 (Martinez/Incumbent)	65.63% 217,422 (Chiles)	0.00% 12

United States presidential election results for Broward County, Florida-->
Year	Republican		Democratic		Third party(ies)	
Year	No.	%	No.	%	No.	%
1916	158	22.57%	382	54.57%	160	22.86%
1920	442	44.24%	415	41.54%	142	14.21%
1924	407	41.45%	421	42.87%	154	15.68%
1928	2,889	63.63%	1,564	34.45%	87	1.92%
1932	1,717	34.27%	3,293	65.73%	0	0.00%
1936	1,906	30.30%	4,385	69.70%	0	0.00%
1940	3,988	38.31%	6,422	61.69%	0	0.00%
1944	5,583	47.45%	6,183	52.55%	0	0.00%
1948	9,933	50.88%	7,096	36.35%	2,492	12.77%
1952	26,506	69.10%	11,854	30.90%	0	0.00%
1956	43,552	72.45%	16,561	27.55%	0	0.00%
1960	68,294	58.82%	47,811	41.18%	0	0.00%
1964	85,264	55.49%	68,406	44.51%	0	0.00%
1968	106,122	54.50%	56,613	29.07%	31,992	16.43%
1972	196,528	72.41%	74,127	27.31%	754	0.28%
1976	161,411	47.15%	176,491	51.55%	4,441	1.30%
1980	229,693	55.95%	146,323	35.64%	34,545	8.41%
1984	254,608	56.68%	194,584	43.32%	34	0.01%
1988	220,316	50.00%	218,274	49.54%	2,015	0.46%
1992	164,832	30.92%	276,361	51.85%	91,857	17.23%
1996	142,870	28.29%	320,779	63.51%	41,449	8.21%
2000	177,939	30.93%	387,760	67.41%	9,540	1.66%
2004	244,674	34.61%	453,873	64.21%	8,325	1.18%
2008	237,729	32.34%	492,640	67.02%	4,722	0.64%
2012	244,101	32.23%	508,312	67.12%	4,941	0.65%
2016	260,951	31.16%	553,320	66.08%	23,117	2.76%
2020	333,409	34.74%	618,752	64.48%	7,479	0.78%
2024	358,952	41.04%	507,328	58.01%	8,259	0.94%

==== Voter registration ====
According to the Secretary of State's office, Democrats maintain a plurality among registered voters in Broward County. The county is also one of the few counties in the state where Independents outnumber Republicans.

Registered voters as of April 30, 2025:
Total population	2,037,472	
Registered voters	1,181,801	~58%
Democratic	521,669	44.14%
Republican	279,154	23.62%
Democratic–Republican spread	+242,515	+20.52%
Minor parties	28,741	2.43%
No party affiliation	352,237	29.80%

=== Ordinances ===
Broward's code of ordinances consists of resolutions, administrative rules and regulations passed in order to secure a responsive and efficient form of local government.

The county maintains a distinctive rule regarding communication between the county and bidders for county contracts, known as the Cone of Silence. This rule prevents staff involved in a purchasing process from communicating with bidders from the time when the solicitation is issued, and County Commissioners from the time when bids are opened, until the vote to award the contract or the time when all bids are rejected.

== Economy ==
Silver Airways has its headquarters on the property of Fort Lauderdale-Hollywood International Airport in an unincorporated area. Other companies with headquarters in unincorporated areas include Locair.

Spirit Airlines relocated its headquarters to Dania Beach on April 18, 2024. Prior to that, the airline operated out of Miramar for 24 years, since December 1999.

When Chalk's International Airlines existed, its headquarters was on the grounds of the airport in an unincorporated area. When Bimini Island Air existed, its headquarters were in an unincorporated area.

By far the largest agricultural sector is nurseries, greenhouses, floricultures, and sod. This supplies ornamental uses in the area.

== Education ==
=== Primary and secondary schools ===
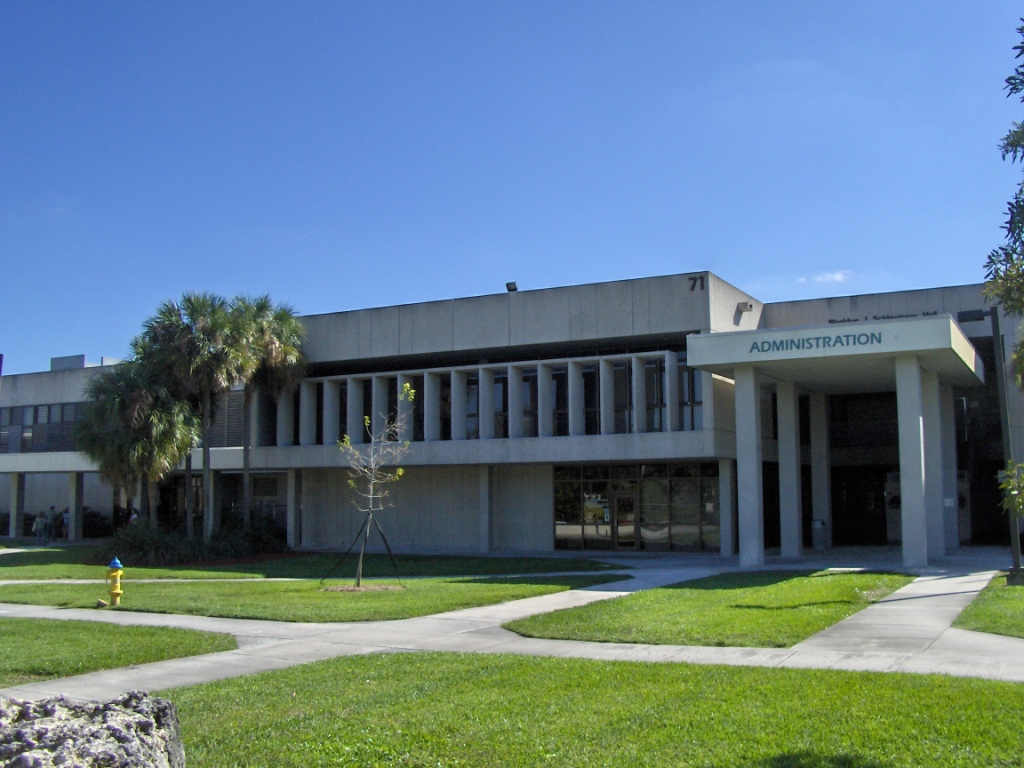
Broward College South Campus administration building

Broward County Schools, the sole school district in the county, has the sixth largest school district in the country and the second largest in the state after the Miami-Dade district.

=== Regionally accredited colleges and universities ===
- Broward College
- Florida Atlantic University (Branch campuses)
- Nova Southeastern University
- Keiser University

=== Other adult education providers ===
- DeVry University
- University of Phoenix
- The Art Institute of Fort Lauderdale
- Florida Career College
- Brown Mackie College
- Atlantic Technical Center and Technical High School
- McFatter Technical College and Technical High School
- Sheridan Technical College and Technical High School

=== Public libraries ===
The Broward County Library is one of the largest public library systems in the country, comprising 38 branch locations. There are also five municipal public libraries in the county that are not part of the Broward County Library system: Ethel M. Gordon Oakland Park Library, Lighthouse Point Library, Helen B. Hoffman Plantation Library, Richard C. Sullivan Public Library of Wilton Manors, and Parkland Public Library.

==== Library Resources ====
Broward County libraries provide many resources to the public. For high-schoolers looking to prepare themselves for college, the library offers college readiness & SAT/ACT prep courses. For adults looking to learn computer skills, adult computer classes are also offered. These resources are free of cost, therefore, all it takes is registering to participate. In addition to the many resources offered at the library, bus passes are also sold at most Broward County libraries. If you want to enjoy some of these resources, you can simply download the app to utilize them on the go. There are nine apps available for download: Broward County Library (BCL WoW), Freegal Music, Hoopla, Overdrive, Libby, Axis 360, RBdigital Magazines, Rosetta Stone, and Brainfuse.

== Sites of interest ==
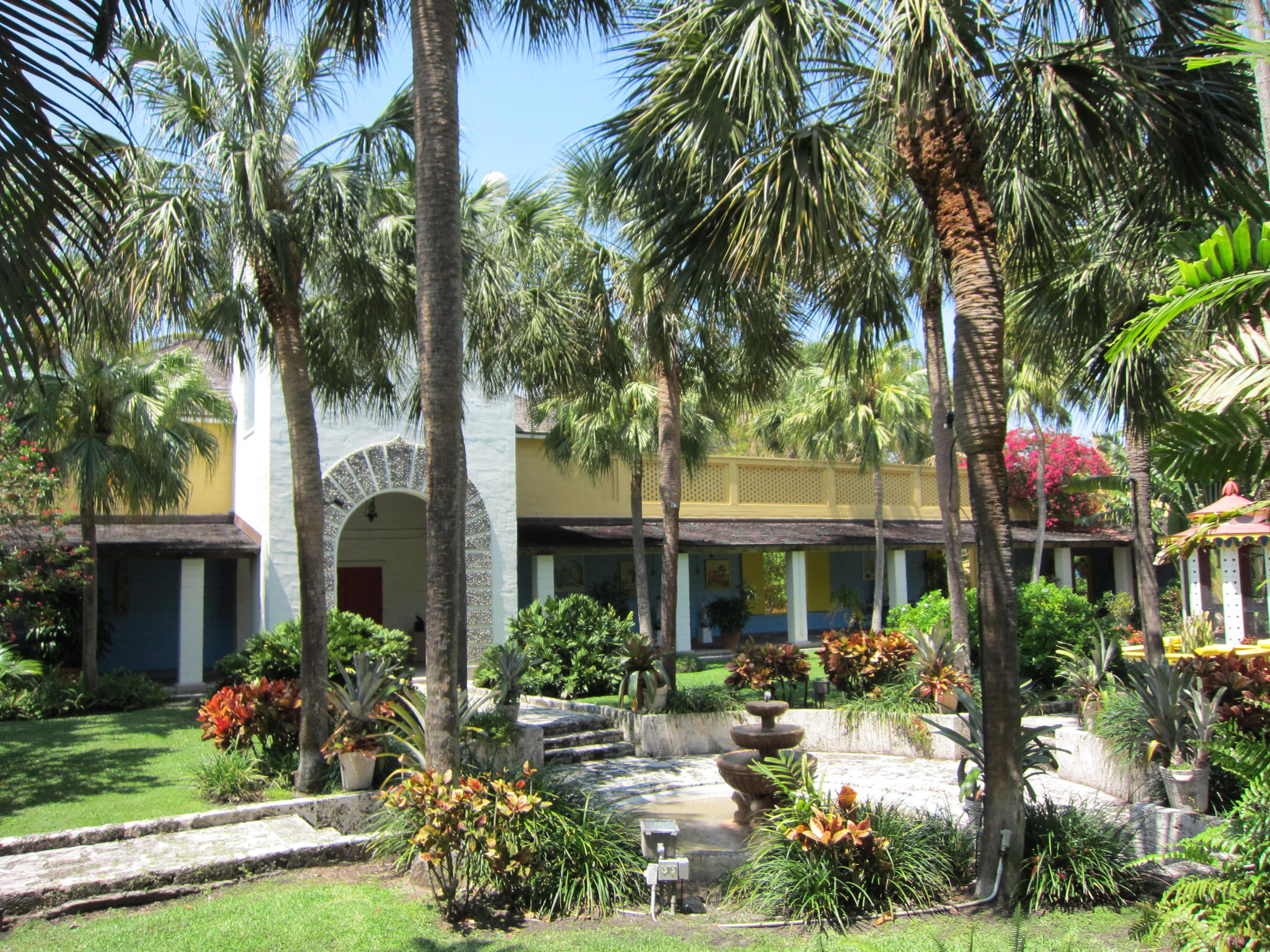
Bonnet House Museum & Gardens, Fort Lauderdale

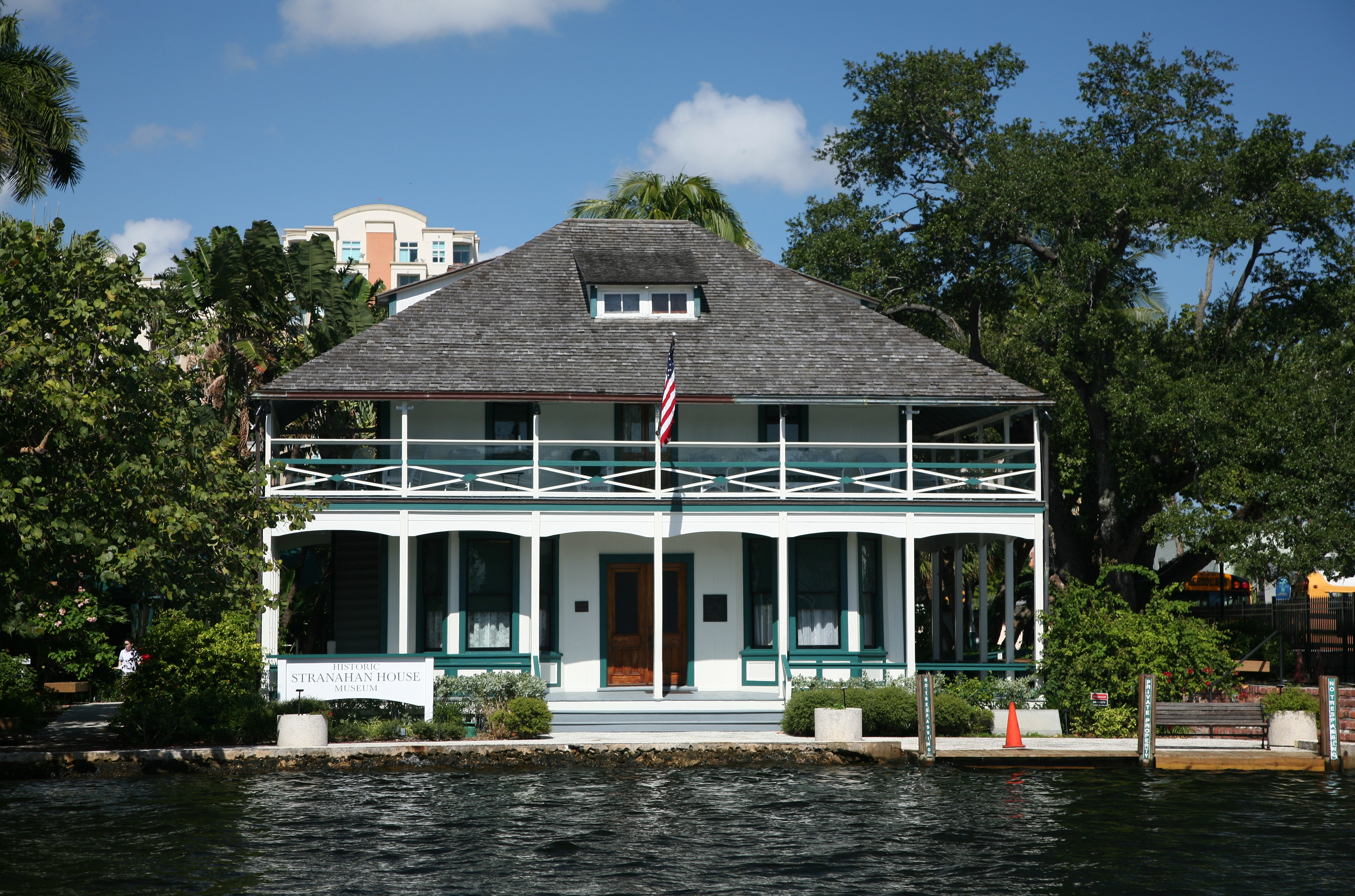
Stranahan House, Fort Lauderdale

=== Museums and historical collections ===
- African-American Research Library and Cultural Center, Fort Lauderdale
- Bonnet House Museum & Gardens, Fort Lauderdale
- Coral Springs Museum of Art, Coral Springs
- Fort Lauderdale Antique Car Museum, Fort Lauderdale
- Fort Lauderdale History Center, Fort Lauderdale
- Naval Air Station Fort Lauderdale Museum, Fort Lauderdale
- NSU Art Museum, Fort Lauderdale
- Plantation Historical Museum, Plantation
- Stranahan House, Fort Lauderdale
- The International Game Fish Association, including the Fishing Hall of Fame & Museum, Dania Beach
- The International Swimming Hall of Fame, Fort Lauderdale
- The Museum of Discovery and Science, Fort Lauderdale
- Wiener Museum of Decorative Arts, Dania Beach
- Young at Art Museum, Davie

=== Nature and wildlife areas ===
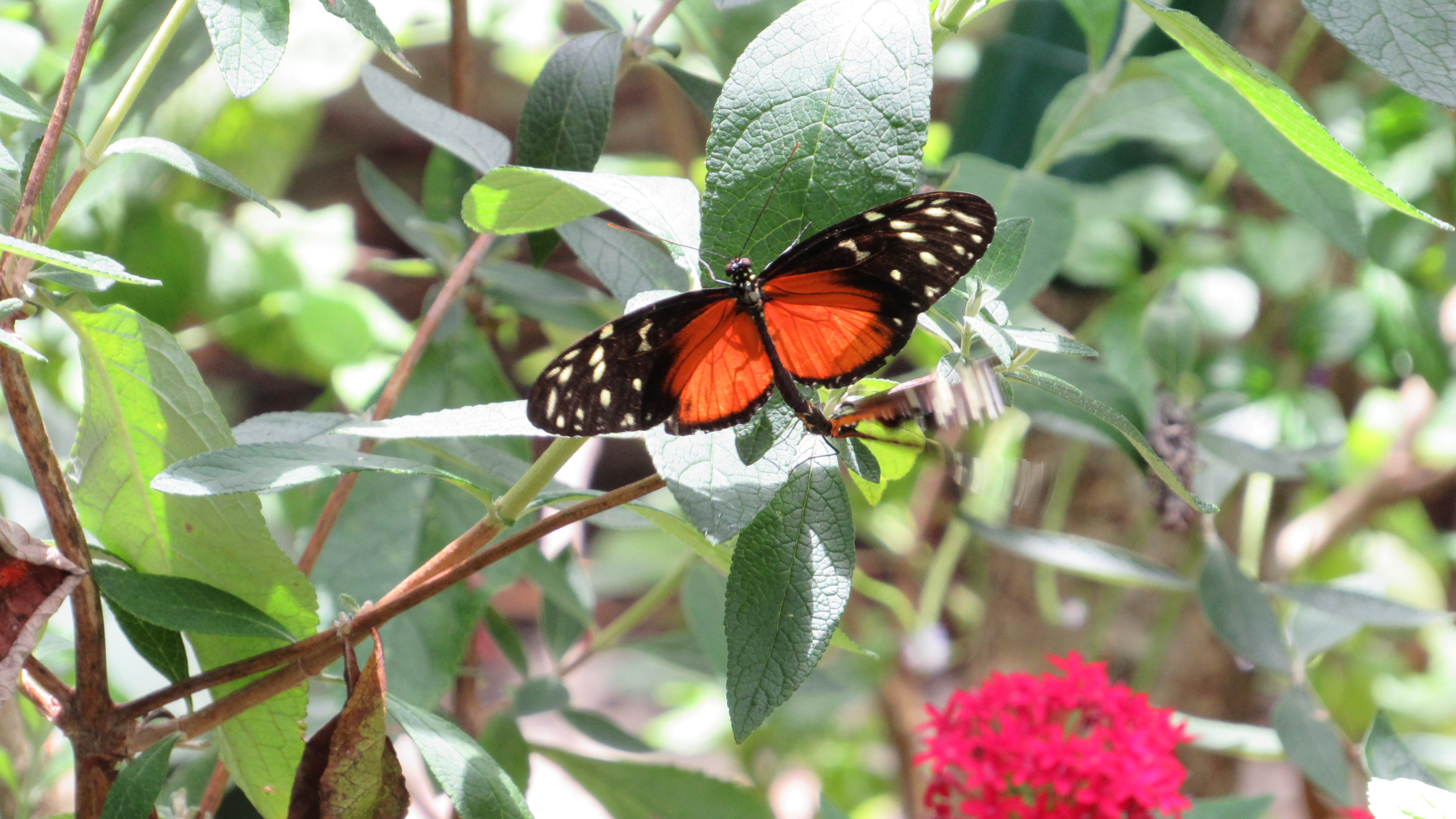
Butterfly World, Coconut Creek

- Anne Kolb Nature Center, Hollywood
- Butterfly World, a botanical sanctuary in Coconut Creek
- Everglades Holiday Park, featuring airboat rides and alligator shows
- Fern Forest Nature Center, Coconut Creek
- Flamingo Gardens, a botanical garden and wildlife sanctuary
- Secret Woods Nature Center, Dania Beach
- Sawgrass Recreation Park
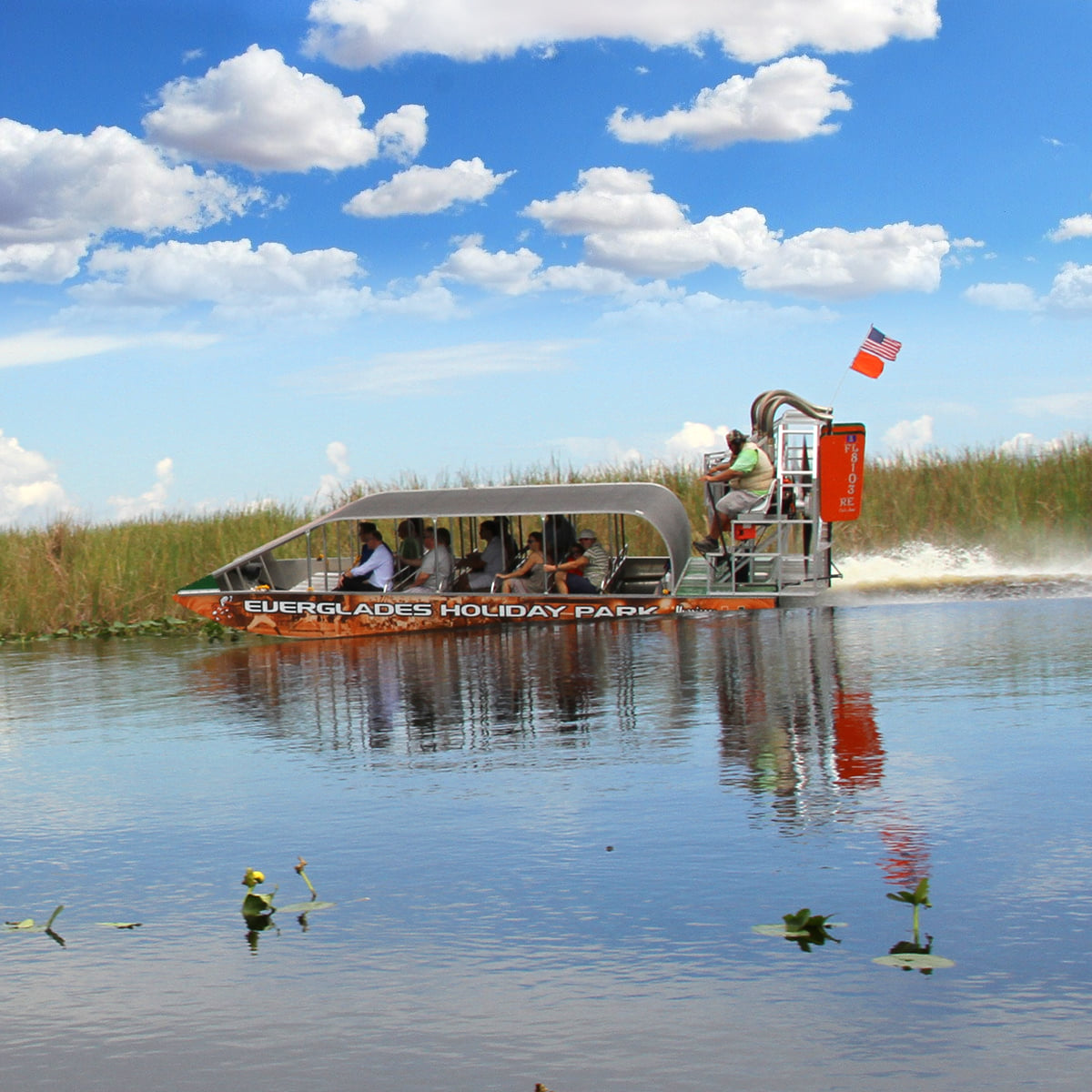
  An airboat tour in Everglades Holiday Park

=== Other areas and attractions ===
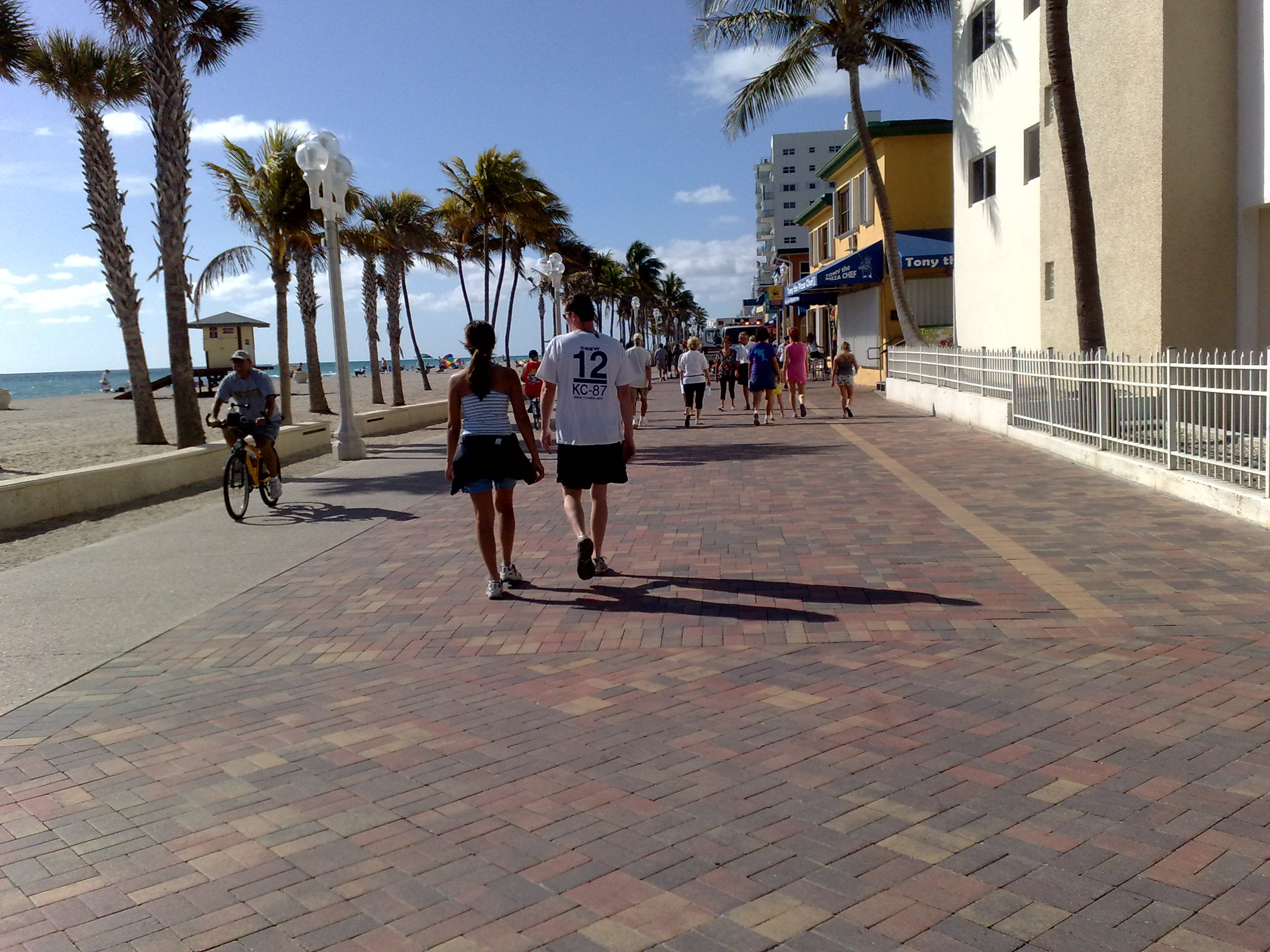
Hollywood Beach Broadwalk

- Beach Place, a strip of stores, restaurants, and bars across the street from the beach along the Atlantic coast, in Fort Lauderdale
- Broward Center for the Performing Arts
- Hollywood Beach Broadwalk
- Florida Grand Opera
- Fort Lauderdale Swap Shop (colloquially known to locals as simply the Swap Shop)
- Sawgrass Mills, a large outlet shopping mall in Sunrise
- Amerant Bank Arena in Sunrise, where the NHL's Florida Panthers play their games
- The Festival Flea Market Mall in Pompano Beach, America's largest indoor flea market
- Riverside Hotel, Fort Lauderdale's oldest continuously operating hotel
- Riverwalk (Fort Lauderdale)

Additionally, with 23 miles of beach, Broward County is a popular destination for scuba diving, snorkeling, and droves of young Spring break tourists from around the world.

== Transportation ==
=== Airports ===
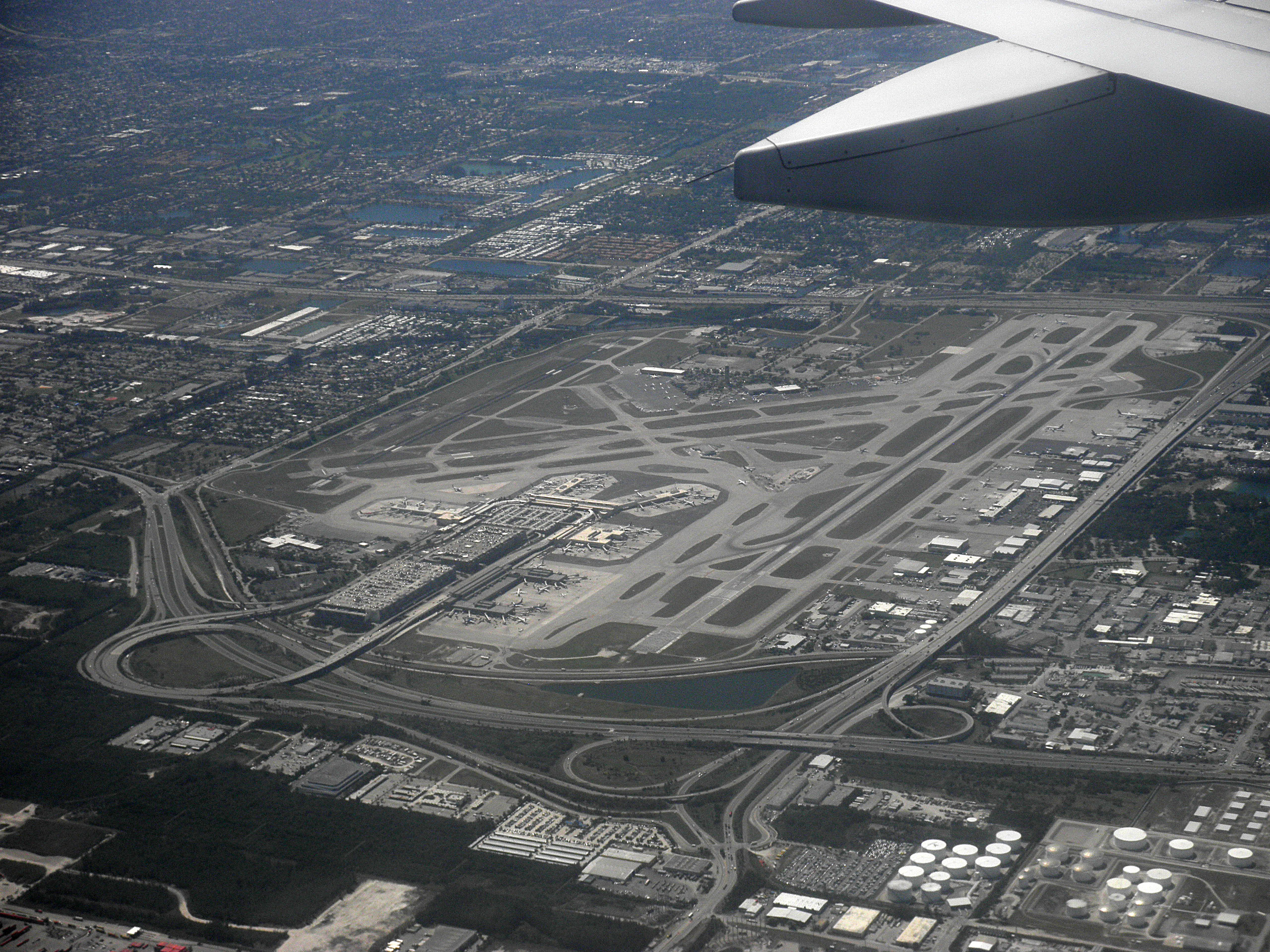
Fort Lauderdale–Hollywood International Airport

Fort Lauderdale–Hollywood International Airport serves as the primary airport of the Broward County area. The airport is bounded by the cities Fort Lauderdale, Hollywood and Dania Beach, three miles (4.8 km) southwest of downtown Fort Lauderdale and 21 mi (34 km) north of Miami. The airport is near cruise line terminals at Port Everglades and is popular among tourists bound for the Caribbean. Since the late 1990s, FLL has become an intercontinental gateway, although Miami International Airport still handles most long-haul flights. FLL is ranked as the 19th busiest airport (in terms of passenger traffic) in the United States, as well as the nation's 14th busiest international air gateway and one of the world's 50 busiest airports. FLL is classified by the US Federal Aviation Administration as a "major hub" facility serving commercial air traffic. In 2017 the airport processed 32,511,053 passengers (11.3% more than 2016) including 7,183,275 international passengers (18.6% more than 2016).

- North Perry Airport
- Fort Lauderdale Executive Airport
- Pompano Beach Airpark
- Downtown Fort Lauderdale Heliport

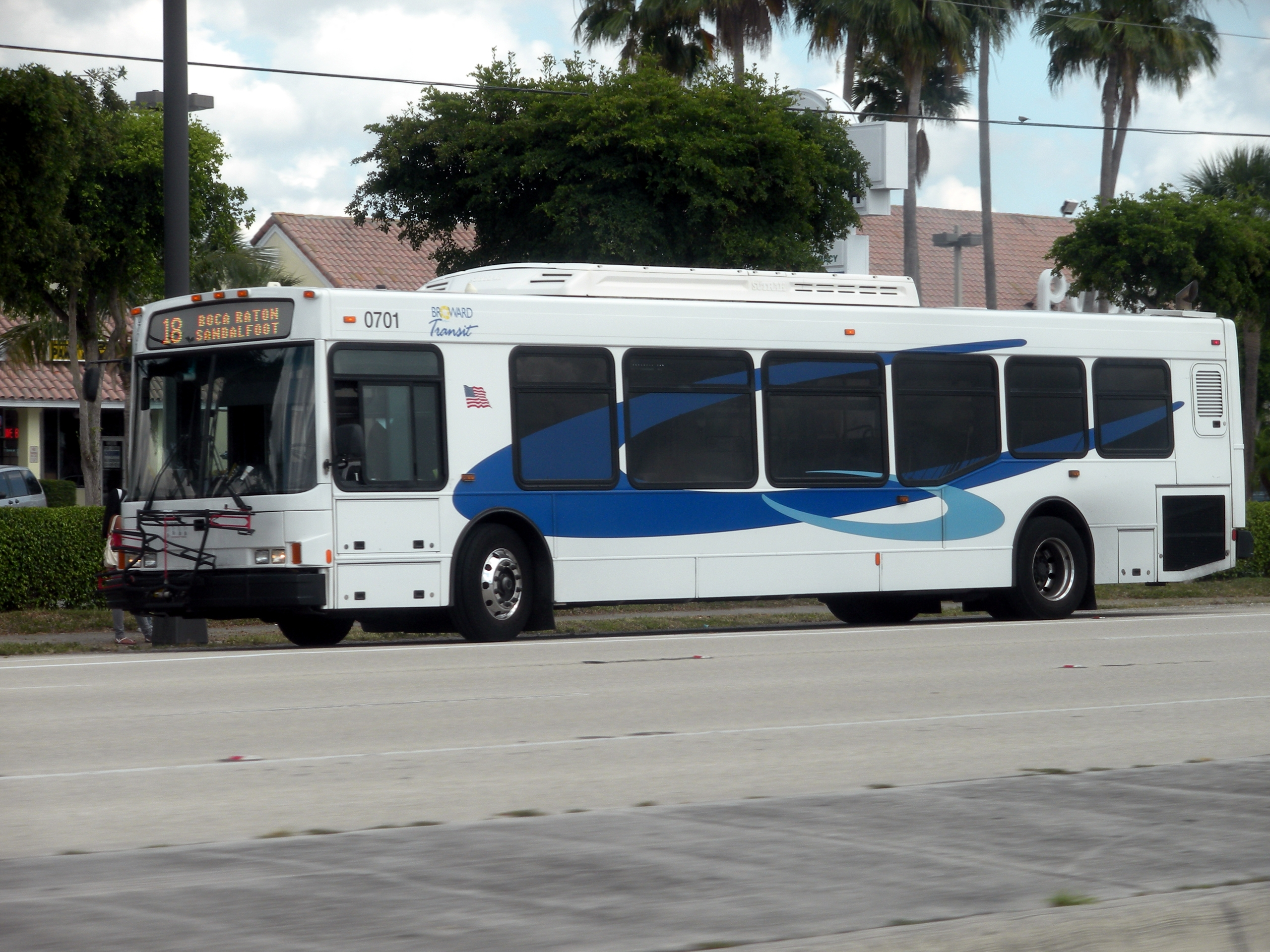
A Broward County Transit bus in the current "Breeze" livery.

=== Public transportation ===
- Broward County Transit
- Sun Trolley

=== Major expressways ===
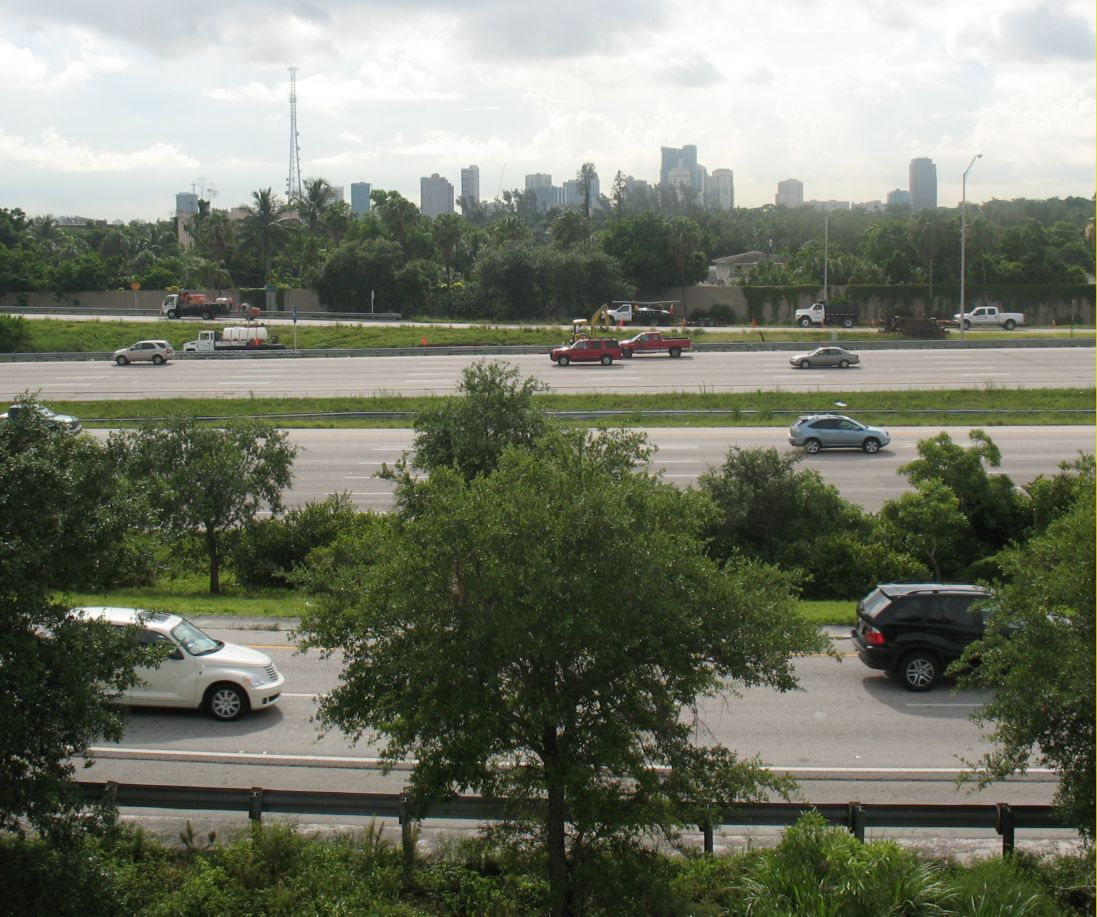
Interstate 95 as it passes through Fort Lauderdale. The city's skyline can be seen in the background.

- Interstate 95
- Interstate 75
- Interstate 595 (Port Everglades Expressway)
- Florida's Turnpike (SR 91)
- Homestead Extension (SR 821)
- State Road 869 (Sawgrass Expressway)

=== Railroads ===
- Passenger services: Amtrak, Brightline, and Tri-Rail
- Freight services: Florida East Coast Railway and CSX Transportation

=== Street grid ===
A street grid stretches throughout Broward County. Most of this grid is loosely based on three primary eastern municipalities, (from South to North) Hollywood, Fort Lauderdale, and Pompano Beach. Deerfield Beach—another primary eastern municipality—has its own street grid, as do two smaller municipalities—Dania Beach and Hallandale Beach.

=== Greenways System ===
Construction is underway on a network of recreational trails to connect cities and points of interest in the county.

== Communities ==
Map of the municipalities (colored areas) and unincorporated communities (grey areas) of Broward County

=== Municipalities ===
Municipality populations are based on the 2020 US census using their QuickFacts with 5,000 residents and above, while municipalities under 5,000 people are based on their US Decennial Census.

#	Incorporated community	Designation	Date incorporated	Population
1	Parkland	City	July 10, 1963	34,670
2	Coconut Creek	City	February 20, 1967	57,833
3	Deerfield Beach	City	June 11, 1925	86,859
4	Coral Springs	City	July 10, 1963	134,394
5	Margate	City	May 30, 1955	58,712
6	Pompano Beach	City	June 6, 1908	112,046
7	Lighthouse Point	City	June 13, 1956	10,486
8	Hillsboro Beach	Town	June 12, 1939	1,987
9	Tamarac	City	August 15, 1963	71,897
10	North Lauderdale	City	July 10, 1963	44,794
11	Lauderdale-by-the-Sea	Town	November 30, 1927	6,198
12	Sea Ranch Lakes	Village	October 6, 1959	540
13	Oakland Park	City	June 10, 1929	44,229
14	Wilton Manors	City	May 13, 1947	11,426
15	Lazy Lake	Village	June 3, 1953	33
16	Fort Lauderdale	City	March 27, 1911	182,760
17	Lauderdale Lakes	City	June 22, 1961	35,954
18	Lauderhill	City	June 20, 1959	74,482
19	Sunrise	City	June 22, 1961	97,335
20	Plantation	City	April 30, 1953	91,750
21	Weston	City	September 3, 1996	68,107
22	Davie	Town	November 16, 1925	105,691
23	Dania Beach	City	November 30, 1904	31,723
24	Hollywood	City	November 28, 1925	153,067
25	Southwest Ranches	Town	June 6, 2000	7,607
26	Cooper City	City	June 20, 1959	34,401
27	Pembroke Pines	City	March 2, 1959	171,178
28	Miramar	City	May 26, 1955	134,721
29	West Park	City	March 1, 2005	15,130
30	Pembroke Park	Town	October 10, 1957	6,260
31	Hallandale Beach	City	May 11, 1927	41,217

=== Former unincorporated neighborhoods ===
In the 1980s, the Broward County Commission adopted a policy of having all populated places in the county be part of a municipality. Municipalities were often reluctant to annex neighborhoods which were not projected to yield enough tax revenue to cover the costs of providing services to those neighborhoods. In 2001, the Broward County Legislative Delegation adopted a policy encouraging the annexation of all unincorporated areas in Broward County into municipalities by October 1, 2005. Formerly unincorporated neighborhoods that have been annexed into existing municipalities, or combined to form new municipalities, as of 2018 include:

- Bonnie Loch-Woodsetter North in Deerfield Beach.
- Broadview-Pompano Park in North Lauderdale.
- Broward Estates in Lauderhill.
- Carver Ranches in West Park.
- Chambers Estates in Dania Beach.
- Chula Vista Isles in Fort Lauderdale.
- Collier Manor-Cresthaven in Pompano Beach.
- Country Estates in Southwest Ranches.
- Crystal Lake in Deerfield Beach.
- Edgewater in Dania Beach.
- Estates of Fort Lauderdale in Dania Beach, and partially in Hollywood.
- Godfrey Road in Parkland.
- Golden Heights in Fort Lauderdale.
- Green Meadow in Southwest Ranches.
- Hacienda Village in Davie.
- Ivanhoe Estates in Southwest Ranches.
- Kendall Green in Pompano Beach.
- Lake Forest in West Park.
- Leisureville in Pompano Beach.
- Loch Lomond in Pompano Beach.
- Melrose Park in Fort Lauderdale.
- Miami Gardens in West Park.
- North Andrews Gardens in Oakland Park.
- Oak Point in Hollywood.
- Palm Aire in Fort Lauderdale.
- Pine Island Ridge in Davie.
- Pompano Beach Highlands in Pompano Beach.
- Pompano Estates in Pompano Beach.
- Ramblewood East in Coral Springs.
- Ravenswood Estates in Dania Beach.
- Riverland Village in Fort Lauderdale.
- Rock Island in Fort Lauderdale.
- Rolling Oaks in Southwest Ranches.
- Royal Palm Ranches in Cooper City.
- St. George in Lauderhill.
- Sunshine Acres in Davie.
- Sunshine Ranches in Southwest Ranches.
- Tedder in Deerfield Beach.
- Terra Mar in Lauderdale-by-the-Sea, and partially in Pompano Beach.
- Twin Lakes North of Prospect Road, in Fort Lauderdale. South of Prospect Road, in Oakland Park.
- Utopia in West Park.
- Village Park in North Lauderdale.
- West Ken-Lark in Lauderhill.

=== Remaining unincorporated neighborhoods ===
By late in the first decade of the 21st century, annexation of remaining neighborhoods had stalled. As of 2018 the Broward County Municipal Services District serves seven unincorporated neighborhoods, including six census designated places (Boulevard Gardens, Broadview Park, Franklin Park, Hillsboro Pines, Roosevelt Gardens and Washington Park) and a parcel with a population of 72 in 2018, Hillsboro Ranches. Other areas in the developed part of the county that are not in municipalities include the Hollywood Seminole Indian Reservation, Fort Lauderdale-Hollywood International Airport, several landfills and resource recovery facilities, and other scattered small parcels with few or no residents.

== See also ==
- List of tallest buildings in Fort Lauderdale
- National Register of Historic Places listings in Broward County, Florida
- List of counties in Florida
