= Oak Point =

Oak Point may refer to the following places:

== Canada ==
- Oak Point, Manitoba, an unincorporated community and settlement
- Oak Point, a small community in Greenwich Parish, New Brunswick
- Oak Point, a community in the local service district of Oak Point-Bartibog Bridge, New Brunswick

== United States ==
- Oak Point (Hollywood) or Arapahoe, a neighborhood in Florida
- Oak Point, Texas, a suburban village
- Oak Point, Washington, an unincorporated community
- Oak Point Yard, a railroad yard in New York City

== Other uses ==
- Oak Point Link, a short railroad line in New York
- Oak Point Park and Nature Preserve, a park in Plano, Texas

== See also ==
- Pointe-du-Chêne, New Brunswick
- Pointe-au-Chêne, a neighbourhood of Grenville-sur-la-Rouge, Quebec
