= West Ken-Lark, Florida =

- neighborhood
- Interactive map of West Ken-Lark, Florida
- Coordinates: 26°8′44″N 80°11′29″W
- Country: United States
- State: Florida
- County: Broward

Area
  - Total: 0.50 sq mi (1.3 km^{2})
  - Land: 0.50 sq mi (1.3 km^{2})
  - Water: 0 sq mi (0.0 km^{2})

Population (2000)
  - Total: 3,412
  - Density: 7,025/sq mi (2,712.5/km^{2})
- Time zone: UTC-5 (Eastern (EST))
  - Summer (DST): UTC-4 (EDT)
- FIPS code: 12-76407

West Ken-Lark was a census-designated place (CDP) in Broward County, Florida, United States. The population was 3,412 at the 2000 census. It now serves as a neighborhood of Lauderhill.

== Geography ==
West Ken-Lark is located at 26°08′44″N 80°11′29″W.

According to the United States Census Bureau, the CDP has a total area of 1.3 km^{2} (0.50 sq mi), all land.

== Demographics ==
West Ken-Lark CDP, Florida – Racial and ethnic composition Note: the US Census treats Hispanic/Latino as an ethnic category. This table excludes Latinos from the racial categories and assigns them to a separate category. Hispanics/Latinos may be of any race.
Race / Ethnicity (NH = Non-Hispanic)	Pop 2000	2000
White alone (NH)	18	0.53%
Black or African American alone (NH)	3,295	96.57%
Native American or Alaska Native alone (NH)	3	0.09%
Asian alone (NH)	3	0.09%
Native Hawaiian or Pacific Islander alone (NH)	0	0.00%
Other race alone (NH)	6	0.18%
Mixed race or Multiracial (NH)	36	1.06%
Hispanic or Latino (any race)	51	1.49%
Total	3,412	100.00%

As of the census of 2000, there were 3,412 people, 995 households, and 826 families residing in the CDP. The population density was 2,688.5 people/km^{2} (6,963 people/mi^{2}). There were 1,022 housing units at an average density of 805.3 units/km^{2} (2,086 units/mi^{2}). The racial makeup of the CDP was 1.03% White, 97.33% African American, 0.12% Native American, 0.09% Asian, 0.26% from other races, and 1.17% from two or more races. Hispanic or Latino of any race were 1.49% of the population.

There were 995 households, out of which 33.0% had children under the age of 18 living with them, 36.9% were married couples living together, 40.6% had a female householder with no husband present, and 16.9% were non-families. 14.6% of all households were made up of individuals, and 5.7% had someone living alone who was 65 years of age or older. The average household size was 3.42 and the average family size was 3.74.

In the CDP, the population was spread out, with 33.5% under the age of 18, 9.3% from 18 to 24, 23.7% from 25 to 44, 21.7% from 45 to 64, and 11.7% who were 65 years of age or older. The median age was 32 years. For every 100 females, there were 85.1 males. For every 100 females age 18 and over, there were 76.3 males.

The median income for a household in the CDP was $29,568, and the median income for a family was $30,194. Males had a median income of $23,462 versus $21,637 for females. The per capita income for the CDP was $10,157. About 28.5% of families and 33.3% of the population were below the poverty line, including 51.9% of those under age 18 and 27.0% of those age 65 or over.

As of 2000, English as a first language accounted for 98.82% of all residents, while Spanish made up 0.60%, and French Creole was the mother tongue for 0.57% of the population.
