= Kendall Green, Pompano Beach, Florida =

Kendall Green, Florida
- neighborhood
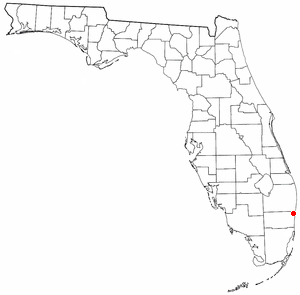
- Location of Kendall Green, Florida
- Coordinates: 26°16′2″N 80°7′13″W
- Country: United States
- State: Florida
- County: Broward

Area
  - Total: 0.46 sq mi (1.2 km^{2})
  - Land: 0.46 sq mi (1.2 km^{2})
  - Water: 0 sq mi (0.0 km^{2})
- Elevation: 20 ft (6 m)

Population (2000)
  - Total: 3,084
  - Density: 6,468/sq mi (2,497.2/km^{2})
- Time zone: UTC-5 (Eastern (EST))
  - Summer (DST): UTC-4 (EDT)
- FIPS code: 12-36112
- GNIS feature ID: 0300321

Kendall Green was a census-designated place (CDP) in Broward County, Florida, United States, and is now a neighborhood of Pompano Beach, Florida. The population was 3,084 at the 2000 census.

== Geography ==
Kendall Green is located at 26°16′2″N 80°7′13″W (26.267188, -80.120241).

According to the United States Census Bureau, the CDP has a total area of 1.2 km^{2} (0.46 sq mi), all land.

== Demographics ==
As of the census of 2000, there were 3,084 people, 931 households, and 683 families residing in the CDP. The population density was 2,480.7 people/km^{2} (6,425 people/mi^{2}). There were 982 housing units at an average density of 789.9 units/km^{2} (2,046 units/mi^{2}). The racial makeup of the CDP was 39.40% White (28.6% were Non-Hispanic White,) 41.28% African American, 0.23% Native American, 1.04% Asian, 0.06% Pacific Islander, 4.12% from other races, and 13.88% from two or more races. Hispanic or Latino of any race were 16.02% of the population.

There were 931 households, out of which 42.0% had children under the age of 18 living with them, 47.7% were married couples living together, 17.6% had a female householder with no husband present, and 26.6% were non-families. 18.0% of all households were made up of individuals, and 6.7% had someone living alone who was 65 years of age or older. The average household size was 3.31 and the average family size was 3.74.

In the CDP, the population was spread out, with 30.0% under the age of 18, 10.6% from 18 to 24, 32.5% from 25 to 44, 19.2% from 45 to 64, and 7.8% who were 65 years of age or older. The median age was 32 years. For every 100 females, there were 102.8 males. For every 100 females age 18 and over, there were 103.6 males.

The median income for a household in the CDP was $36,304, and the median income for a family was $35,260. Males had a median income of $25,239 versus $18,818 for females. The per capita income for the CDP was $12,621. About 20.4% of families and 22.7% of the population were below the poverty line, including 29.4% of those under age 18 and 6.5% of those age 65 or over.

As of 2000, English was a first language for 25.78% of all residents, while French Creole accounted for 50.22%, Spanish made up 24.26%, Portuguese was at 4.62%, and French was the mother tongue of 2.33% of the population.
