= Estates of Fort Lauderdale =

Estates of Fort Lauderdale, Florida
- neighborhood
- Interactive map of Estates of Fort Lauderdale, Florida
- Coordinates: 26°3′7″N 80°10′50″W
- Country: United States
- State: Florida
- County: Broward

Area
  - Total: 0.39 sq mi (1.0 km^{2})
  - Land: 0.31 sq mi (0.8 km^{2})
  - Water: 0.077 sq mi (0.2 km^{2})

Population (2000)
  - Total: 1,791
  - Density: 5,667/sq mi (2,188.1/km^{2})
- Time zone: UTC-5 (Eastern (EST))
  - Summer (DST): UTC-4 (EDT)
- FIPS code: 12-21137

Estates of Fort Lauderdale is a former census-designated place (CDP) in Broward County, Florida, United States. The population was 1,791 at the 2000 census. It now serves as a neighborhood that is split between Hollywood, Florida and Dania Beach, Florida. Contrary to its name, it is not part of Fort Lauderdale.

== Geography ==
Estates of Fort Lauderdale is located at 26°3′7″N 80°10′50″W (26.051866, -80.180653).

According to the United States Census Bureau, the CDP has a total area of 1.0 km^{2} (0.39 sq mi). 0.8 km^{2} (0.31 sq mi) of it is land and 0.2 km^{2} (0.077 sq mi) of it (22.50%) is water.

== Demographics ==
Estates of Fort Lauderdale first appeared as a census designated place in the 2000 U.S. census; the community was annexed to the cities of Dania Beach and Hollywood prior to the 2010 U.S. census.

=== 2000 census ===
As of the census of 2000, there were 1,791 people, 862 households, and 485 families residing in the CDP. The population density was 2,161.0 people/km^{2} (5,597 people/mi^{2}). There were 1,095 housing units at an average density of 1,321.2 units/km^{2} (3,422 units/mi^{2}). The racial makeup of the CDP was 89.34% White (80.6% were Non-Hispanic White,) 3.69% African American, 0.22% Native American, 1.62% Asian, 0.06% Pacific Islander, 2.12% from other races, and 2.96% from two or more races. Hispanic or Latino of any race were 11.84% of the population.

There were 862 households, out of which 15.4% had children under the age of 18 living with them, 43.0% were married couples living together, 10.1% had a female householder with no husband present, and 43.7% were non-families. 35.7% of all households were made up of individuals, and 20.1% had someone living alone who was 65 years of age or older. The average household size was 2.08 and the average family size was 2.69.

In the CDP, the population was spread out, with 14.9% under the age of 18, 5.5% from 18 to 24, 21.3% from 25 to 44, 24.4% from 45 to 64, and 33.9% who were 65 years of age or older. The median age was 51 years. For every 100 females, there were 80.0 males. For every 100 females age 18 and over, there were 74.9 males.

The median income for a household in the CDP was $31,276, and the median income for a family was $38,897. Males had a median income of $36,086 versus $30,769 for females. The per capita income for the CDP was $20,901. About 5.8% of families and 7.5% of the population were below the poverty line, including 4.2% of those under age 18 and 8.9% of those age 65 or over.

As of 2000, English as a first language accounted for 75.54% of all residents, while Spanish accounted for 10.21%, French made up 8.35%, Italian was at 4.02%, and Hebrew was the mother tongue of 1.85% of the population.
