= Chambers Estates, Dania Beach, Florida =

Chambers Estates, Florida
- neighborhood
- Interactive map of Chambers Estates, Florida
- Coordinates: 26°3′23″N 80°12′9″W
- Country: United States
- State: Florida
- County: Broward

Area
  - Total: 0.54 sq mi (1.4 km^{2})
  - Land: 0.54 sq mi (1.4 km^{2})
  - Water: 0 sq mi (0.0 km^{2})

Population (2000)
  - Total: 3,556
  - Density: 6,456/sq mi (2,492.6/km^{2})
- Time zone: UTC-5 (Eastern (EST))
  - Summer (DST): UTC-4 (EDT)
- FIPS code: 12-11557

Chambers Estates is a former census-designated place (CDP) in Broward County, Florida, United States. The population was 3,556 at the 2000 census. The community is now a part of Dania Beach, Florida.

== Geography ==
Chambers Estates is located at 26°3′23″N 80°12′9″W (26.056366, -80.202598).

According to the United States Census Bureau, the CDP has a total area of 1.4 km^{2} (0.54 sq mi), all land.

== Demographics ==
As of the census of 2000, there were 3,556 people, 1,336 households, and 883 families residing in the CDP. The population density was 2,496.3 people/km^{2} (6,465 people/mi^{2}). There were 1,432 housing units at an average density of 1,005.3 units/km^{2} (2,604 units/mi^{2}). The racial makeup of the CDP was 78.07% White (59.1% were Non-Hispanic White,) 11.08% African American, 0.28% Native American, 1.83% Asian, 5.40% from other races, and 3.35% from two or more races. Hispanic or Latino of any race were 25.90% of the population.

There were 1,336 households, out of which 36.6% had children under the age of 18 living with them, 40.5% were married couples living together, 18.2% had a female householder with no husband present, and 33.9% were non-families. 25.0% of all households were made up of individuals, and 7.9% had someone living alone who was 65 years of age or older. The average household size was 2.64 and the average family size was 3.16.

In the CDP, the population was spread out, with 27.8% under the age of 18, 9.4% from 18 to 24, 34.2% from 25 to 44, 20.1% from 45 to 64, and 8.6% who were 65 years of age or older. The median age was 34 years. For every 100 females, there were 95.0 males. For every 100 females age 18 and over, there were 91.9 males.

The median income for a household in the CDP was $37,756, and the median income for a family was $36,750. Males had a median income of $32,394 versus $23,958 for females. The per capita income for the CDP was $17,707. About 12.5% of families and 12.8% of the population were below the poverty line, including 14.5% of those under age 18 and 3.5% of those age 65 or over.

As of 2000, English as a first language accounted for 76.00% of all residents, while Spanish made up 22.81%, and French was the mother tongue of 1.17% of the population.
