= Sheridan Technical College and High School =

High school in Florida, United States

Coordinates: 26.1005°N 80.1976°W

Sheridan Technical College and Technical High School is a public post-secondary technical educational institution and a magnet school in Broward County, Florida. It has three campuses: Main Campus in Hollywood, West Campus in Pembroke Pines, and High School in Fort Lauderdale. The college offers over 40 technical programs.
