= Tedder, Florida =

- neighborhood
- Interactive map of Tedder, Florida
- Coordinates: 26°17′4″N 80°7′16″W
- Country: United States
- State: Florida
- County: Broward

Area
  - Total: 0.27 sq mi (0.7 km^{2})
  - Land: 0.27 sq mi (0.7 km^{2})
  - Water: 0 sq mi (0.0 km^{2})
- Elevation: 16 ft (5 m)

Population (2000)
  - Total: 2,079
  - Density: 7,466/sq mi (2,882.5/km^{2})
- Time zone: UTC-5 (Eastern (EST))
  - Summer (DST): UTC-4 (EDT)
- FIPS code: 12-71312
- GNIS feature ID: 1853291

Tedder is a neighborhood in Deerfield Beach, Florida, was a census-designated place (CDP) in Broward County, Florida, United States. The population was 2,079 at the 2000 census. The community was originally part of Pompano Beach.

== Geography ==
According to the United States Census Bureau, the CDP has a total area of 0.7 square kilometres (0.27 sq mi), all land.

== Demographics ==
As of the 2000 census, there were 2,079 people, 508 households, and 409 families residing in the CDP. The population density was 2,866.8 people/km^{2} (7,425 people/mi^{2}). There were 531 housing units at an average density of 732.2 units/km^{2} (1,896 units/mi^{2}). The racial makeup of the CDP was 30.79% White, 44.59% African American, 0.35% Native American, 1.49% Asian, 6.73% from other races, and 11.35% from two or more races. Hispanic or Latino of any race were 23.12% of the population.

There were 508 households, out of which 48.8% had children under the age of 18 living with them, 51.8% were married couples living together, 18.7% had a female householder with no husband present, and 19.3% were non-families. 11.8% of all households were made up of individuals, and 2.8% had someone living alone who was 65 years of age or older. The average household size was 3.88 and the average family size was 4.10.

In the CDP, the population was spread out, with 30.6% under the age of 18, 11.2% from 18 to 24, 28.0% from 25 to 44, 19.7% from 45 to 64, and 10.5% who were 65 years of age or older. The median age was 33 years. For every 100 females, there were 103.8 males. For every 100 females age 18 and over, there were 99.9 males.

The median income for a household in the CDP was $40,069, and the median income for a family was $37,330. Males had a median income of $24,053 versus $25,913 for females. The per capita income for the CDP was $11,737. About 13.9% of families and 18.2% of the population were below the poverty line, including 20.2% of those under age 18 and 10.2% of those age 65 or over.
