= Village Park, North Lauderdale, Florida =

Village Park, Florida
- neighborhood
- Interactive map of Village Park, Florida
- Coordinates: 26°11′36″N 80°12′9″W
- Country: United States
- State: Florida
- County: Broward

Area
  - Total: 0.19 sq mi (0.5 km^{2})
  - Land: 0.19 sq mi (0.5 km^{2})
  - Water: 0 sq mi (0.0 km^{2})

Population (2000)
  - Total: 895
  - Density: 5,030/sq mi (1,942.2/km^{2})
- Time zone: UTC-5 (Eastern (EST))
  - Summer (DST): UTC-4 (EDT)
- FIPS code: 12-74487

Village Park was a census-designated place (CDP) in Broward County, Florida, United States. The population was 895 at the 2000 census. It is now a part of North Lauderdale, Florida.

== Geography ==
Village Park is located at 26°11′36″N 80°12′9″W (26.193428, -80.202568).

According to the United States Census Bureau, the CDP has a total area of 0.5 km^{2} (0.19 sq mi). None of the area is covered with water.

== Demographics ==
As of the census of 2000, there were 895 people, 470 households, and 220 families residing in the CDP. The population density was 1,919.8 people/km^{2} (4,972 people/mi^{2}). There were 546 housing units at an average density of 1,171.2 units/km^{2} (3,033 units/mi^{2}). The racial makeup of the CDP was 82.23% White (70.7% were Non-Hispanic White,) 4.69% African American, 1.01% Native American, 3.80% Asian, 6.59% from other races, and 1.68% from two or more races. Hispanic or Latino of any race were 18.66% of the population.

There were 470 households, out of which 13.2% had children under the age of 18 living with them, 29.8% were married couples living together, 11.9% had a female householder with no husband present, and 53.0% were non-families. 39.8% of all households were made up of individuals, and 19.8% had someone living alone who was 65 years of age or older. The average household size was 1.90 and the average family size was 2.50.

In the CDP, the population was spread out, with 10.6% under the age of 18, 5.9% from 18 to 24, 27.9% from 25 to 44, 29.2% from 45 to 64, and 26.4% who were 65 years of age or older. The median age was 48 years. For every 100 females, there were 106.2 males. For every 100 females age 18 and over, there were 106.7 males.

The median income for a household in the CDP was $26,786, and the median income for a family was $27,321. Males had a median income of $19,669 versus $25,179 for females. The per capita income for the CDP was $20,623. About 20.5% of families and 16.4% of the population were below the poverty line, including 23.7% of those under age 18 and 8.8% of those age 65 or over.

As of 2000, English as a first language accounted for 79.67% of all residents, while Spanish accounted for 14.83%, and French was the mother tongue of 5.49% of the population.
