= Pompano Estates, Florida =

- neighborhood
- Interactive map of Pompano Estates, Florida
- Coordinates: 26°16′59″N 80°7′0″W
- Country: United States
- State: Florida
- County: Broward

Area
  - Total: 0.54 sq mi (1.4 km^{2})
  - Land: 0.54 sq mi (1.4 km^{2})
  - Water: 0 sq mi (0.0 km^{2})

Population (2000)
  - Total: 3,367
  - Density: 6,193/sq mi (2,391.1/km^{2})
- Time zone: UTC-5 (Eastern (EST))
  - Summer (DST): UTC-4 (EDT)
- FIPS code: 12-58087

Pompano Estates is a former census-designated place (CDP) in Broward County, Florida, United States. The population was 3,367 at the 2000 census. The area has since been incorporated into the city of Deerfield Beach.

== Geography ==
The Pompano Estates CDP was located at 26°16′59″N 80°7′0″W (26.283158, -80.116644).

According to the United States Census Bureau, the CDP had a total area of 1.4 km^{2} (0.54 sq mi), all land.

== Demographics ==
Pompano Estates CDP, Florida – Racial and ethnic composition Note: the US Census treats Hispanic/Latino as an ethnic category. This table excludes Latinos from the racial categories and assigns them to a separate category. Hispanics/Latinos may be of any race.
Race / Ethnicity (NH = Non-Hispanic)	Pop 2000	2000
White alone (NH)	906	26.91%
Black or African American alone (NH)	1,770	52.57%
Native American or Alaska Native alone (NH)	5	0.15%
Asian alone (NH)	11	0.33%
Native Hawaiian or Pacific Islander alone (NH)	1	0.03%
Other race alone (NH)	6	0.18%
Mixed race or Multiracial (NH)	310	9.21%
Hispanic or Latino (any race)	358	10.63%
Total	3,367	100.00%

As of the census of 2000, there were 3,367 people, 965 households, and 710 families residing in the CDP. The population density was 2,407.4 people/km^{2} (6,235 people/mi^{2}). There were 1,559 housing units at an average density of 1,114.7 units/km^{2} (2,887 units/mi^{2}). The racial makeup of the CDP was 34.69% White (26.9% were Non-Hispanic White,) 52.81% African American, 0.30% Native American, 0.36% Asian, 0.03% Pacific Islander, 2.41% from other races, and 9.41% from two or more races. Hispanic or Latino of any race were 10.63% of the population.

There were 965 households, out of which 39.7% had children under the age of 18 living with them, 43.7% were married couples living together, 22.0% had a female householder with no husband present, and 26.4% were non-families. 21.2% of all households were made up of individuals, and 8.3% had someone living alone who was 65 years of age or older. The average household size was 3.32 and the average family size was 3.86.

In the CDP, the population was spread out, with 32.8% under the age of 18, 9.5% from 18 to 24, 24.6% from 25 to 44, 18.6% from 45 to 64, and 14.5% who were 65 years of age or older. The median age was 32 years. For every 100 females, there were 94.2 males. For every 100 females age 18 and over, there were 94.1 males.

The median income for a household in the CDP was $28,750, and the median income for a family was $27,147. Males had a median income of $26,045 versus $16,939 for females. The per capita income for the CDP was $11,044. About 24.9% of families and 32.5% of the population were below the poverty line, including 47.7% of those under age 18 and 22.1% of those age 65 or over.

As of 2000, English as a first language accounted for 56.28% of all residents, while French Creole accounted for 29.36%, Spanish made up 9.29%, and French was a mother tongue for 5.05% of the population.
