= Godfrey Road, Florida =

- neighborhood
- Location of Godfrey Road
- Coordinates: 26°17′37″N 80°13′23″W
- Country: United States
- State: Florida
- County: Broward

Area
  - Total: 0.23 sq mi (0.6 km^{2})
  - Land: 0.23 sq mi (0.6 km^{2})
  - Water: 0 sq mi (0.0 km^{2})

Population (2000)
  - Total: 172
  - Density: 796/sq mi (307.2/km^{2})
- Time zone: UTC-5 (Eastern (EST))
  - Summer (DST): UTC-4 (EDT)
- FIPS code: 12-26237

Godfrey Road is a former census-designated place (CDP) in Broward County, Florida, United States. The population was 172 at the 2000 census. Godfrey Road was annexed by the city of Parkland, Florida in 2006.

== Geography ==
Godfrey Road is located at 26°17′37″N 80°13′23″W (26.293686, -80.223003).

According to the United States Census Bureau, the CDP has a total area of 0.6 km^{2} (0.23 sq mi), all land.

== Demographics ==
As of the census of 2000, there were 172 people, 55 households, and 49 families residing in the CDP. The population density was 301.9 people/km^{2} (782 people/mi^{2}). There were 55 housing units at an average density of 96.5 units/km^{2} (250 units/mi^{2}). The racial makeup of the CDP was 85.47% White (84.3% were Non-Hispanic White,) 0.58% African American, 0.58% Native American, 9.30% from other races, and 4.07% from two or more races. Hispanic or Latino of any race were 7.56% of the population.

There were 55 households, out of which 29.1% had children under the age of 18 living with them, 85.5% were married couples living together, 3.6% had a female householder with no husband present, and 9.1% were non-families. 7.3% of all households were made up of individuals, and 1.8% had someone living alone who was 65 years of age or older. The average household size was 3.04 and the average family size was 3.12.

In the CDP, the population was spread out, with 22.7% under the age of 18, 8.1% from 18 to 24, 19.8% from 25 to 44, 37.2% from 45 to 64, and 12.2% who were 65 years of age or older. The median age was 45 years. For every 100 females, there were 95.5 males. For every 100 females age 18 and over, there were 101.5 males.

The median income for a household in the CDP was $80,966, and the median income for a family was $83,163. Males had a median income of $30,536 versus $27,386 for females. The per capita income for the CDP was $22,319. None of the population or families were below the poverty line.

As of 2000, English accounted for 84.00% of all residents, while Spanish was the mother tongue of 16.00% of the population.
