= Hillsboro Ranches, Florida =

- neighborhood
- Interactive map of Hillsboro Ranches, Florida
- Coordinates: 26°19′11″N 80°10′49″W
- Country: United States
- State: Florida
- County: Broward

Area
  - Total: 0.12 sq mi (0.3 km^{2})
  - Land: 0.12 sq mi (0.3 km^{2})
  - Water: 0 sq mi (0.0 km^{2})

Population (2000)
  - Total: 47
  - Density: 472/sq mi (182.1/km^{2})
- Time zone: UTC-5 (Eastern (EST))
  - Summer (DST): UTC-4 (EDT)
- FIPS code: 12-30866

Hillsboro Ranches was a census-designated place (CDP) in Broward County, Florida, United States in 2000. The population was 47 at the 2000 census. Hillsboro Ranches was not designated a CDP in the 2010 census. As of 2018, Hillsboro Ranches remains an unincorporated neighborhood, part of the Broward Municipal Services District, Northern County.

== Geography ==
The Hillsboro Ranches CDP was located at 26°19′11″N 80°10′49″W (26.319853, -80.180336).

According to the United States Census Bureau, the CDP had a total area of 0.3 km^{2} (0.12 sq mi), all land.

== Demographics ==
As of the census of 2000, there were 47 people, 16 households, and 12 families residing in the CDP. The population density was 181.5 people/km^{2} (470 people/mi^{2}). There were 19 housing units at an average density of 73.4 units/km^{2} (190 units/mi^{2}). The racial makeup of the CDP was 97.87% White and 2.13% Native American.

There were 16 households, out of which 50.0% had children under the age of 18 living with them, 68.8% were married couples living together, and 25.0% were non-families. 18.8% of all households were made up of individuals, and 12.5% had someone living alone who was 65 years of age or older. The average household size was 2.94 and the average family size was 3.33.

In the CDP, the population was spread out, with 29.8% under the age of 18, 2.1% from 18 to 24, 31.9% from 25 to 44, 23.4% from 45 to 64, and 12.8% who were 65 years of age or older. The median age was 37 years. For every 100 females, there were 88.0 males. For every 100 females age 18 and over, there were 106.3 males.

The median income for a household in the CDP was $26,250, and the median income for a family was $0. Males had a median income of $0 versus $0 for females. The per capita income for the CDP was $27,060. None of the population and none of the families were below the poverty line.

In 2018, the neighborhood had 72 residents.
