= Terra Mar, Florida =

- neighborhood
- Interactive map of Terra Mar, Florida
- Coordinates: 26°12′45″N 80°5′44″W
- Country: United States
- State: Florida
- County: Broward

Area
  - Total: 0.39 sq mi (1.0 km^{2})
  - Land: 0.39 sq mi (1.0 km^{2})
  - Water: 0 sq mi (0.0 km^{2})
- Elevation: 3.3 ft (1 m)

Population (2000)
  - Total: 2,631
  - Density: 7,054/sq mi (2,723.7/km^{2})
- Time zone: UTC-5 (Eastern (EST))
  - Summer (DST): UTC-4 (EDT)
- FIPS code: 12-71558
- GNIS feature ID: 0292133

Terra Mar was a census-designated place (CDP) in Broward County, Florida, United States. The population was 2,631 at the 2000 census. Most of the neighborhood belongs to Lauderdale-by-the-Sea, Florida with a small portion belonging to Pompano Beach, Florida.

== Geography ==
Terra Mar is located at 26°12′45″N 80°5′44″W (26.212493, -80.095452).

According to the United States Census Bureau, the CDP has a total area of 1.0 km^{2} (0.39 sq mi), all land.

== Demographics ==
As of the census of 2000, there were 2,631 people, 1,570 households, and 766 families residing in the CDP. The population density was 2,745.5 people/km^{2} (7,111 people/mi^{2}). There were 2,712 housing units at an average density of 2,830.0 units/km^{2} (7,330 units/mi^{2}). The racial makeup of the CDP was 97.87% White (93.5% were Non-Hispanic White,) 0.57% African American, 0.19% Asian, 0.57% from other races, and 0.80% from two or more races. Hispanic or Latino of any race were 5.06% of the population.

There were 1,570 households, out of which 5.3% had children under the age of 18 living with them, 42.8% were married couples living together, 4.1% had a female householder with no husband present, and 51.2% were non-families. 44.6% of all households were made up of individuals, and 22.5% had someone living alone who was 65 years of age or older. The average household size was 1.68 and the average family size was 2.23.

In the CDP, the population was spread out, with 5.0% under the age of 18, 1.7% from 18 to 24, 17.3% from 25 to 44, 31.6% from 45 to 64, and 44.4% who were 65 years of age or older. The median age was 62 years. For every 100 females, there were 90.1 males. For every 100 females age 18 and over, there were 89.3 males.

The median income for a household in the CDP was $50,394, and the median income for a family was $63,625. Males had a median income of $57,171 versus $35,625 for females. The per capita income for the CDP was $40,923. About 3.6% of families and 8.2% of the population were below the poverty line, including 15.0% of those under age 18 and 7.2% of those age 65 or over.

As of 2000, English as a first language accounted for 80.88% of all residents, while both French and Spanish made up 5.83%, Italian 3.42%, German was at 3.21%, and Arabic was the mother tongue of 0.80% of the population.
