= Festival Flea Market Mall =

Defunct flea market mall in Pompano Beach, Florida, U.S

Coordinates: 26°16′20.3838″N 80°9′46.5228″W

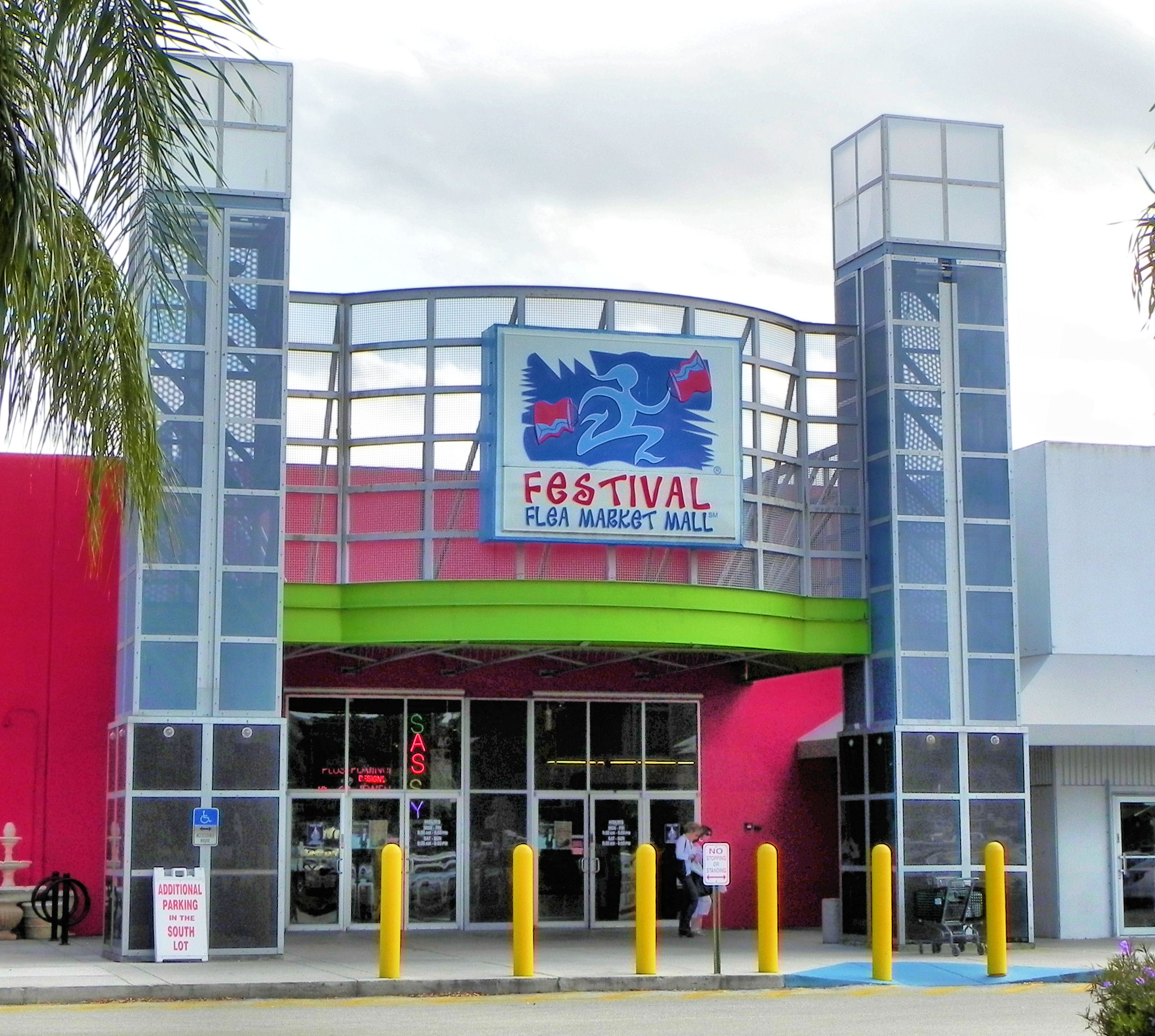
- The main entrance of the Festival Flea Market Mall
- Location: Pompano Beach, Florida, U.S.
- Opened: 1986; 40 years ago (as Pompano Outlet Mall); Late 1991; 35 years ago (as Flea Market)
- Closed: June 1, 2025; 17 months ago
- Demolished: Early January 2026 (currently in progress)
- Manager: Foundry Commercial
- Owner: Foundry Commercial

Festival Flea Market Mall was an indoor flea market mall located in Pompano Beach, Florida, United States. The former flea market used to be a Pompano outlet mall prior to its transformation into a flea market. Festival Flea Market Mall was established in 1991 and incorporated in Florida. Estimates show the mall employed a staff of approximately 50 to 99 employees.

The mall opened as Pompano Outlet Mall in 1986 and permanently closed in 2025 as Flea Market Mall, and was put into foreclosure only two years after it opened. By 1989, the original outlet mall had closed entirely save for a movie theater. After a failed attempt to reopen it in 1990 under the name Broward Crossing, it was purchased by Shooster Properties and reopened in 1991 as a flea market mall.

Festival Flea Market Mall was located at 2900 West Sample Road, two miles west of I-95 at the Florida Turnpike. The mall itself was over a quarter-mile long and featured over 800 stores with name brand merchandise at below outlet prices Festival receives visitors from all over the world and is housed in a 400,000 sq. ft. building that features booths and kiosks that sell designer jewelry, electronics, clothes, and shoes.

The mall was acquired by Foundry Commercial in September 2025. It is currently being demolished and being replaced by Festival Logistics Park.

== Location ==
Festival Flea Market Mall was located in Pompano Beach, Florida on Sample Road at the Florida Turnpike, Exit 69. It is located approximately 15 minutes from Fort Lauderdale and 30 minutes from Miami.

== Merchants ==
Festival Flea Market Mall included over 500 retailers and merchants, operating booths (beginning at 144 sq. ft.), boutiques (up to 1,200 sq. ft.), specialty stores (1,200 - 2,000 sq. ft.), large stores (2,000+ sq.ft.), kiosks, pushcarts, and food court restaurants. The Festival Flea Market Mall has an open, multi-merchant flea market style layout. The large number of merchants offer a wide variety of products extending beyond typical flea market fare to include groceries, furniture, antiques and luggage.

== See also ==
- Broward County, Florida
- List of largest shopping malls
- List of largest shopping malls in the United States
