= Riverwalk (Fort Lauderdale) =

Waterfront area in Florida, United States

Coordinates: 26.1191°N 80.1454°W

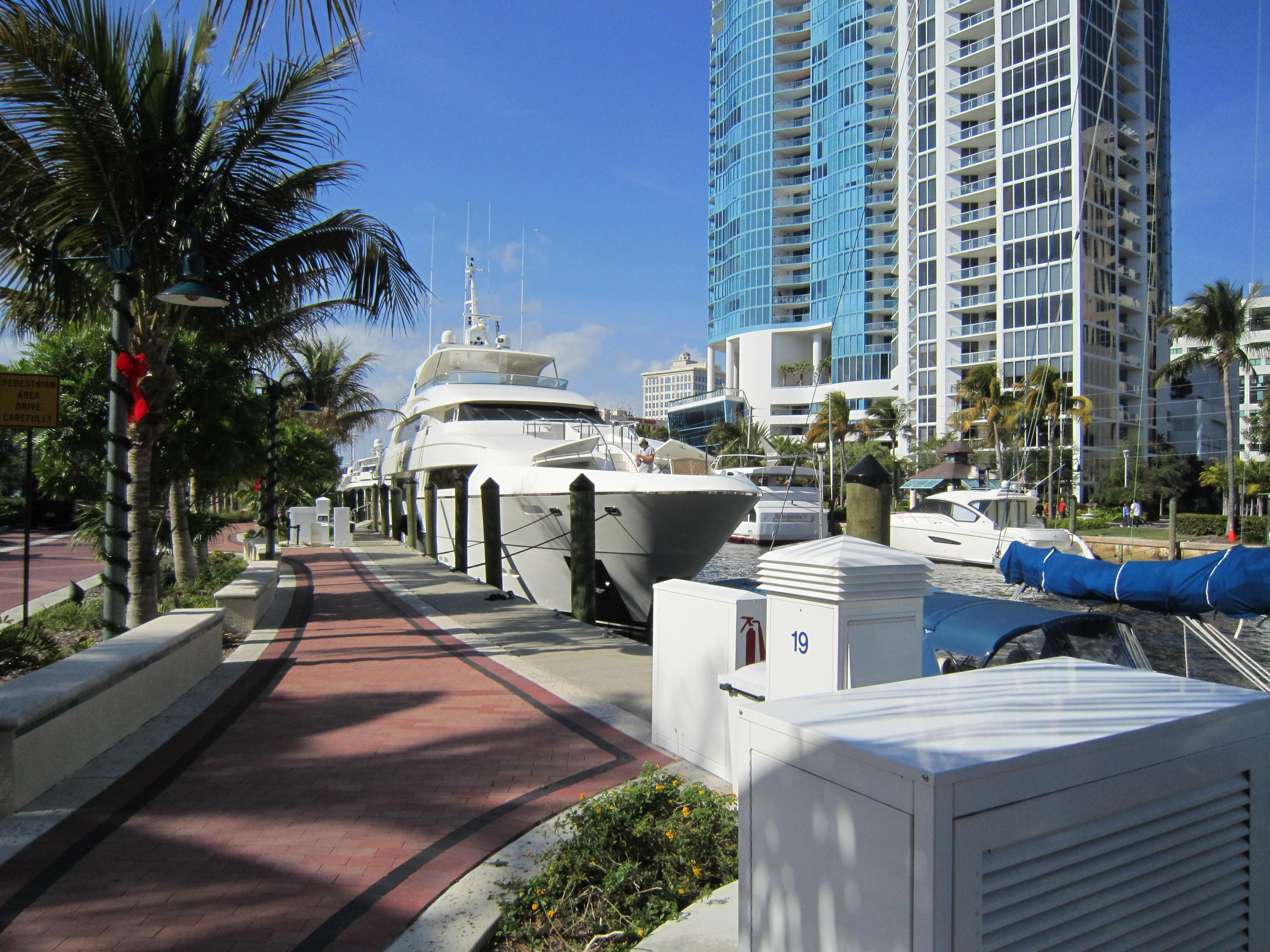
Along RiverWalk, New River, Fort Lauderdale, Florida

Riverwalk, also known as the Fort Lauderdale Riverwalk, is a riverwalk along New River in Fort Lauderdale, Florida. Its length is over a mile and goes from the Sailboat Bend neighborhood to near the Stranahan House. It is in the former club district in downtown Fort Lauderdale. There are two main streets that run through the district, Las Olas Boulevard and Himmarshee Street.

The riverwalk was first proposed in 1926. After a 1986 bond issue, it started being developed and the first section was completed in 1990.

Other nearby landmarks includes the Museum of Science & Discovery. There is also a park that runs along with waterfront that is home to many festivals and events.
