= Young at Art Museum =

Interactive art museum in Florida

Coordinates: 26°06′45″N 80°18′40″W

Young At Art Museum
- Logo of Young at Art

- Location within Florida
- Established: 1987
- Location: Plantation, Florida
- Type: Children's museum
- Visitors: 50,000 annually
- CEO: Traci Leon
- Website: www.youngatartmuseum.org

Young At Art Museum (YAA) is an interactive art museum in Plantation, Florida, founded in 1987 by Esther and Mindy Shrago. For two years, Young At Art traveled South Florida as a Museum Without Walls. In 1989, it opened a 3,200 sq. ft. storefront in Plantation. Young At Art relocated to a 24,000 sq. ft. leased space in Davie in 1998.

With federal, state, county, town and community support – and through a public/private partnership with Broward County – Young At Art opened a new 55,000 sq. ft. Gold LEED museum and public library on May 5, 2012. The Knight Foundation named the new building as "one of the most transformative arts initiatives in South Florida".

In September 2020, Broward County concluded Young At Art’s lease as part of a transition period for the organization, allowing YAA to re-envision its future and continue serving the community in new ways. The museum reopened at the Broward mall in March 2021.
