= Oak Point (Hollywood) =

Oak Point, Florida
- neighborhood
- Interactive map of Oak Point, Florida
- Coordinates: 26°2′56″N 80°11′22″W
- Country: United States
- State: Florida
- County: Broward

Area
  - Total: 0.039 sq mi (0.1 km^{2})
  - Land: 0.039 sq mi (0.1 km^{2})
  - Water: 0 sq mi (0.0 km^{2})

Population (2000)
  - Total: 145
  - Density: 3,573/sq mi (1,379.5/km^{2})
- Time zone: UTC-5 (Eastern (EST))
  - Summer (DST): UTC-4 (EDT)
- FIPS code: 12-50636

Oak Point was a census-designated place (CDP) in Broward County, Florida, United States. The population was 145 at the 2000 census. It now serves as a Hollywood, Florida neighborhood known for its wealthy residents and beautiful large homes. It is more commonly referred to as Arapahoe.

== Geography ==
Oak Point is located at 26°2′56″N 80°11′22″W (26.048966, -80.189445).

According to the United States Census Bureau, the CDP has a total area of 0.1 km^{2} (0.039 sq mi), all land. However, there is a small lake with a fountain within the neighborhood.

== Demographics ==
As of the census of 2000, there were 145 people, 48 households, and 45 families residing in the CDP. The population density was 1,399.6 people/km^{2} (3,625 people/mi^{2}). There were 50 housing units at an average density of 482.6 units/km^{2} (1,250 units/mi^{2}). The racial makeup of the CDP was 94.48% White (93.8% were Non-Hispanic White,) 5.52% from other races. Hispanic or Latino of any race were 1.38% of the population.

There were 48 households, which 39.6% had children under the age of 18 living with them, 83.3% were married couples living together, 6.3% had a female householder with no husband present, and 6.3% were non-families. 4.2% of all households were made up of individuals, and 2.1% had someone living alone who was 65 years of age or older. The average household size was 3.02 and the average family size was 3.13.

The CDP's population was distributed with 26.2% under the age of 18, 8.3% from 18 to 24, 8.3% from 25 to 44, 50.3% from 45 to 64, and 6.9% who were 65 years of age or older. The median age was 49 years. For every 100 females, there were 93.3 males. For every 100 females age 18 and over, there were 101.9 males.

The median income for a household in the CDP was $156,259, and the median income for a family was $199,450. Males had a median income of $105,722 versus $64,250 for females. The per capita income for the CDP was $86,225. None of the population and none of the families were below the poverty line.

As of 2000, 100% of the population spoke English as their first language.
