= List of census-designated places in Florida =

Map of the United States with Florida highlighted

The United States Census Bureau defines certain unincorporated communities (lacking elected municipal officers and boundaries with legal status) as census-designated places (CDPs) for enumeration in each decennial census. The Census Bureau defined 485 Florida CDPs for the 2000 census and 509 CDPs for the 2010 census. As of the 2020 census, there were 41 new CDPs added and 3 CDPs removed/merged into others for a total of 547.

== Current census-designated places ==
CDP	County	Location of County	Population (2020)	Population (2010)	Population (2000)	Population (1990)	Population (1980)	Notes
Acacia Villas	Palm Beach		398	427	x	x	x	
Alafaya	Orange		92,452	78,113	x	x	x	
Allentown	Santa Rosa		1,023	894	x	x	x	
Altoona	Lake		98					
Alturas	Polk		4,084	4,185	x	x	x	
Alva	Lee		2,725					
Andrews	Levy		837					
Apollo Beach	Hillsborough		26,002					
Aripeka	Pasco & Hernando		320	308	x	x	x	
Asbury Lake	Clay		11,036					
Astor	Lake		1,759					
Aucilla	Jefferson		103	100	x	x	x	
Avalon	Santa Rosa		722	679	x	x	x	
Ave Maria	Collier		6,242	x	x	x	x	
Azalea Park	Orange		14,141					
Babson Park	Polk		1,330					
Bagdad	Santa Rosa		4,467					
Balm	Hillsborough		6,541	1,457	x	x	x	
Bardmoor	Pinellas		9,852	9,732	x	x	x	
Bay Hill	Orange		5,021					
Bayonet Point	Pasco		26,713					
Bay Pines	Pinellas		3,106					
Bayport	Hernando		45					
Bayshore Gardens	Manatee		19,904					
Beacon Square	Pasco		8,320					
Bear Creek	Pinellas		1,906	1,948	x	x	x	
Bee Ridge	Sarasota		9,955	9,598	8,744			
Bellair-Meadowbrook Terrace	Clay		14,482					
Bellview	Escambia		25,541					
Berkshire Lakes	Collier		2,527	x	x	x	x	
Berrydale	Santa Rosa		348	441	x	x	x	
Beverly Hills	Citrus		9,961					
Big Coppitt Key	Monroe		2,869					
Big Pine Key	Monroe		4,521					
Bithlo	Orange		9,848					
Black Diamond	Citrus		1,255					
Black Hammock	Seminole		1,080	1,144	x	x	x	
Bloomingdale	Hillsborough		22,947					
Bokeelia	Lee		1,855					
Boulevard Gardens	Broward		1,457	1,274	1,415	x	x	
Bradfordville	Leon		19,183	x	x	x	x	
Bradley Junction	Polk		542	686	x	x	x	
Brandon	Hillsborough		114,626					
Brent	Escambia		23,447					
Broadview Park	Broward		7,670					
Brookridge	Hernando		4,658					
Brownsdale	Santa Rosa		528	471	x	x	x	
Brownsville	Miami-Dade		16,583					
Buckhead Ridge	Glades		1,509					
Buckingham	Lee		4,443					
Buenaventura Lakes	Osceola		30,251	26,079	21,778	14,148	x	First appeared as a CDP in the 1990 U.S. census under the name Buena Ventura Lakes; and then was incorrectly lised as Yeehaw Junction in the 2000 U.S. Census. Name was restored was Buenaventura Lakes in the 2010 U.S. census.
Burnt Store Marina	Lee		1,890					
Butler Beach	St. Johns		4,978					
Cabana Colony	Palm Beach		2,460					
Campbell	Osceola		2,610					
Canal Point	Palm Beach		344					
Capitola	Leon		247	x	x	x	x	
Captiva	Lee		318					
Carrollwood	Hillsborough		34,352					
Cedar Grove	Bay		3,148	3,397	x	x	x	Formed from part of disincorporated Cedar Grove town and part of deleted Hiland Park CDP
Celebration	Osceola		11,178					
Chaires	Leon		308	x	x	x	x	
Charleston Park	Lee		235					
Charlotte Harbor	Charlotte		3,784					
Charlotte Park	Charlotte		2,667					
Cheval	Hillsborough		12,522					
Chokoloskee	Collier		346					
Christmas	Orange		2,439					
Chuluota	Seminole		2,524					
Chumuckla	Santa Rosa		1,063					
Citrus Hills	Citrus		9,302					
Citrus Park	Hillsborough		28,178					
Citrus Springs	Citrus		10,246					
Clarcona	Orange		3,283					
Cleveland	Charlotte		3,435					
Cobbtown	Santa Rosa		78					
Cocoa West	Brevard		5,939					
Combee Settlement	Polk		5,911					
Connerton	Pasco		5,282					
Conway	Orange		13,596					
Coral Terrace	Miami-Dade		23,142					
Cortez	Manatee		4,121					
Country Club	Miami-Dade		49,967					
Country Walk	Miami-Dade		16,951					
Crawfordville	Wakulla		4,853					
Crescent Beach	St. Johns		844					
Crooked Lake Park	Polk		1,893					
Crystal Lake	Polk		6,211					
Crystal Springs	Pasco		1,268					
Cudjoe Key	Monroe		2,019					
Cypress Gardens	Polk		10,040					
Cypress Lake	Lee		13,727					
Cypress Quarters	Okeechobee		1,029					
Dade City North	Pasco		3,002					
Day	Lafayette		89					
DeLand Southwest	Volusia		1,056					
De Leon Springs	Volusia		2,619					
Desoto Acres	Sarasota		720	x	x	x	x	
Desoto Lakes	Sarasota		2,137					
Dickerson City	Santa Rosa		160					
Dixonville	Santa Rosa		195					
Doctor Phillips	Orange		12,328					
Dover	Hillsborough		3,266					
Duck Key	Monroe		761					
East Bronson	Levy		2,025					
East Lake	Pinellas		32,344					
East Lake-Orient Park	Hillsborough		28,050					
East Milton	Santa Rosa		14,309					
East Palatka	Putnam		1,573					
East Williston	Levy		780					
Eastpoint	Franklin		2,614					
Eglin AFB	Okaloosa		3,006					
Egypt Lake-Leto	Hillsborough		36,644					
Elfers	Pasco		14,573					
Ellenton	Manatee		4,129					
Englewood	Charlotte • Sarasota		20,800					
Ensley	Escambia		23,817					
Fairview Shores	Orange		10,722					
Feather Sound	Pinellas		3,607					
Ferndale	Lake		548					
Fern Park	Seminole		8,205					
Ferry Pass	Escambia		29,921					
Fidelis	Santa Rosa		137					
Fisher Island	Miami-Dade		561					
Fish Hawk	Hillsborough		24,625					
Five Points	Columbia		1,076					
Flagler Estates	St. Johns		3,540					
Fleming Island	Clay		29,142		x	x	x	
Floral City	Citrus		5,261					
Florida Gulf Coast University	Lee		3,659	x	x	x	x	
Florida Ridge	Indian River		21,302					
Floridatown	Santa Rosa		319					
Forest City	Seminole		14,623					
Fort Braden	Leon		1,045	x	x	x	x	
Fort Denaud	Hendry		2,049					
Fort Green	Hardee		78					
Fort Green Springs	Hardee		190					
Fort Myers Shores	Lee		5,774					
Fort Pierce North	St. Lucie		6,904					
Fort Pierce South	St. Lucie		5,209					
Fontainebleau	Miami-Dade		59,870					
Four Corners	Lake • Orange • Polk • Osceola		56,381	26,116	12,015	x	x	As Citrus Ridge in the 2000 U.S. census
Franklin Park	Broward		1,025					
Fruit Cove	St. Johns		32,143					
Fruitville	Sarasota		15,484					
Fuller Heights	Polk		10,467					
Fussels Corner	Polk		5,560					
Garcon Point	Santa Rosa		457					
Garden Grove	Hernando		776					
Gardner	Hardee		364					
Gateway	Lee		10,376					
Geneva	Seminole		2,913					
Gibsonton	Hillsborough		18,566					
Gifford	Indian River		5,511					
Gladeview	Miami-Dade		14,927					
Glencoe	Volusia		2,170					
Glenvar Heights	Miami-Dade		20,786					
Golden Gate	Collier		25,321					
Golden Glades	Miami-Dade		32,499					
Goldenrod	Orange & Seminole		13,431					
Gonzalez	Escambia		14,586					
Goodland	Collier		312					
Gotha	Orange		2,217					
Goulding	Escambia		3,392					
Goulds	Miami-Dade		11,446					
Greenbriar	Pinellas		2,696					
Grenelefe	Polk		2,495					
Grove City	Charlotte		2,174					
Gulf Gate	Sarasota		11,118	x	x	x	x	
Gun Club Estates	Palm Beach		816					
Harbor Bluffs	Pinellas		2,646					
Harbour Heights	Charlotte		3,428					
Harlem	Hendry		2,397					
Harlem Heights	Lee		1,930					
Harold	Santa Rosa		909					
Hastings	St. Johns		1,262					
Heathrow	Seminole		6,806					
Heritage Bay	Collier		966	x	x	x	x	
Heritage Pines	Pasco		1,783					
Hernando	Citrus		9,284					
Hernando Beach	Hernando		2,506					
Highland City	Polk		11,392					
High Point	Hernando		3,873					
Hill 'n Dale	Hernando		2,212					
Hillsboro Pines	Broward		496					
Hobe Sound	Martin		13,163					
Holden Heights	Orange		4,097					
Holden Lakes	Orange		3,591					
Holiday	Pasco		24,939					
Holley	Santa Rosa		2,484					
Homeland	Polk		305					
Homestead Base	Miami-Dade		999					
Homosassa	Citrus		2,299					
Homosassa Springs	Citrus		14,283					
Horizon West	Orange		58,101					
Hosford	Liberty		629					
Hudson	Pasco		12,944					
Hunters Creek	Orange		24,433					
Hurlburt Field	Okaloosa		2,176	x	x	x	x	
Hutchinson Island South	St. Lucie		4,988					
Immokalee	Collier		24,557					
Indian Lake Estates	Polk		634	x	x	x	x	
Indian River Estates	St. Lucie		6,584					
Inverness Highlands North	Citrus		2,707					
Inverness Highlands South	Citrus		6,698					
Inwood	Polk		7,031					
Iona	Lee		16,908					
Island Walk	Collier		2,812		x	x	x	
Istachatta	Hernando		126					
Ives Estates	Miami-Dade		25,005					
Jan Phyl Village	Polk		5,927					
Jasmine Estates	Pasco		21,525					
Jensen Beach	Martin		12,652					
June Park	Brevard		4,283					
Juno Ridge	Palm Beach		1,186					
Jupiter Farms	Palm Beach		13,045					
Kathleen	Polk		6,486					
Kendale Lakes	Miami-Dade		55,646					
Kendall	Miami-Dade		80,241					
Kendall West	Miami-Dade		36,536					
Kensington Park	Sarasota		3,697					
Kenwood Estates	Palm Beach		1,435					
Key Largo	Monroe		12,447					
Keystone	Hillsborough		25,211					
Key Vista	Pasco		1,757					
Lacoochee	Pasco		1,124					
Laguna Beach	Bay		4,330					
Lake Belvedere Estates	Palm Beach		2,091					
Lake Butler	Orange		15,400					
Lake Harbor	Palm Beach		49					
Lake Hart	Orange		1,052					
Lake Kathryn	Lake		990					
Lake Kerr	Marion		1,843	x	x	x	x	
Lake Lindsey	Hernando		90					
Lake Lorraine	Okaloosa		7,142					
Lake Mack-Forest Hills	Lake		992					
Lake Magdalene	Hillsborough		30,742					
Lake Mary Jane	Orange		1,790					
Lake Mystic	Liberty		500					
Lake Panasoffkee	Sumter		4,072					
Lake Sarasota	Sarasota		3,979					
Lakeland Highlands	Polk		12,187					
Lakeside	Clay		31,275					
Lakewood Park	St. Lucie		12,510					
Lakewood Ranch	Manatee • Sarasota		34,877		x	x	x	x
Lamont	Jefferson		170					
Land o' Lakes	Pasco		35,929					
Laurel	Sarasota		12,186					
Lealman	Pinellas		21,189					
Lecanto	Citrus		6,301					
Lehigh Acres	Lee		114,287					
Leisure City	Miami-Dade		26,324					
Lely	Collier		3,694					
Lely Resort	Collier		7,619					
Lemon Grove	Hardee		637					
Liberty Triangle	Marion		23,759	x	x	x	x	
Limestone	Hardee		157					
Limestone Creek	Palm Beach		1,316					
Lisbon	Lake		229					
Lloyd	Jefferson		187					
Lochmoor Waterway Estates	Lee		5,828					
Lockhart	Orange		14,058					
Loughman	Polk		5,417					
Lower Grand Lagoon	Bay		4,398					
Lutz	Hillsborough		23,707					
Manasota Key	Charlotte		1,326					
Manatee Road	Levy		2,484					
Mango	Hillsborough		12,699					
Marco Shores-Hammock Bay	Collier		957	x	x	x	x	
Marion Oaks	Marion		19,034	x	x	x	x	
Masaryktown	Hernando		1,077					
Matlacha	Lee		598					
Matlacha Isles-Matlacha Shores	Lee		227					
McGregor	Lee		7,976					
Meadow Oaks	Pasco		2,842					
Meadow Woods	Orange		43,790					
Medulla	Polk		10,871					
Memphis	Manatee		9,024					
Merritt Island	Brevard		34,518					
Micco	Brevard		9,574					
Miccosukee	Leon		383	x	x	x	x	
Middleburg	Clay		12,881					
Midway	Santa Rosa		19,567					
Midway	Seminole		1,714					
Mims	Brevard		7,336					
Miramar Beach	Walton		8,002					
Molino	Escambia		1,296					
Montura	Hendry		3,355					
Moon Lake	Pasco		4,458					
Morriston	Levy		165					
Mount Carmel	Santa Rosa		243					
Mount Plymouth	Lake		4,417					
Mulat	Santa Rosa		322					
Munson	Santa Rosa		326					
Myrtle Grove	Escambia		17,224					
Naples Manor	Collier		5,132					
Naples Park	Collier		5,092					
Naranja	Miami-Dade		13,509					
Nassau Village-Ratliff	Nassau		5,561					
Navarre	Santa Rosa		40,817					
Navarre Beach	Santa Rosa		1,123					
New Port Richey East	Pasco		11,015					
Nobleton	Hernando		232					
Nocatee	St. Johns		22,503					
Nokomis	Sarasota		3,217					
North Brooksville	Hernando		3,506					
North DeLand	Volusia		1,510					
North Fort Myers	Lee		42,719					
North Key Largo	Monroe		1,431					
North Merritt Island	Brevard		8,566	x	x	x	x	
North River Shores	Martin		3,459					
North Sarasota	Sarasota		2,418					
North Weeki Wachee	Hernando		9,131					
Northdale	Hillsborough		23,033					
Oakleaf Plantation	Clay		31,034		x	x	x	
Oak Ridge	Orange		25,062					
Ocala Estates	Marion		2,991	x	x	x	x	
Ocean City	Okaloosa		6,314					
Ocklawaha	Marion		1,508	x	x	x	x	
Odessa	Pasco		8,080					
Ojus	Miami-Dade		19,673					
Okahumpka	Lake		240					
Old Miakka	Sarasota		1,743	x	x	x	x	
Olga	Lee		2,270					
Olympia Heights	Miami-Dade		12,873					
On Top of the World	Marion		12,668	x	x	x	x	
Ona	Hardee		199					
Orangetree	Collier		5,896					
Oriole Beach	Santa Rosa		1,679					
Orlovista	Orange		6,806					
Ormond-by-the-Sea	Volusia		7,312					
Osprey	Sarasota		6,690					
Pace	Santa Rosa		24,684					
Page Park	Lee		747					
Paisley	Lake		980					
Palm City	Martin		25,883					
Palm Harbor	Pinellas		61,366					
Palm River-Clair Mel	Hillsborough		26,142					
Palm Springs North	Miami-Dade		5,030					
Palm Valley	St. Johns		21,827					
Palmer Ranch	Sarasota		14,966	x	x	x	x	
Palmetto Estates	Miami-Dade		13,498					
Palmona Park	Lee		1,240					
Panacea	Wakulla		735					
Paradise Heights	Orange		1,260					
Pasadena Hills	Pasco		7,570					
Patrick SFB	Brevard		1,642		x	x	x	Originally Patrick AFB; name changed to Patrick SFB After the 2020 U.S. census
Pea Ridge	Santa Rosa		3,787					
Pebble Creek	Hillsborough		9,624					
Pelican Bay	Collier		6,660	x	x	x	x	
Pelican Marsh	Collier		2,453					
Pensacola Station	Escambia		5,532	x	x	x	x	
Pine Air	Palm Beach		2,190					
Pine Castle	Orange		11,122					
Pine Hills	Orange		66,111					
Pine Island	Hernando		62					
Pine Island Center	Lee		1,942					
Pine Lakes	Lake		818					
Pine Level	Santa Rosa		253					
Pine Manor	Lee		4,122					
Pine Ridge	Citrus		11,042					
Pine Ridge	Collier		1,717					
Pinecraft	Sarasota		486	x	x	x	x	
Pineland	Lee		466					
Pinewood	Miami-Dade		17,246					
Pioneer	Hendry		752					
Pittman	Lake		227					
Plantation	Sarasota		5,034					
Plantation Island	Collier		119					
Plantation Mobile Home Park	Palm Beach		1,462					
Poinciana	Osceola • Polk		68,280					
Point Baker	Santa Rosa		3,072					
Port Charlotte	Charlotte		60,625					
Port LaBelle	Hendry • Glades		5,450					
Port St. John	Brevard		23,474					
Port Salerno	Martin		10,401					
Pretty Bayou	Bay		2,911					
Princeton	Miami-Dade		39,308					
Progress Village	Hillsborough		11,188					
Punta Rassa	Lee		1,620					
Quail Ridge	Pasco		2,543					
Rainbow Lakes Estates	Levy • Marion		3,438	x	x	x	x	
Rainbow Park	Marion		1,672	x	x	x	x	
Rainbow Springs	Marion		5,091	x	x	x	x	
Raleigh	Levy		357					
Richmond Heights	Miami-Dade		8,944					
Richmond West	Miami-Dade		35,884					
Ridge Manor	Hernando		4,743					
Ridge Wood Heights	Sarasota		5,064					
Ridgecrest	Pinellas		2,966					
Rio	Martin		980					
Rio Pinar	Orange		5,409					
River Park	St. Lucie		5,362					
River Ridge	Pasco		6,514					
Riverview	Hillsborough		107,396					
Roeville	Santa Rosa		607					
Roosevelt Gardens	Broward		2,749					
Roseland	Indian River		1,591					
Rotonda	Charlotte		10,114					
Royal Palm Estates	Palm Beach		1,974					
Ruskin	Hillsborough		28,620					
Samoset	Manatee		4,146					
Samsula-Spruce Creek	Volusia		4,877					
San Carlos Park	Lee		18,563					
San Castle	Palm Beach		3,755					
Sarasota Springs	Sarasota		12,521					
Sawgrass	St. Johns		5,385					
Schall Circle	Palm Beach		792					
Scottsmoor	Brevard		692	x	x	x	x	
Seffner	Hillsborough		8,362					
Seminole Manor	Palm Beach		2,562					
Seville	Volusia		917					
Shady Hills	Pasco		11,690					
Sharpes	Brevard		3,115					
Siesta Key	Sarasota		5,454					
Silver Lake	Lake		2,101					
Silver Springs	Marion		2,844	x	x	x	x	
Silver Springs Shores	Marion		24,846					
Silver Springs Shores East	Marion		1,210	x	x	x	x	
Sky Lake	Orange		7,226					
Solana	Charlotte		671					
Sorrento	Lake		845					
South Apopka	Orange		6,803					
South Beach	Indian River		3,703					
South Bradenton	Manatee		26,858					
South Brooksville	Hernando		4,311					
South Gate Ridge	Sarasota		6,024					
South Highpoint	Pinellas		5,018					
South Miami Heights	Miami-Dade		36,770					
South Patrick Shores	Brevard		6,496					
South Sarasota	Sarasota		5,133					
South Venice	Sarasota		15,619					
Southchase	Orange		16,276					
Southeast Arcadia	DeSoto		6,299					
Southgate	Sarasota		6,287					
Spring Hill	Hernando		113,568					
Spring Lake	Hernando		465					
Spring Ridge	Gilchrist		442					
Springhill	Santa Rosa		169					
St. Augustine Shores	St. Johns		8,706					
St. Augustine South	St. Johns		5,066					
St. George Island	Franklin		1,006					
St. James City	Lee		3,876					
Stacey Street	Palm Beach		978					
Steinhatchee	Taylor		1,049					
Stock Island	Monroe		4,722					
Sugarmill Woods	Citrus		11,204					
Sumatra	Liberty		148					
Sun City Center	Hillsborough		30,952					
Suncoast Estates	Lee		4,097					
Sunset	Miami-Dade		15,912					
Taft	Orange		2,221					
Tamiami	Miami-Dade		54,212					
Tangelo Park	Orange		2,459					
Tangerine	Orange		3,237					
Tavernier	Monroe		2,530					
Taylor Creek	Okeechobee		4,470					
The Acreage	Palm Beach		39,863					
The Crossings	Miami-Dade		23,276					
The Hammocks	Miami-Dade		59,480					
The Meadows	Sarasota		5,037					
The Villages	Sumter • Marion • Lake		79,077					
Thonotosassa	Hillsborough		15,238					
Three Lakes	Miami-Dade		16,540					
Three Oaks	Lee		5,472					
Tice	Lee		4,853					
Tierra Verde	Pinellas		3,836					
Tiger Point	Santa Rosa		3,342					
Tildenville	Orange		475					
Timber Pines	Hernando		5,163					
Town 'n' Country	Hillsborough		85,951					
Trilby	Pasco		433					
Trinity	Pasco		11,924					
Tropical Park	Brevard		2,013	x	x	x	x	
Tyndall AFB	Bay		139					
Union Park	Orange		10,452					
University	Hillsborough		50,893					
University	Orange		36,709					
Upper Grand Lagoon	Bay		15,778					
Valrico	Hillsborough		37,895					
Vamo	Sarasota		2,822					
Venice Gardens	Sarasota		3,402					
Verandah	Lee		1,791	x	x	x	x	
Vero Beach South	Indian River		28,020					
Vero Lake Estates	Indian River		6,782	x	x	x	x	
Verona Walk	Collier		2,713		x	x	x	
Viera East	Brevard		11,687		x	x	x	
Viera West	Brevard		16,688		x	x	x	{
Vilano Beach	St. Johns		2,514	x	x	x	x	
Villas	Lee		12,687					
Vineyards	Collier		3,883					
Wabasso	Indian River		1,627					
Wabasso Beach	Indian River		2,194					
Wacissa	Jefferson		362					
Wahneta	Polk		4,409					
Wallace	Santa Rosa		3,868					
Warm Mineral Springs	Sarasota		5,442					
Warrington	Escambia		15,218					
Washington Park	Broward		1,948					
Watergate	Palm Beach		3,459					
Watertown	Columbia		3,018					
Waukeenah	Jefferson		259					
Waverly	Polk		661					
Wedgefield	Orange		8,017					
Weeki Wachee Gardens	Hernando		1,138					
Wekiwa Springs	Seminole		23,428					
Wesley Chapel	Pasco		64,866					
West Bradenton	Manatee		4,247					
West Canaveral Groves	Brevard		272	x	x	x	x	
West DeLand	Volusia		3,908					
West Lealman	Pinellas		16,438					
West Little River	Miami-Dade		34,128					
West Pensacola	Escambia		21,019					
West Perrine	Miami-Dade		10,602					
West Samoset	Manatee		6,482					
West Vero Corridor	Indian River		10,039					
Westchase	Hillsborough		25,952					
Westchester	Miami-Dade		56,384					
Westgate	Palm Beach		8,435					
Westview	Miami-Dade		9,923					
Westwood Lakes	Miami-Dade		11,373					
Whiskey Creek	Lee		4,842					
White City	St. Lucie		3,779					
Whitfield	Manatee		2,989					
Whitfield	Santa Rosa		312					
Williamsburg	Orange		7,908					
Williston Highlands	Levy		2,591					
Willow Oak	Polk		6,806					
Wimauma	Hillsborough		9,467					
Winding Cypress	Collier		697	x	x	x	x	
Windsor	Indian River		330					
Winter Beach	Indian River		3,136					
Wiscon	Hernando		681					
Woodlawn Beach	Santa Rosa		2,741					
Woodville	Leon		4,097					
World Golf Village	St. Johns		22,117					
Wright	Okaloosa		26,277					
Yalaha	Lake		1,505					
Yeehaw Junction	Osceola		240					
Yulee	Nassau		14,195					
Zellwood	Orange		2,758					
Zephyrhills North	Pasco		2,663					
Zephyrhills South	Pasco		4,985					
Zephyrhills West	Pasco		5,533					

== Former census-designated places ==
CDP	County	Location of County	Population (2020)	Population (2010)	Population (2000)	Population (1990)	Population (1980)	Notes
Carol City	Miami-Dade		x	61,233	59,443	53,331	47,349	Merged to form the city of Miami Gardens in 2003 but still listed as a CDP in 2010
Andover	Miami-Dade		x	x	8,489	6,251		Merged to form the city of Miami Gardens in 2003
Norland	Miami-Dade		x	x	22,995	22,109	19,471	Merged to form the city of Miami Gardens in 2003
Scott Lake	Miami-Dade		x	x	14,401	14,588	14,154	Merged to form the city of Miami Gardens in 2003
Lake Lucerne	Miami-Dade		x	x	9,132	9,478	9,762	Merged to form the city of Miami Gardens in 2003
Opa-locka North	Miami-Dade		x	x	6,224	6,568	5,721	Merged to form the city of Miami Gardens in 2003
Bunche Park	Miami-Dade		x	x	3,972	4,388	5,773	Merged to form the city of Miami Gardens in 2003
Boyette	Hillsborough		x	x	5,895			Merged into Riverview CDP prior to the 2010 U.S. census
North Beach	Indian River		x	x	243			Deleted prior to the 2010 U.S. census; part taken to form Windsor CDP
Hiland Park	Bay		x	x	999	3,865	4,763	Deleted prior to the 2010 U.S. census; parts annexed to Lynn Haven and Springfield cities and part taken to form part of Cedar Grove CDP
Browardale	Broward		x	x	x	6,257	7,571	First appeared as an unincorporated community in the 1970 U.S. census (pop 17,444). Split into Broward Estates CDP and the St George CDP prior to the 2000 U.S. census.
Bonnie Lock-Woodsetter North	Broward		x	x	4,275	x	x	annexed to the city of Deerfield Beach
Broadview-Pompano Park	Broward		x	x				annexed to the city of North Lauderdale
Broward Estates	Broward		x	x	3,416	x	x	annexed to the city of Lauderhill
Carver Ranches	Broward		x	x	4,299	x	x	Listed as an unincorporated place under the name Carver Ranch Estates in the 1970 U.S. census (pop 5,515). Incorporated into the city of West Park
Chambers Estates	Broward		x	x				annexed to the city of Dania Beach
Chula Vista	Broward		x	x				annexed to the city of Fort Lauderdale
Collier Manor-Cresthaven	Broward		x	x				annexed to the city of Pompano Beach
Country Estates	Broward		x	x				incorporated into the town of Southwest Ranches
Crystal Lake	Broward		x	x				annexed to the city of Deerfield Beach
Edgewater	Broward		x	x				annexed to the city of Dania Beach
Estates of Fort Lauderdale	Broward		x	x	1,791	x	x	annexed to the city of Dania Beach and the city of Hollywood
Godfrey Road	Broward		x	x				annexed to the city of Parkland
Golden Heights	Broward		x	x				part annexed to the city of Fort Lauderdale and part added to the Roosevelt Gardens CDP
Green Meadow	Broward		x	x				incorporated into the town of Southwest Ranches
Hillsboro Ranches	Broward		x	x				annexed to the city of Coconut Creek
Ivanhoe Estates	Broward		x	x				incorporated into the town of Southwest Ranches
Kendall Green	Broward		x	x				annexed to the city of Pompano Beach
Lake Forest	Broward		x	x				incorporated into the city of West Park
Leisureville	Broward		x	x				annexed to the city of Pompano Beach
Loch Lomond	Broward		x	x				annexed to the city of Pompano Beach
Melrose Park	Broward		x	x				annexed to the city of Fort Lauderdale
Miami Gardens	Broward		x	x				incorporated into the city of West Park
North Andrews Gardens	Broward		x	x				annexed to the city of Oakland Park
Oak Point	Broward		x	x				annexed to the city of Hollywood
Palm Aire	Broward		x	x				annexed to the city of Fort Lauderdale
Pine Island Ridge	Broward		x	x				annexed to the town of Davie
Pompano Beach Highlands	Broward		x	x				annexed to the city of Pompano Beach
Pompano Estates	Broward		x	x				annexed to the city of Deerfield Beach
Ramblewood East	Broward		x	x				annexed to the city of Coral Springs
Ravenswood Estates	Broward		x	x				annexed to the city of Dania Beach
Riverland Village	Broward		x	x				annexed to the city of Fort Lauderdale
Rock Island	Broward		x	x				annexed to the city of Fort Lauderdale
Rolling Oaks	Broward		x	x				incorporated into the town of Southwest Ranches
Royal Palm Ranches	Broward		x	x				annexed to the city of Cooper City
St. George	Broward		x	x	2,450	x	x	annexed to the city of Lauderhill
Sunshine Acres	Broward		x	x				annexed to the city of Cooper City and the town of Davie
Sunshine Ranches	Broward		x	x				part annexed to the city of Cooper City and the remainder incorporated into the town of Southwest Ranches
Tedder	Broward		x	x				annexed to the city of Deerfield Beach
Terra Mar	Broward		x	x				annexed to the town of Lauderdale-by-the-Sea
Twin Lakes	Broward		x	x				annexed to the city of Fort Lauderdale and the city of Oakland Park
Utopia	Broward		x	x				incorporated into the city of West Park
University Park	Miami-Dade		x	26,995	26,538			Merged into the Westchester CDP prior to the 2020 U.S. census
Village Park	Broward		x	x				annexed to the city of North Lauderdale
West Ken-Lark	Broward		x	x				annexed to the city of Lauderhill
Brewster	Polk		x	3	x	x	x	

== See also ==
- List of counties in Florida
- List of municipalities in Florida
- List of former municipalities in Florida
- List of places in Florida
