= List of places in Florida: Q-R =

This list of current cities, towns, unincorporated communities, counties, and other recognized places in the U.S. state of Florida also includes information on the number and names of counties in which the place lies, and its lower and upper zip code bounds, if applicable.

Name of place	Number of counties	Counties	Lower zip code	Upper zip code
Quail Heights	1	Miami-Dade	33157	
Quail Ridge	1	Pasco		
Queens Cove	1	St. Lucie		
Quinavista	1	Escambia		
Quincy	1	Gadsden	32351	
Quinlan	1	Duval	32218	
Quintette	1	Escambia		
Raccoon Key	1	Monroe	33040	
Rafters	1	Lee	33907	
Raiford	1	Union	32083	
Rainbow Falls	1	Marion		
Rainbow Homes	1	Palm Beach	33444	
Rainbow Lakes	1	Palm Beach		
Rainbow Lakes Estates	2	Levy, Marion	34430	
Raleigh	1	Levy	32696	
Ralston Beach	1	Hillsborough	33614	
Ramblewood East	1	Broward		
Rambo	1	Jackson		
Ramrod Key	1	Monroe	33042	
Ramsey Beach	1	Escambia		
Ratliff	1	Nassau		
Rattlesnake	1	Hillsborough		
Ravenna Park	1	Seminole	32771	
Ravenswood Estates	1	Broward		
Ravines	1	Clay		
Rawls	1	Hamilton		
Rawls Park	1	Polk	33801	
Reavills Corner	1	Lake		
Recruit Training Command	1	Orange	32813	
Red Ballon	1	Pinellas	33575	
Redbay	1	Walton	32455	
Reddick	1	Marion	32686	
Red Head	1	Washington	32437	
Redington Beach	1	Pinellas	33708	
Redington Shores	1	Pinellas	33708	
Redland	1	Miami-Dade	33030	
Red Level	1	Citrus	32629	
Red Level Junction	1	Citrus		
Reedy Creek	2	Orange, Osceola		
Reeves	1	Hillsborough		
Regency	1	Duval	32211	
Regis	1	Putnam		
Relay	1	Flagler		
Remlap	1	Hillsborough		
Remley Heights	1	Lake	32757	
Remuda Ranch Grants	1	Collier	33933	
Rerdell	1	Hernando	33597	
Resota Beach	1	Bay	32401	
Reston	1	Gadsden		
Reunion	1	Osceola	34747	
Rex	1	Alachua	32640	
Ribault Manor	1	Duval	32208	
Rice Creek	1	Putnam		
Rich Bay	1	Gadsden		
Richey Lakes	1	Pasco	33552	
Richfield	1	Manatee		
Richland	1	Pasco		
Richloam	1	Hernando	33597	
Richmond	1	Miami-Dade		
Richmond Heights	1	Miami-Dade	33156	
Richmond West	1	Miami-Dade		
Richter Crossroads	1	Jackson		
Rideout	1	Clay	32030	
Ridgecrest	1	Pinellas		
Ridge Harbor	1	Charlotte	33950	
Ridge Manor	1	Hernando	33525	
Ridge Manor West	1	Hernando		
Ridgetop	1	Jackson		
Ridgewood	1	Alachua	32601	
Ridgewood	1	Clay	32073	
Ridgewood	1	Polk		
Ridgewood	1	Putnam		
Ridge Wood Heights	1	Sarasota	33581	
Rileys Park	1	Lake	32757	
Rinker	1	Palm Beach		
Rio	1	Martin	33457	
Riomar	1	Indian River		
Rio Pinar	1	Orange		
Rio Vista Isles	1	Broward		
Rital	1	Hernando	33593	
Ritta	1	Hendry		
Ritta	1	Palm Beach	33440	
Ritta Island	1	Palm Beach		
River Bridge	1	Indian River		
Riverdale	1	Hernando	33525	
Riverdale	1	Pasco		
Riverdale	1	St. Johns		
River Forest	1	Lake		
Rivergate	1	Volusia	32074	
River Junction	1	Gadsden	32324	
Riverland	1	Broward		
Riverland	1	Hernando		
Riverland Village	1	Broward	33312	
River Lawn	1	Lee	33905	
River Park	1	St. Lucie		
River Ranch	1	Polk	33867	
River Ranch Shores	1	Polk	33853	
River Ridge	1	Pasco		
Riverside	1	Duval	32204	
Riverside	1	Miami-Dade	33135	
Riverside	1	Washington		
Riverside Acres	1	Orange		
Riverview	1	Duval	32208	
Riverview	1	Escambia	32501	
Riverview	1	Hillsborough	33569	
Riviera Beach	1	Palm Beach	33404	
Riviera Colony	1	Collier	33940	
Rixford	1	Suwannee	32060	
Roan	1	Lake		
Roberts	1	Escambia		
Robertsville	1	Gadsden		
Robin Hill	1	Seminole	32701	
Robinson Heights	1	Alachua		
Robinson Point	1	Santa Rosa	32570	
Rochelle	1	Alachua	32601	
Rock	1	Hernando		
Rock Bluff	1	Liberty	32321	
Rock Creek	1	Jackson		
Rock Creek	1	Okaloosa		
Rockdale	1	Miami-Dade		
Rockdale Keys	1	Miami-Dade	33157	
Rocket City	1	Orange		
Rock Harbor	1	Monroe	33043	
Rock Hill	1	Broward	33314	
Rock Hill	1	Walton	32433	
Rock Island	1	Broward		
Rock Island	1	Collier		
Rock Island Village	1	Broward	33314	
Rockland	1	Polk		
Rockland Junction	1	Polk		
Rockland Key	1	Monroe		
Rockledge	1	Brevard	32955	
Rockport	1	Hillsborough		
Rock Ridge	1	Polk		
Rocksprings	1	Marion		
Rock Springs	1	Orange	32703	
Rockwell	1	Brevard		
Rocky Creek	1	Hillsborough	33615	
Rocky Point	1	Alachua		
Rodman	1	Putnam		
Roeville	1	Santa Rosa		
Ro-len Lake Gardens	1	Broward	33009	
Rolling Acres	1	Hernando	34602	
Rolling Hills	1	Duval	32205	
Rolling Hills	1	Polk	33867	
Rolling Oaks	1	Broward	33314	
Rollins Corner	1	Calhoun		
Romeo	1	Marion	32630	
Rood	1	Palm Beach		
Roosevelt Estates	1	Palm Beach	33406	
Roosevelt Gardens	1	Broward		
Rose	1	Levy		
Rosedale	1	Gadsden	32324	
Rosedale	1	Manatee		
Roseland	1	Indian River	32957	
Rosemary Beach	1	Walton		
Rosemont	1	Orange		
Rosemont Hills	1	Orange	32804	
Rosewood	1	Levy	32625	
Ross Prairie	1	Marion		
Rotonda	1	Charlotte		
Rotonda West	1	Charlotte	33947	
Round Lake	1	Jackson	32447	
Roux Quarters	1	Polk		
Roy	1	Flagler		
Royal	1	Sumter	32785	
Royal Country	1	Miami-Dade		
Royal Gardens Estates	1	Manatee	33505	
Royal Oak Hills	1	Palm Beach	33432	
Royal Palm Beach	1	Palm Beach	33411	
Royal Palm Estates	1	Palm Beach		
Royal Palm Hammock	1	Collier		
Royal Palm Isles	1	Broward		
Royal Palm Ranches	1	Broward		
Royal Palms Park	1	Broward		
Royal Pal Village	1	Lee	33901	
Royal Poinciana Park	1	Indian River		
Royals Crossroads	1	Holmes	32464	
Royal Terrace	1	Duval		
Royster	1	Polk		
Rubonia	1	Manatee	34221	
Runnymede	1	Osceola		
Runyon	1	Palm Beach		
Ruskin	1	Hillsborough	33570	
Russell	1	Clay	32043	
Rutland	1	Sumter	33538	
Rutledge	1	Alachua	32601	
Ryan's Trailer Park	1	Putnam		
Rye	1	Manatee		

== See also ==
- Florida
- List of municipalities in Florida
- List of former municipalities in Florida
- List of counties in Florida
- List of census-designated places in Florida
