= Plantation (disambiguation) =

Plantation may refer to:

- Plantation, large farm or estate
  - Plantation complexes in the Southern United States
- Plantation (settlement or colony), early method of colonization
  - Plantations of Ireland

United States places

- Plantation Estate, the Winter White House of President Barack Obama, in Hawaii
- Plantation, Florida (disambiguation): a city in SE Florida, an island in SW Florida, and a few smaller communities
- Plantation, Kentucky, city in Jefferson County, Kentucky
- Plantation (Maine), a type of minor civil division
- Providence Plantations, the first permanent European American settlement in Rhode Island
  - Colony of Rhode Island and Providence Plantations, one of the original Thirteen Colonies established on the east coast of America, bordering the Atlantic Ocean
  - State of Rhode Island and Providence Plantations, former official name of the State of Rhode Island

Other

- Plantation, Glasgow, an area of the city of Glasgow, Scotland
- Plantation Records, a defunct American country music label
- The Plantation, a 2000 novel by Chris Kuzneski

== See also ==
- Category:Plantations
