= Brownsdale =

Browndale may refer to any of the following communities:

== Canada ==
- Brownsdale, Newfoundland and Labrador, a small fishing village on the Trinity Bay side of the northern tip of the Bay de Verde Peninsula, Newfoundland and Labrador, Canada

== United States ==
- Brownsdale, Florida an unincorporated community in Santa Rosa County, Florida
- Brownsdale, Minnesota, a city in Mower County, Minnesota
- Brownsdale, an unincorporated community in Allegheny County, Pennsylvania
- Brownsdale, an unincorporated community in Butler County, Pennsylvania
- Brownsdale, an unincorporated community in Wayne County, Pennsylvania
