= Sunshine Acres =

Sunshine Acres may refer to:

- Sunshine Acres, Florida
- Sunshine Acres, Queensland, a locality in the Fraser Coast Region, Queensland, Australia
