= Detwiler's Farm Market =

Local Farm Market

Detwiler's Farm Market, Inc.
- Trade name: Detwiler's Farm Market
- Company type: Private
- Industry: Produce
- Founded: 2002
- Founder: Henry Detwiler Sr.
- Headquarters: Palmetto, Florida, United States
- Number of locations: 6 stores (2023)
- Area served: Sarasota metropolitan area
- Website: https://detwilermarket.com/

Detwiler's Farm Market, also informally known as Detwiler's, is a chain of grocery stores. Founded in 2002 by Henry Detwiler, Detwiler's Farm Market is a private corporation owned by members of Detwiler's family. As of 2023, Detwiler's Farm Market has 6 locations inside the Sarasota metropolitan area.

== Origins ==
Detwiler's Farm Market was created by Henry Detwiler Sr., who is the third born in a family of eight. He was raised on an 8-acre farm as a Mennonite in Franconia, PA, the grandson of a butcher. Detwiler eventually began retailing alongside his brothers at Franconia Meats. Detwiler also worked at Landis Supermarket, working with his father and grandfather, who were both farmers, making deliveries and grinding hamburger meat. After returning to Florida in 1999, Detwiler created a roadside stand, which would expand until 2002, where Detwiler would partner with the Fruitville Grove Market for seven years, until the landlord asked for higher rent. In 2009, Detwiler's Farm Market opened its doors on Palmer Boulevard in Sarasota, Florida. The second location opened in Venice, Florida in 2013, Bradenton, Florida in 2015, two more locations in 2018 and 2019 in Sarasota, and the sixth location in West Bradenton, Florida in 2023. Detwiler's will eventually be expanding south to nearby Port Charlotte, Florida and North Port, Florida.
