= Watergate (disambiguation) =

Watergate refers to the Watergate scandal, a 1972 break-in of the National Democratic Committee Headquarters at the Watergate Hotel by members of Republican U.S. President Richard Nixon's administration and the resulting cover-up.

Watergate may also refer to:

== Gates ==
- Water gate, a gate opening onto water, or only or mainly accessible by water
  - Traitors' Gate, an entrance to the Tower of London, England
  - York Watergate or Buckingham Watergate, names for the York House Watergate, London, England

== Places ==
=== Thailand ===
- Pratunam (Thai: ประตูน้ำ, lit. 'water gate'), an intersection and neighborhood in Bangkok

=== United Kingdom ===
- Watergate, a former area of Oxford known for its College of the Franciscans – see Haymo of Faversham
- Watergate, Chester, Cheshire
- Watergate, Cornwall
- Watergate (Perth, Scotland), a street in Perth and Kinross
- Watergate Bay, Cornwall
- Watergate Beach, Cornwall
- Watergate Halt railway station, a defunct station in Devon
- Watergate Theatre, London, a former theatre in London, England

=== United States ===
- Watergate, Florida
- Watergate complex, an office-apartment-hotel complex built in 1967 in Washington, D.C., near a watergate onto the Potomac River

== Arts, entertainment, and media ==
- Watergate (album), by American hip hop group Thirsty Fish
- Watergate (board game), a 2019 board game based on the Watergate scandal
- Watergate (documentary series), a 1994 Emmy award-winning documentary by Mick Gold
- "Watergate" (Stargate SG-1), an episode from Season 4
- Watergate, a 2012 novel by Thomas Mallon
- Watergate, an alias used by DJ Quicksilver for some of his EP's
- Watergate: The Hidden History: Nixon, The Mafia, and The CIA, book by Lamar Waldron

== Other uses ==
- Watergate salad, a dish made with pistachio pudding and whipped cream
- Watergate tapes, also known as the Nixon White House tapes, a collection of conversations between U.S. President Richard Nixon and various White House staff members

== See also ==
- Gate (disambiguation)
- Gate (water transport)
- List of scandals with "-gate" suffix
- Oceangate (disambiguation)
- Rivergate (disambiguation)
- Seagate (disambiguation)
- Water (disambiguation)
- Gate valve
