= Rivergate =

Rivergate or River Gate, may refer to:

== Places in the United States ==
- Rivergate, Volusia County, Florida, a named location in Florida
- Rivergate Industrial District, Portland, Oregon; an industrial park in Portland
- Rivergate Mall, Goodlettsville, Tennessee; a defunct shopping mall
- Rivergate Tower, Tampa, Florida; an office building
- Rivergate Convention Center, New Orleans; a convention center
- Rivergate Park, Cleveland, Ohio; a park in Cleveland
- Rivergate, Manhattan, New York; a residential skyscraper renamed to View 34

== Other users ==
- Operation River Gate (2005) a military operation in Iraq, part of Operation Sayeed

== See also ==
- Watergate (architecture), a watercoure security and access doorway found adjacent to rivers
- Gate (water transport), a watercourse transit impoundment water level changing device, found paralleling rivers
- Rivergate House (novel) by Hillary Waugh
- Rivergate Adventist Elementary, Gladstone, Oregon, USA, see List of Seventh-day Adventist secondary schools
- Gates River, British Columbia, Canada; a river
- Gate (disambiguation)
- River (disambiguation)
- Watergate (disambiguation)
