= St. George, Florida =

St. George, Florida may refer to:

- St. George, Broward County, Florida, a former census-designated place, now a neighborhood of Lauderhill
- St. George, Pinellas County, Florida, a place in Pinellas County, Florida
- St. George Island (Florida) in Franklin County

== See also ==
- St. George, Georgia, located just across the St. Marys River from Florida
