= Rosedale, Florida =

Rosedale, Florida may refer to:

- Rosedale, Gadsden County, Florida, a community south of Chattahoochee, Florida
- Rosedale, Manatee County, Florida, a former name of West Bradenton from the 1960 U.S. Census
