= OceanGate (disambiguation) =

OceanGate is a manufacturer of underwater vehicles for tourism, industry, research, and exploration.

Ocean Gate, Oceangate, may also refer to:

- Ocean Gate, New Jersey, a borough in New Jersey, United States
- Ocean Gate School District, Ocean County, New Jersey, United States
  - Ocean Gate Elementary School, Ocean Gate School District

== See also ==
- OceanGate Titan submersible implosion (18 June 2023) at the RMS Titanic wreck
- Ocean Gateway (disambiguation)
- Gate (disambiguation)
- Ocean (disambiguation)
- Seagate (disambiguation)
- Watergate (disambiguation)
