= Florida Central Academy =

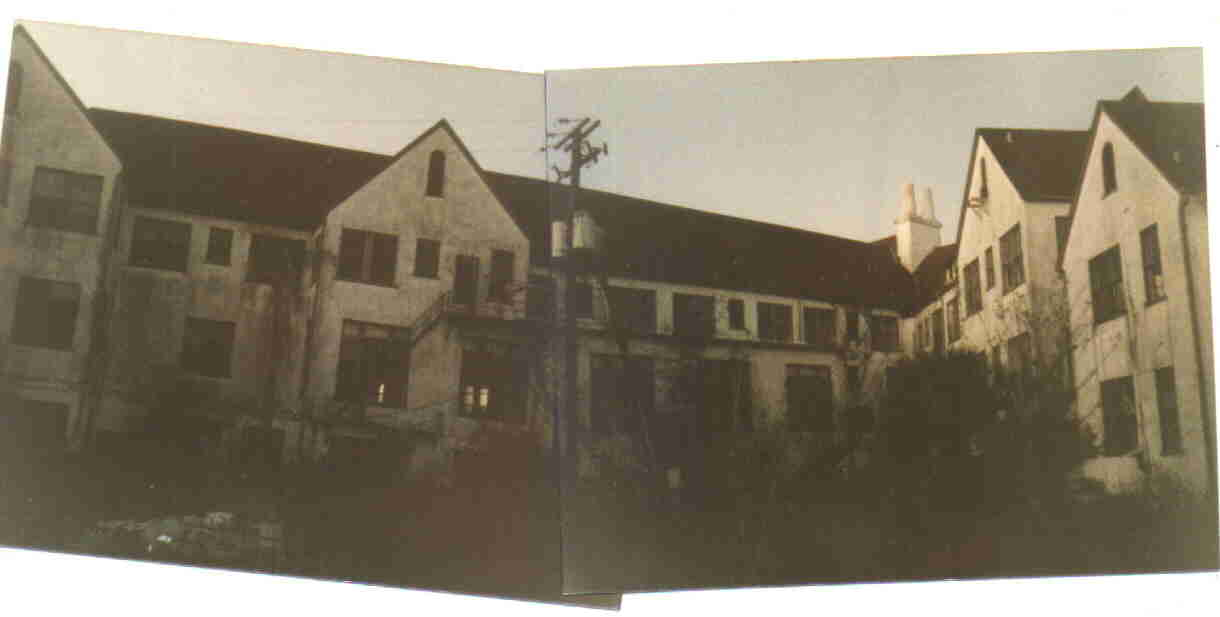

Location
- Mount Plymouth, Florida; United States
- 28.792099°N 81.538724°W

Information
- Type: Prep
- Established: 1959
- Enrollment: 200
- Campus size: 45 acres (180,000 m^{2})
- Campus type: Rural
- Mascot: Red Devils
- Website: fca-alumni.org

Florida Central Academy was a college preparatory boarding school in Mount Plymouth, Florida, United States. It was founded as a school for boys by Colonel L. E. Allen and General T. L. Alexander in 1959 and classes began with the 1960–61 school year. There were a total of 23 senior classes. In 1971 the school became fully co-educational. The campus was situated on 45 acres (182,000 m^{2}). The school was closed in 1983.

== History ==
The main school building was a Victorian structure with steep roof lines and large chimneys. The building was originally four stories and had 230 rooms. Carl Dann Sr. built it in 1926 during the Florida land boom. It was called the Mt. Plymouth Hotel and Country Club. At one time it had the largest dining room in Florida. The golf course was modeled after St. Andrews Golf Club in Scotland.

The last class graduated in May, 1983. A few weeks later, the school was seized by United States bankruptcy court, prior to the settlement of claims from 330 of the school's creditors. The school was closed and all business transactions were halted. The building was condemned and abandoned, and vandals destroyed much of the structure.

In 1986, the entire building except for one wing burned to the ground. Shortly thereafter the entire site was razed, with no trace of the building left.

It has recently been designated a National Historical Site.

== Gallery ==
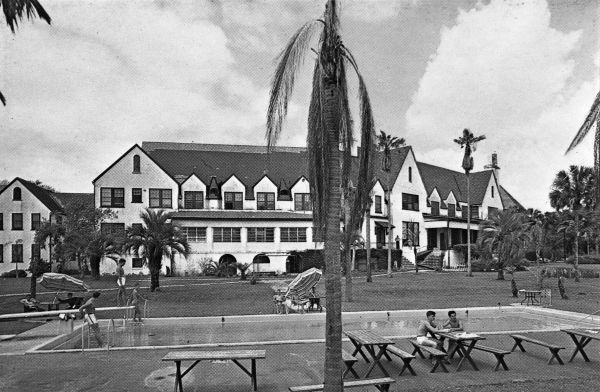
The front of the main building

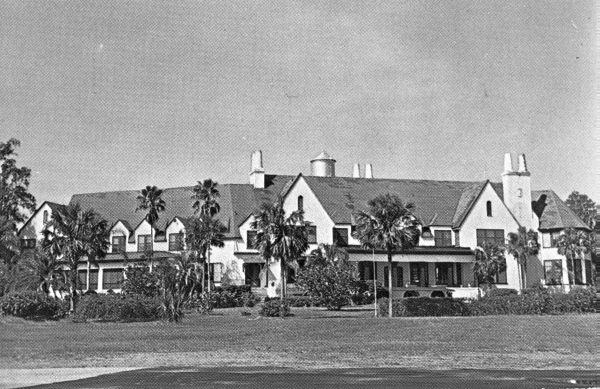
The front of the main building
