= Seagate =

Seagate or Sea Gate may refer to:

- Sea gate, a channel or waterway which gives access to the ocean
- Sea-gate, a castle drawbridge

== Locations ==
=== In the United States ===
- Sea Gate, Brooklyn, a gated community in New York
- SeaGate Convention Centre in Toledo, Ohio
- Seagate (Manatee County, Florida), a historic estate built in Florida in 1929
- Seagate, North Carolina, a community in North Carolina
- One SeaGate, a building in Toledo, Ohio

=== In Scotland ===
- Seagate, Dundee, one of the medieval thoroughfares in the centre of Dundee, Scotland
  - Seagate bus station, a station in Dundee
- Seagate Castle, a castle North Ayrshire

== Business ==
- Seagate Technology, a data storage company
- Sea Gate Distributors, a defunct comic book distributor
- Seagate Software, a defunct software company

== See also ==
- Watergate (architecture)
- Gate (water transport)
- Gate (disambiguation)
- Sea (disambiguation)
- Oceangate (disambiguation)
- Watergate (disambiguation)
