= Plantation, Florida (disambiguation) =

Plantation is the name of the following places in the U.S. state of Florida:

- Plantation, Florida, city in Broward County; the largest of the places named Plantation in Florida
- Plantation, Sarasota County, Florida, census-designated place
- Plantation Island, Florida, census-designated place in Collier County
- Plantation Key, island in Monroe County and part of the Florida Keys
  - Plantation Key, Florida, former census-designated place in Monroe County
