= Desoto Acres, Florida =

- Census-designated place
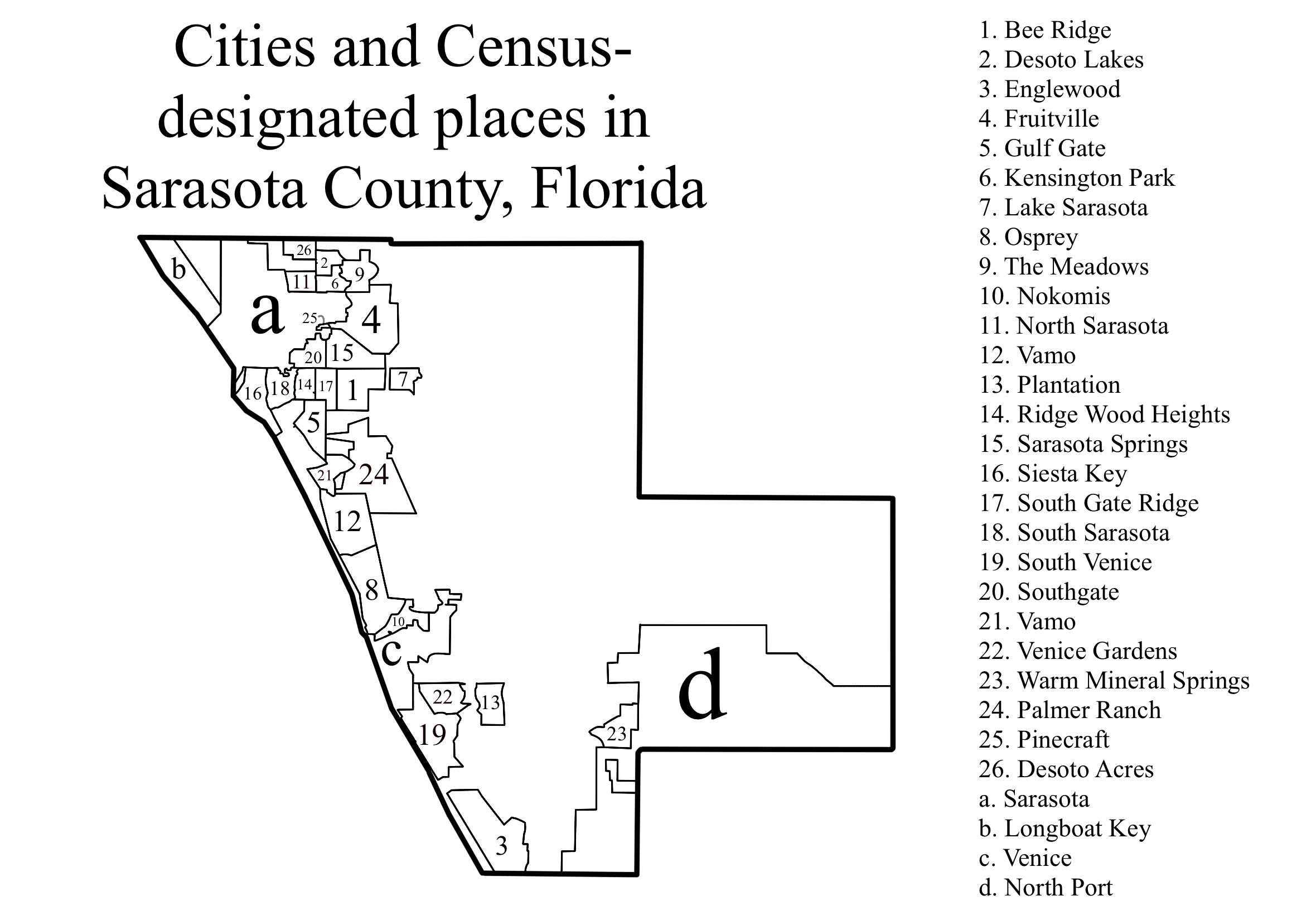
- Desoto Acres in Sarasota County (26).

- Location within Florida Location within the United States
- Coordinates: 27°22′43″N 82°30′55″W
- Country: United States
- State: Florida
- County: Sarasota

Area
  - Total: 1.32 sq mi (3.41 km^{2})
  - Land: 1.31 sq mi (3.38 km^{2})
  - Water: 0.012 sq mi (0.03 km^{2})
- Elevation: 39 ft (12 m)

Population (2020)
  - Total: 720
  - Density: 550.9/sq mi (212.71/km^{2})
- Time zone: UTC-5 (Eastern (EST))
  - Summer (DST): UTC-4 (EDT)
- ZIP Codes: 34234, 34243 (Sarasota)
- Area code: 941
- FIPS code: 12-17273
- GNIS feature ID: 2805173

Desoto Acres is a census-designated place (CDP) in northwestern Sarasota County, Florida, United States. It is 4 miles (6 km) north of downtown Sarasota and is bordered to the east by Desoto Lakes.

Desoto Acres was first listed as a CDP prior to the 2020 census. The population was 720 at the 2020 census. It is part of the North Port-Bradenton-Sarasota, Florida Metropolitan Statistical Area.

== Demographics ==
Historical population
Census	Pop.	Note	%±
2020	720		—
U.S. Decennial Census

Desoto Acres first appeared as a census designated place in the 2020 U.S. census.

As of the 2020, Desoto Acres had a population of 720 with a total of 296 households. The median household income was $68,986. 30.3% of the population 25 years and older had a bachelor's degree or higher. The CDP had an employment rate of 73.1%. 10.9% of the population lived without healthcare coverage.
