= Ocean Gateway =

Ocean Gatway may refer to:

- Ocean Gateway (Maryland), United States; a highway, part of U.S. 50
- Ocean Gateway International Marine Passenger Terminal, Portland, Maine, United States; a cruise ship terminal
- Ocean Gateway (North West England), England, United Kingdom; a redevelopment project for the region between Manchester and Merseyside
- ocean gateway, a strait, a seaway connecting two oceans

== See also ==
- Old Ocean Gateway, Maryland, United States; a highway, part of Maryland Route 731
- Oceangate (disambiguation)
- Gateway (disambiguation)
- Ocean (disambiguation)
- Gate (disambiguation)
- Way (disambiguation)
- Ocean Way
