= Rio Pinar Country Club =

Golf club in Rio Pinar, Florida

Rio Pinar Golf
- Location in the United States Location in Florida
- Interactive map of Rio Pinar Golf
- 28.525°N 81.265°W

Club information
- Location: Rio Pinar, Florida, U.S.
- Established: 1957, 69 years ago
- Type: Semi/private
- Tota holes: 18
- Tournaments: Florida Citrus Open; Lady Citrus Open
- Designed by: Mark Mahannah (1957); Lloyd Clifton (1995)
- Par: 72
- Length: 7,001 yards (6,402 m)
- Course rating: 73.9
- Slope rating: 130

The Rio Pinar Country Club is a semi-private golf club located in Rio Pinar, Florida, a suburban subdivision of Orlando.

The golf course at Rio Pinar was initially designed by Mark Mahannah in 1957, and featured medium-sized greens, strategically placed bunkers and narrow fairways framed by pine and oak trees. Lloyd Clifton was hired by the club in 1995 to give a refresh to Mahannah's then forty-year old design. Clifton put a focus on enlarging the greens and reshaping bunkers while staying true to the original vision for the course.

== Florida Citrus Open ==
Established in 1957, the golf course was the original site of the Florida Citrus Open (now Arnold Palmer Invitational) on the PGA Tour from 1966 through 1978. with the initial purse being $110,000, with a $21,000 cut for the winner. The winner's share increased to $40,000 by 1975.

In the 13-year span that Rio Pinar hosted the Open, the tournament was a popular stop on the PGA Tour, with winners of the event including Lee Trevino, Hale Irwin, Julius Boros, and Arnold Palmer, all of which are members of the World Golf Hall of Fame. Palmer's win in the 1971 Citrus Open was his first of four wins during the 1971 PGA Tour, which would be his final tournament wins as a solo player. After purchasing the nearby Bay Hill Club and Lodge in 1974, Palmer lobbied PGA officials to move their Orlando tournament to his course, which they did in 1979.

After the departure of the PGA, Rio Pinar was the site of the LPGA Tour's Lady Citrus Open from 1979 to 1982 until the tournament moved to the Cypress Creek Country Club in 1983. The event was dropped from the LPGA schedule altogether after the 1984 tour season. Plaques commemorating winners of both tournaments and other course record-holders sit just outside the club's pro-shop.

== Scorecard ==
Rio Pinar Country Club
Tee	Rating/Slope	1	2	3	4	5	6	7	8	9	Out	10	11	12	13	14	15	16	17	18	In	Total
Black	79.3 / 130	569	380	414	194	391	410	566	213	422	3559	507	420	165	385	412	515	221	355	429	3409	6968
Gold	72.2 / 127	538	369	407	180	358	399	549	171	409	3380	484	398	151	359	388	490	197	342	401	3210	6590
Blue	70.4 / 125	520	353	391	159	344	384	533	152	389	3225	458	373	135	338	359	468	180	324	383	3018	6243
White	67.0 / 117	457	304	309	154	329	328	477	136	365	2859	424	339	100	308	299	418	163	280	307	2638	5497
SI	Men's	1	3	11	15	13	7	5	17	9		6	12	14	16	10	2	18	8	4
Par		5	4	4	3	4	4	5	3	4	36	5	4	3	4	4	5	3	4	4	36	72
SI	Ladies'	1	3	11	15	13	7	5	17	9		6	12	14	16	10	2	18	8	4
Blue	76.2 / 135	520	353	391	159	344	384	533	152	389	3225	458	373	135	338	359	468	180	324	383	3018	6243
White	72.0 / 128	457	304	309	154	329	328	477	136	365	2859	424	339	100	308	299	418	163	280	307	2638	5497
Red	71.0 / 125	453	300	304	141	315	324	473	129	352	2791	412	326	96	295	290	401	149	270	294	2533	5324

== Tour winners ==
=== PGA Tour ===
Year	Player	Country	Score	To par	Winner's share ($)	Purse ($)
Florida Citrus Open
1978	Mac McLendon	United States	271	−17	40,000	200,000
1977	Gary Koch	United States	274	−14	40,000	200,000
1976	Hale Irwin	United States	270	−18	40,000	200,000
1975	Lee Trevino	United States	276	−12	40,000	200,000
1974	Jerry Heard (2)	United States	273	−15	30,000	150,000
1973	Buddy Allin	United States	265	−23	30,000	150,000
1972	Jerry Heard	United States	276	−12	30,000	150,000
Florida Citrus Invitational
1971	Arnold Palmer	United States	270	−18	30,000	150,000
1970	Bob Lunn	United States	271	−17	30,000	150,000
Florida Citrus Open Invitational
1969	Ken Still	United States	278	−10	23,000	115,000
1968	Dan Sikes	United States	274	−14	23,000	115,000
1967	Julius Boros	United States	274	−10	23,000	115,000
1966	Lionel Hebert	United States	279	−5	21,000	110,000

Note: Green highlight indicates scoring records.

=== LPGA Tour ===
Year	Player	Country	Score	To par	Winner's share ($)	Purse ($)
Orlando Lady Classic
1982	Patty Sheehan	United States	209	−7	22,500	150,000
Florida Lady Citrus
1981	Beth Daniel	United States	281	−7	15,000	100,000
1980	Donna White	United States	283	−9	15,000	100,000
1979	Jane Blalock	United States	286	−6	15,000	100,000
