= Cobbtown, Florida =

- Unincorporated community
- Location within Florida Location within the United States
- Coordinates: 30°52′59″N 87°07′11″W
- Country: United States
- State: Florida
- County: Santa Rosa

Area
  - Total: 2.651 sq mi (6.87 km^{2})
  - Land: 2.635 sq mi (6.82 km^{2})
  - Water: 0.016 sq mi (0.041 km^{2})
- Elevation: 180 ft (55 m)

Population (2020)
  - Total: 78
  - Density: 30/sq mi (11/km^{2})
- Time zone: UTC-6 (Central (CST))
  - Summer (DST): UTC-5 (CDT)
- Area code: 850
- GNIS feature ID: 294719

Cobbtown is an unincorporated community and census-designated place in Santa Rosa County, Florida, United States. Its population was 78 at the 2020 census, up from 67 at the 2010 census. It is part of the Pensacola—Ferry Pass—Brent, Florida Metropolitan Statistical Area.

== Geography ==
According to the U.S. Census Bureau, the community has an area of 2.651 square miles (6.87 km^{2}); 2.635 square miles (6.82 km^{2}) of its area is land, and 0.016 square miles (0.041 km^{2}) is water.

== Demographics ==
Cobbtown first appeared as a census designated place in the 2010 U.S. census.
