= Mount Plymouth, Florida =

- Census-designated place
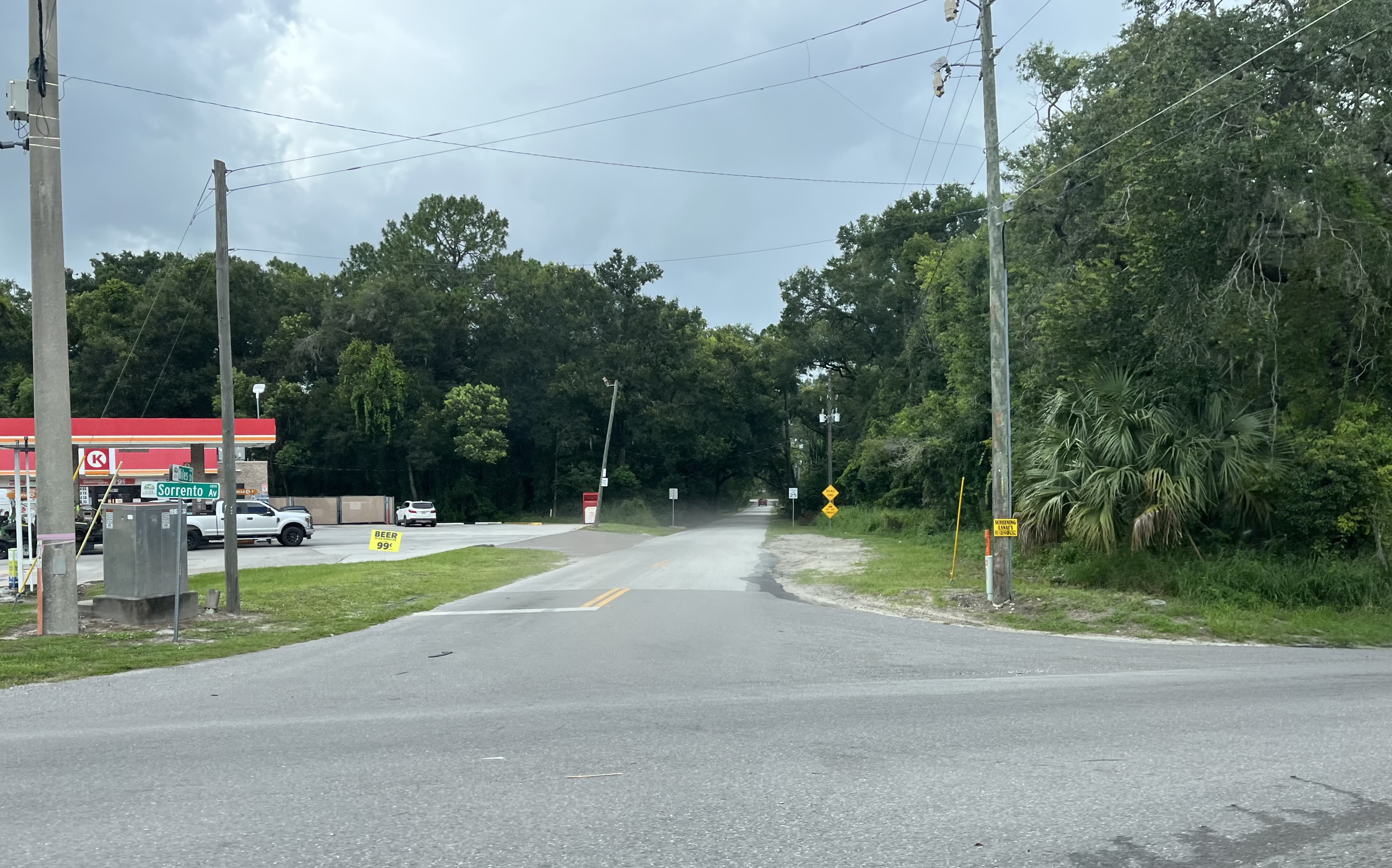

- Location in Lake County and the state of Florida
- Coordinates: 28°48′09″N 81°32′06″W
- Country: United States
- State: Florida
- County: Lake

Area
  - Total: 3.02 sq mi (7.83 km^{2})
  - Land: 2.88 sq mi (7.45 km^{2})
  - Water: 0.15 sq mi (0.38 km^{2})
- Elevation: 79 ft (24 m)

Population (2020)
  - Total: 4,417
  - Density: 1,535.3/sq mi (592.77/km^{2})
- Time zone: UTC−5 (Eastern (EST))
  - Summer (DST): UTC−4 (EDT)
- ZIP code: 32776
- Area code: 352
- FIPS code: 12-47125
- GNIS feature ID: 2403311

Mount Plymouth is an unincorporated community and census-designated place (CDP) in Lake County, Florida, United States. As of the 2020 census, Mount Plymouth had a population of 4,417. It is part of the Orlando–Kissimmee Metropolitan Statistical Area.

== History ==
The focal point of a golf resort for the region was the Historic Mount Plymouth Hotel, which was constructed in 1926 at a cost of $350,000. The hotel became a center of activity in the area. Guests such as Al Capone, Connie Mack, Babe Ruth and Kate Smith were able to utilize the hotel's airfield for arrival.

Four 18-hole golf courses patterned after the St. Andrews course in Scotland were originally planned for the resort. However, the Florida real estate crash of 1926 prevented completion of three of the four courses. The first course, called Mount Plymouth Golf Club, closed in 2007. Lucia Mida would use Mount Plymouth as her temporary place of residence while participating in Florida state golfing tournaments.

In 1959, Florida Central Academy occupied the building and grounds of the 150-room hotel. Originally a boys boarding school, in 1971 the academy began accepting girls. The school remained operational until June 1983. The building, condemned by county health officials, quickly became the target of vandals. In 1986 and 1987, fire destroyed the building.

Mount Plymouth was developed during the Florida land boom of the 1920s as a planned golf resort community centered around the Mount Plymouth Hotel and Country Club. The area was designed to attract tourists and seasonal residents, with amenities including golf facilities, recreational spaces, and residential cottages built around the resort.

== Geography ==
Mount Plymouth is located in eastern Lake County. It is bordered to the south by the city of Apopka in Orange County. Florida State Road 46 passes through the center of the community, leading east 17 miles (27 km) to Sanford and west 7 miles (11 km) to Mount Dora. Tavares, the Lake county seat, is 12 miles (19 km) west of Mount Plymouth. Florida State Road 429, the Wekiva Parkway, passes east and south of Mount Plymouth, leading south around the west side of the Orlando area 42 miles (68 km) to Interstate 4.

According to the United States Census Bureau, the Mount Plymouth CDP has a total area of 3.1 square miles (7.9 km^{2}), of which 2.9 square miles (7.5 km^{2}) are land and 0.2 square miles (0.4 km^{2}), or 4.91%, are water.

=== Climate ===
Climate data for Mount Plymouth, Florida, 1991–2020 normals, extremes 2002–present
Month	Jan	Feb	Mar	Apr	May	Jun	Jul	Aug	Sep	Oct	Nov	Dec	Year
Record high °F (°C)	86 (30)	89 (32)	92 (33)	96 (36)	99 (37)	100 (38)	99 (37)	99 (37)	98 (37)	96 (36)	91 (33)	87 (31)	100 (38)
Mean maximum °F (°C)	83.6 (28.7)	85.0 (29.4)	88.5 (31.4)	92.2 (33.4)	95.6 (35.3)	97.6 (36.4)	96.8 (36.0)	96.8 (36.0)	95.3 (35.2)	92.3 (33.5)	87.7 (30.9)	85.1 (29.5)	98.2 (36.8)
Mean daily maximum °F (°C)	70.8 (21.6)	74.0 (23.3)	79.1 (26.2)	83.3 (28.5)	88.5 (31.4)	90.8 (32.7)	92.5 (33.6)	92.3 (33.5)	90.0 (32.2)	84.4 (29.1)	78.1 (25.6)	72.9 (22.7)	83.1 (28.4)
Daily mean °F (°C)	57.6 (14.2)	60.5 (15.8)	64.4 (18.0)	69.7 (20.9)	76.0 (24.4)	80.9 (27.2)	82.7 (28.2)	82.4 (28.0)	80.2 (26.8)	73.5 (23.1)	66.3 (19.1)	60.7 (15.9)	71.3 (21.8)
Mean daily minimum °F (°C)	44.4 (6.9)	47.1 (8.4)	49.7 (9.8)	56.2 (13.4)	63.6 (17.6)	70.9 (21.6)	73.0 (22.8)	72.6 (22.6)	70.4 (21.3)	62.5 (16.9)	54.6 (12.6)	48.6 (9.2)	59.4 (15.2)
Mean minimum °F (°C)	26.3 (−3.2)	27.7 (−2.4)	33.9 (1.1)	43.5 (6.4)	51.9 (11.1)	63.2 (17.3)	67.6 (19.8)	69.1 (20.6)	62.1 (16.7)	46.4 (8.0)	35.9 (2.2)	31.3 (−0.4)	24.3 (−4.3)
Record low °F (°C)	16 (−9)	19 (−7)	26 (−3)	30 (−1)	45 (7)	57 (14)	65 (18)	63 (17)	54 (12)	32 (0)	28 (−2)	15 (−9)	15 (−9)
Average precipitation inches (mm)	2.82 (72)	2.47 (63)	3.17 (81)	2.67 (68)	4.43 (113)	8.33 (212)	7.34 (186)	8.48 (215)	6.30 (160)	3.72 (94)	2.04 (52)	2.53 (64)	54.30 (1,379)
Source: NOAA (mean maxima/minima 2006–2020)

== Demographics ==
Historical population
Census	Pop.	Note	%±
2020	4,417		—
U.S. Decennial Census

=== 2020 census ===
As of the 2020 census, Mount Plymouth had a population of 4,417. The median age was 40.2 years. 22.3% of residents were under the age of 18 and 16.3% of residents were 65 years of age or older. For every 100 females there were 99.6 males, and for every 100 females age 18 and over there were 98.5 males age 18 and over.

97.5% of residents lived in urban areas, while 2.5% lived in rural areas.

There were 1,666 households in Mount Plymouth, of which 30.7% had children under the age of 18 living in them. Of all households, 51.4% were married-couple households, 19.0% were households with a male householder and no spouse or partner present, and 20.8% were households with a female householder and no spouse or partner present. About 22.1% of all households were made up of individuals and 9.8% had someone living alone who was 65 years of age or older.

There were 1,763 housing units, of which 5.5% were vacant. The homeowner vacancy rate was 1.9% and the rental vacancy rate was 3.4%.

Racial composition as of the 2020 census
Race	Number	Percent
White	3,468	78.5%
Black or African American	180	4.1%
American Indian and Alaska Native	22	0.5%
Asian	36	0.8%
Native Hawaiian and Other Pacific Islander	3	0.1%
Some other race	212	4.8%
Two or more races	496	11.2%
Hispanic or Latino (of any race)	637	14.4%

=== 2010 census ===
As of the 2010 census, there were 4,011 people, 1,080 households, and 811 families residing in the CDP. The population density was 1,010.8 inhabitants per square mile (390.3/km^{2}). There were 1,171 housing units at an average density of 420.6 per square mile (162.4/km^{2}). The racial makeup of the CDP was 88.33% White, 5.06% African American, 0.92% Native American, 0.62% Asian, 0.18% Pacific Islander, 2.84% from other races, and 2.22% from two or more races. Hispanic or Latino of any race were 9.37% of the population.

There were 1,080 households, out of which 33.1% had children under the age of 18 living with them, 62.5% were married couples living together, 8.5% had a female householder with no husband present, and 24.9% were non-families. 18.5% of all households were made up of individuals, and 7.7% had someone living alone who was 65 years of age or older. The average household size was 2.61 and the average family size was 2.97.

In the CDP, the age distribution of the population shows 25.2% under the age of 18, 6.2% from 18 to 24, 30.8% from 25 to 44, 24.1% from 45 to 64, and 13.8% who were 65 years of age or older. The median age was 39 years. For every 100 females, there were 95.0 males. For every 100 females age 18 and over, there were 92.8 males.

The median income for a household in the CDP was $42,530, and the median income for a family was $45,089. Males had a median income of $31,324 versus $21,621 for females. The per capita income for the CDP was $17,182. About 2.1% of families and 6.6% of the population were below the poverty line, including 1.8% of those under age 18 and 7.8% of those age 65 or over.

== Notable person ==
- Nancy Walters, actress
