= Mulat, Florida =

- Unincorporated community
- Location within Florida Location within the United States
- Coordinates: 30°33′05″N 87°07′24″W
- Country: United States
- State: Florida
- County: Santa Rosa

Area
  - Total: 1.675 sq mi (4.34 km^{2})
  - Land: 1.574 sq mi (4.08 km^{2})
  - Water: 0.101 sq mi (0.26 km^{2})
- Elevation: 10 ft (3.0 m)

Population (2020)
  - Total: 322
  - Density: 205/sq mi (79.0/km^{2})
- Time zone: UTC-6 (Central (CST))
  - Summer (DST): UTC-5 (CDT)
- ZIP code: 32583
- Area code: 850
- GNIS feature ID: 295471

Mulat is an unincorporated community and census-designated place in Santa Rosa County, Florida, United States. Its population was 322 at the 2020 census, up from 259 at the 2010 census. It is part of the Pensacola metropolitan area.

== History ==
Mulat is possibly the oldest human settlement in Santa Rosa County. The area was originally inhabited as early as the 4th Century by the Santa Rosa-Swift Creek people. It is believed that the Santa Rosa-Swift Creek people lived in the area until the 7th Century, when they were overtaken by people of the Weeden Island Culture.

The first European in Mulat was Beltran Suchet, who settled on the Mulatto Bayou (then called the Governor's River) with his family and slaves in 1818. He had multiple properties in Pensacola, included the "Last stuccoed brick Gulf Coast Creole High House in Pensacola". Suchet is believed to have had children with one of his slaves, hence the name, Mulat. Suchet moved to Havana, Cuba in 1821.

Captain John Gardner built a shipyard on the Mulatto Bayou in the late 1820s. A sawmill was built on the bayou in the 1850s, followed by John McLean's lumberyard. A ferry was established in 1854 to Ferry Pass, as well as a road to Arcadia Mill. Dr. William Judge built a steampowered sawmill shortly before the Civil War.

The fledgling town was burned down by the Confederates on March 12, 1862. Mulat never recovered. Richard Duvall came to Mulat in 1877, building a sawmill. A trestle bridge to Mulat was built in 1882, connecting Escambia and Santa Rosa counties. A post office was established in Mulat in 1892, which served the community until 1953.

Simeon Otis bought Richard Duvall's mill and home in 1899. Otis built a shingle mill and grew oranges. Will Washington, grandson of the Sheriff of the same name, established a turpentine mill in the 1920s. The McMillans, including Mary McMillan, a missionary who later taught at Fukuoka Jo Gakuin University, moved to Mulat in 1938. Mary moved to Hiroshima in 1939, but left in 1941. She returned after the Atomic Bombings of Hiroshima in 1945 and helped children in the area.

== Geography ==
According to the U.S. Census Bureau, the community has an area of 1.675 square miles (4.34 km^{2}); 1.574 square miles (4.08 km^{2}) of its area is land, and 0.101 square miles (0.26 km^{2}) is water.

== Demographics ==
Mulat first appeared as a census designated place in the 2010 U.S. census.
