= Browardale, Florida =

Browerdale, Florida
- Former census-designated place
- Country: United States
- State: Florida
- County: Broward

Population (1990)
  - Total: 6,257
- Time zone: UTC-5 (Eastern (EST))
  - Summer (DST): UTC-4 (EDT)

Browardale was a census-designated place (CDP) in Broward County, Florida, United States. The population was 6,257 at the 1990 census.

== Demographics ==
Historical population
Census	Pop.	Note	%±
1970	17,444		—
1980	7,571		−56.6%
1990	6,257		−17.4%
U.S. Decennial Census

Browardale was first listed as an unincorporated place in the 1970 U.S. census; and listed as a census designated place in the 1980 U.S. census and 1990 U.S. census. The CDP was split into the Broward Estates CDP and the St. George CDP prior to the 2000 U.S. census.
