= Pine Lakes, Florida =

- Census-designated place
- Location in Lake County and the state of Florida
- Coordinates: 28°56′21″N 81°25′51″W
- Country: United States
- State: Florida
- County: Lake

Area
  - Total: 1.71 sq mi (4.44 km^{2})
  - Land: 1.60 sq mi (4.15 km^{2})
  - Water: 0.11 sq mi (0.29 km^{2})
- Elevation: 52 ft (16 m)

Population (2020)
  - Total: 818
  - Density: 510.8/sq mi (197.21/km^{2})
- Time zone: UTC-5 (Eastern (EST))
  - Summer (DST): UTC-4 (EDT)
- ZIP code: 32736
- Area code: 352
- FIPS code: 12-56865
- GNIS feature ID: 2403415

Pine Lakes is an unincorporated community and census-designated place (CDP) in Lake County, Florida, United States. As of the 2020 census, Pine Lakes had a population of 818. It is part of the Orlando–Kissimmee Metropolitan Statistical Area.

== Geography ==
Pine Lakes is located in northeastern Lake County. The CDP includes the communities of Pine Lakes, South Pine Lakes, and Florida Hills.

Florida State Road 44 passes through Pine Lakes, leading northeast 10 miles (16 km) to DeLand and southwest 17 miles (27 km) to Mount Dora.

According to the United States Census Bureau, the CDP has a total area of 1.7 square miles (4.4 km^{2}), of which 1.6 square miles (4.1 km^{2}) are land and 0.1 square miles (0.3 km^{2}), or 6.48%, are water. There are at least eight named lakes in the CDP, the largest being Pine Lake and Crystal Lake.

== Demographics ==
Historical population
Census	Pop.	Note	%±
2020	818		—
U.S. Decennial Census

As of the census of 2000, there were 755 people, 282 households, and 205 families residing in the CDP. The population density was 486.9 inhabitants per square mile (188.0/km^{2}). There were 345 housing units at an average density of 222.5 per square mile (85.9/km^{2}). The racial makeup of the CDP was 96.95% White, 0.93% African American, 0.40% Native American, 0.13% Asian, 0.93% Pacific Islander, 0.40% from other races, and 0.26% from two or more races. Hispanic or Latino of any race were 2.78% of the population.

There were 282 households, out of which 34.4% had children under the age of 18 living with them, 48.9% were married couples living together, 13.5% had a female householder with no husband present, and 27.0% were non-families. 20.6% of all households were made up of individuals, and 10.3% had someone living alone who was 65 years of age or older. The average household size was 2.68 and the average family size was 2.94.

In the CDP, the population was spread out, with 27.9% under the age of 18, 8.3% from 18 to 24, 27.5% from 25 to 44, 22.1% from 45 to 64, and 14.0% who were 65 years of age or older. The median age was 36 years. For every 100 females, there were 106.3 males. For every 100 females age 18 and over, there were 104.5 males.

The median income for a household in the CDP was $28,333, and the median income for a family was $26,250. Males had a median income of $28,194 versus $23,889 for females. The per capita income for the CDP was $11,232. About 29.5% of families and 32.4% of the population were below the poverty line, including 55.9% of those under age 18 and 15.2% of those age 65 or over.
