= Hillsboro Pines, Florida =

- CDP
- Interactive map of Hillsboro Pines, Florida
- Coordinates: 26°19′31″N 80°11′41″W
- Country: United States
- State: Florida
- County: Broward

Area
  - Total: 0.22 sq mi (0.56 km^{2})
  - Land: 0.21 sq mi (0.55 km^{2})
  - Water: 0.0039 sq mi (0.01 km^{2})
- Elevation: 16 ft (4.9 m)

Population (2020)
  - Total: 496
  - Density: 2,355.3/sq mi (909.38/km^{2})
- Time zone: UTC-5 (Eastern (EST))
  - Summer (DST): UTC-4 (EDT)
- ZIP code: 33073
- Area codes: 754 and 954
- FIPS code: 12-30858
- GNIS ID: 2402589

Hillsboro Pines is a census-designated place (CDP) in Broward County, Florida, United States. The population was 496 at the 2020 census.

== Geography ==
According to the United States Census Bureau, the CDP has a total area of 0.6 km^{2} (0.23 sq mi), all land.

== Demographics ==
Historical population
Census	Pop.	Note	%±
2000	406		—
2010	446		9.9%
2020	496		11.2%
U.S. Decennial Census

=== 2020 census ===
Hillsboro Pines racial composition (Hispanics excluded from racial categories) (NH = Non-Hispanic)
Race	Number	Percentage
White (NH)	341	68.75%
Black or African American (NH)	19	3.83%
Native American or Alaska Native (NH)	0	0.00%
Asian (NH)	12	2.42%
Pacific Islander or Native Hawaiian (NH)	0	0.00%
Some other race (NH)	12	2.42%
Two or more races/Multiracial (NH)	46	9.27%
Hispanic or Latino (any race)	66	13.31%
Total	496	100.00%

As of the 2020 United States census, there were 496 people, 173 households, and 118 families residing in the CDP.

=== 2010 census ===
Hillsboro Pines Demographics
2010 Census	Hillsboro Pines	Broward County	Florida
Total population	446	1,748,066	18,801,310
Population, percent change, 2000 to 2010	+9.9%	+7.7%	+17.6%
Population density	2,787.5/sq mi	1,444.9/sq mi	350.6/sq mi
White or Caucasian (including White Hispanic)	93.9%	63.1%	75.0%
(Non-Hispanic White or Caucasian)	83.6%	43.5%	57.9%
Black or African-American	5.2%	26.7%	16.0%
Hispanic or Latino (of any race)	10.3%	25.1%	22.5%
Asian	0.4%	3.2%	2.4%
Native American or Native Alaskan	0.0%	0.3%	0.4%
Pacific Islander or Native Hawaiian	0.0%	0.1%	0.1%
Two or more races (Multiracial)	0.0%	2.9%	2.5%
Some Other Race	0.4%	3.7%	3.6%

As of the 2010 United States census, there were 446 people, 115 households, and 70 families residing in the CDP.

=== 2000 census ===
As of the census of 2000, there were 406 people, 145 households, and 118 families living in the CDP. The population density was 712.5 people/km^{2} (1,845 people/mi^{2}). There were 147 housing units at an average density of 258.0 units/km^{2} (668 units/mi^{2}). The racial makeup of the CDP was 94.83% White (91.6% were Non-Hispanic White), 2.22% African American, 0.49% Asian, 0.99% Pacific Islander, 0.99% from other races, and 0.49% from two or more races. Hispanic or Latino of any race were 4.68% of the population.

In 2000, there were 145 households, out of which 38.6% had children under the age of 18 living with them, 69.0% were married couples living together, 6.2% had a female householder with no husband present, and 18.6% were non-families. 13.8% of all households were made up of individuals, and 2.1% had someone living alone who was 65 years of age or older. The average household size was 2.80 and the average family size was 2.99.

In 2000, in the CDP, the population was spread out, with 24.1% under the age of 18, 5.7% from 18 to 24, 39.2% from 25 to 44, 24.4% from 45 to 64, and 6.7% who were 65 years of age or older. The median age was 37 years. For every 100 females, there were 107.1 males. For every 100 females age 18 and over, there were 108.1 males.

In 2000, the median income for a household in the CDP was $70,938, and the median income for a family was $70,313. Males had a median income of $45,458 versus $25,819 for females. The per capita income for the CDP was $32,908. None of the families and 1.6% of the population were living below the poverty line, including no under eighteens and none of those over 64.

As of 2000, English was the first language for 100% of the population.
