= Broward Estates, Lauderhill, Florida =

Broward Estates, Florida
- neighborhood
- Interactive map of Broward Estates, Florida
- Coordinates: 26°7′31″N 80°11′48″W
- Country: United States
- State: Florida
- County: Broward

Area
  - Total: 0.50 sq mi (1.3 km^{2})
  - Land: 0.50 sq mi (1.3 km^{2})
  - Water: 0 sq mi (0.0 km^{2})
- Elevation: 3.3 ft (1 m)

Population (2000)
  - Total: 3,416
  - Density: 6,611/sq mi (2,552.7/km^{2})
- Time zone: UTC-5 (Eastern (EST))
  - Summer (DST): UTC-4 (EDT)
- FIPS code: 12-08880
- GNIS feature ID: 1853237

Broward Estates was a census-designated place (CDP) in Broward County, Florida, United States. The population was 3,416 at the 2000 census. It now a neighborhood of Lauderhill. Residents of this neighborhood often refer to their neighborhood as "Parkway" as well, as it also contains Parkway Middle School.

== Geography ==
Broward Estates is located at 26°7′31″N 80°11′48″W (26.125404, -80.196559).

According to the United States Census Bureau, the CDP has a total area of 1.3 km^{2} (0.50 sq mi), all land.

== Demographics ==
Broward Estates first appeared as a census designated place in the 2000 U.S. census created from part of Browardale CDP. The CDP was annexed to the city of annexed to the city of Lauderhill prior to the 2010 U.S. census.

Broward Estates CDP, Florida – Racial and ethnic composition Note: the US Census treats Hispanic/Latino as an ethnic category. This table excludes Latinos from the racial categories and assigns them to a separate category. Hispanics/Latinos may be of any race.
| Race / Ethnicity (NH = Non-Hispanic) | Pop 2000 | 2000 |
|---|---|---|
| White alone (NH) | 19 | 0.56% |
| Black or African American alone (NH) | 3,288 | 96.25% |
| Native American or Alaska Native alone (NH) | 1 | 0.03% |
| Asian alone (NH) | 10 | 0.29% |
| Native Hawaiian or Pacific Islander alone (NH) | 0 | 0.00% |
| Other race alone (NH) | 4 | 0.12% |
| Mixed race or Multiracial (NH) | 52 | 1.52% |
| Hispanic or Latino (any race) | 42 | 1.23% |
| Total | 3,416 | 100.00% |

As of the census of 2000, there were 3,416 people, 993 households, and 831 families residing in the CDP. The population density was 2,536.4 people/km^{2} (6,569 people/mi^{2}). There were 1,025 housing units at an average density of 761.1 units/km^{2} (1,971 units/mi^{2}). The racial makeup of the CDP was 0.82% White, 96.96% African American, 0.03% Native American, 0.29% Asian, 0.32% from other races, and 1.58% from two or more races. Hispanic or Latino of any race were 1.23% of the population.

There were 993 households, out of which 28.6% had children under the age of 18 living with them, 43.1% were married couples living together, 32.6% had a female householder with no husband present, and 16.3% were non-families. 12.3% of all households were made up of individuals, and 4.3% had someone living alone who was 65 years of age or older. The average household size was 3.43 and the average family size was 3.70.

In the CDP, the population was spread out, with 31.7% under the age of 18, 7.6% from 18 to 24, 24.2% from 25 to 44, 25.4% from 45 to 64, and 11.1% who were 65 years of age or older. The median age was 34 years. For every 100 females, there were 87.6 males. For every 100 females age 18 and over, there were 82.7 males.

The median income for a household in the CDP was $37,298, and the median income for a family was $38,712. Males had a median income of $26,726 versus $24,360 for females. The per capita income for the CDP was $12,471. About 23.3% of families and 23.2% of the population were below the poverty line, including 28.9% of those under age 18 and 25.5% of those age 65 or over.

As of 2000, English as a first language accounted for 98.31% of all residents, while Spanish made up 1.68% of the population.
