= North DeLand, Florida =

- CDP
- Location in Volusia County and the state of Florida
- Coordinates: 29°02′54″N 81°17′48″W
- Country: United States
- State: Florida
- County: Volusia

Area
  - Total: 0.53 sq mi (1.36 km^{2})
  - Land: 0.53 sq mi (1.36 km^{2})
  - Water: 0 sq mi (0.00 km^{2})
- Elevation: 85 ft (26 m)

Population (2020)
  - Total: 1,510
  - Density: 2,878.9/sq mi (1,111.55/km^{2})
- Time zone: UTC-5 (Eastern (EST))
  - Summer (DST): UTC-4 (EDT)
- ZIP code: 32724
- Area code: 386
- FIPS code: 12-49275
- GNIS feature ID: 2403347

North DeLand is a census-designated place (CDP) in Volusia County, Florida, United States. The population was 1,510 at the 2020 census.

== Geography ==
According to the United States Census Bureau, the CDP has a total area of 0.54 square miles (1.4 km^{2}), all land.

== Demographics ==
Historical population
Census	Pop.	Note	%±
2020	1,510		—
U.S. Decennial Census

=== 2020 census ===
As of the 2020 census, North DeLand had a population of 1,510.

The median age was 41.9 years. 19.3% of residents were under the age of 18 and 17.5% of residents were 65 years of age or older. For every 100 females, there were 96.6 males, and for every 100 females age 18 and over, there were 96.6 males age 18 and over.

There were 606 households in North DeLand, of which 23.4% had children under the age of 18 living in them. Of all households, 38.9% were married-couple households, 23.4% were households with a male householder and no spouse or partner present, and 29.7% were households with a female householder and no spouse or partner present. About 29.5% of all households were made up of individuals and 12.6% had someone living alone who was 65 years of age or older.

There were 680 housing units, of which 10.9% were vacant. The homeowner vacancy rate was 1.8% and the rental vacancy rate was 16.8%.

100.0% of residents lived in urban areas, while 0.0% lived in rural areas.

Racial composition as of the 2020 census
Race	Number	Percent
White	1,062	70.3%
Black or African American	93	6.2%
American Indian and Alaska Native	14	0.9%
Asian	30	2.0%
Native Hawaiian and Other Pacific Islander	0	0.0%
Some other race	166	11.0%
Two or more races	145	9.6%
Hispanic or Latino (of any race)	330	21.9%

=== 2000 census ===
As of the 2000 census, there were 1,327 people, 532 households, and 347 families residing in the CDP. The population density was 868.4/km^{2} (2,253.7/mi^{2}). There were 563 housing units at an average density of 368.4/km^{2} (956.2/mi^{2}). The racial makeup of the CDP was 90.96% White, 2.56% African American, 0.68% Native American, 1.73% Asian, 2.11% from other races, and 1.96% from two or more races. Hispanic or Latino of any race were 7.69% of the population.

There were 532 households, out of which 29.3% had children under the age of 18 living with them, 43.0% were married couples living together, 16.0% had a female householder with no husband present, and 34.6% were non-families. 26.3% of all households were made up of individuals, and 11.7% had someone living alone who was 65 years of age or older. The average household size was 2.49 and the average family size was 2.99.

In the CDP, the population was spread out, with 25.8% under the age of 18, 7.8% from 18 to 24, 28.3% from 25 to 44, 22.1% from 45 to 64, and 16.1% who were 65 years of age or older. The median age was 37 years. For every 100 females, there were 95.7 males. For every 100 females age 18 and over, there were 86.0 males.

The median income for a household in the CDP was $30,288, and the median income for a family was $44,583. Males had a median income of $29,408 versus $28,542 for females. The per capita income for the CDP was $17,489. About 7.4% of families and 11.8% of the population were below the poverty line, including 16.9% of those under age 18 and none of those age 65 or over.
