= Quail Ridge, Florida =

- Unincorporated community
- Location within Florida Location within the United States
- Coordinates: 28°20′42″N 82°33′12″W
- Country: United States
- State: Florida
- County: Pasco

Area
  - Total: 4.639 sq mi (12.01 km^{2})
  - Land: 4.156 sq mi (10.76 km^{2})
  - Water: 0.483 sq mi (1.25 km^{2})
- Elevation: 52 ft (16 m)

Population (2010)
  - Total: 1,040
  - Density: 250/sq mi (96.6/km^{2})
- Time zone: UTC-5 (Eastern (EST))
  - Summer (DST): UTC-4 (EDT)
- Area code: 352
- GNIS feature ID: 2583377

Quail Ridge is an unincorporated community and census-designated place in Pasco County, Florida, United States. As of the 2020 census, Quail Ridge had a population of 2,195.

== Geography ==
According to the U.S. Census Bureau, the community has an area of 4.639 square miles (12.01 km^{2}); 4.156 square miles (10.76 km^{2}) of its area is land, and 0.483 square miles (1.25 km^{2}) is water.

== Demographics ==
Quail Ridge first appeared as a census designated place in the 2010 U.S. census.

=== 2020 census ===
As of the 2020 census, Quail Ridge had a population of 2,195. The median age was 37.4 years. 26.1% of residents were under the age of 18 and 12.3% of residents were 65 years of age or older. For every 100 females there were 97.9 males, and for every 100 females age 18 and over there were 97.4 males age 18 and over.

100.0% of residents lived in urban areas, while 0.0% lived in rural areas.

There were 770 households in Quail Ridge, of which 39.2% had children under the age of 18 living in them. Of all households, 58.2% were married-couple households, 16.2% were households with a male householder and no spouse or partner present, and 19.2% were households with a female householder and no spouse or partner present. About 18.2% of all households were made up of individuals and 6.0% had someone living alone who was 65 years of age or older.

There were 819 housing units, of which 6.0% were vacant. The homeowner vacancy rate was 2.1% and the rental vacancy rate was 8.0%.

Racial composition as of the 2020 census
Race	Number	Percent
White	1,556	70.9%
Black or African American	132	6.0%
American Indian and Alaska Native	6	0.3%
Asian	68	3.1%
Native Hawaiian and Other Pacific Islander	1	0.0%
Some other race	102	4.6%
Two or more races	330	15.0%
Hispanic or Latino (of any race)	497	22.6%
