= Brownsdale, Florida =

- Unincorporated community
- Location within Florida Location within the United States
- Coordinates: 30°52′47″N 87°14′20″W
- Country: United States
- State: Florida
- County: Santa Rosa

Area
  - Total: 8.892 sq mi (23.03 km^{2})
  - Land: 8.700 sq mi (22.53 km^{2})
  - Water: 0.192 sq mi (0.50 km^{2})
- Elevation: 243 ft (74 m)

Population (2020)
  - Total: 528
  - Density: 60.7/sq mi (23.4/km^{2})
- Time zone: UTC-6 (Central (CST))
  - Summer (DST): UTC-5 (CDT)
- ZIP code: 32565
- Area code: 850
- GNIS feature ID: 2583333

Brownsdale is an unincorporated community and census-designated place in Santa Rosa County, Florida, United States. Its population was 528 at the 2020 census, up from 471 at the 2010 census. It is part of the Pensacola—Ferry Pass—Brent, Florida Metropolitan Statistical Area.

== Geography ==
According to the U.S. Census Bureau, the community has an area of 8.892 square miles (23.03 km^{2}); 8.700 square miles (22.53 km^{2}) of its area is land, and 0.192 square miles (0.50 km^{2}) is water.

== Demographics ==
Historical population
Census	Pop.	Note	%±
2010	471		—
2020	528		12.1%
U.S. Decennial Census

Brownsdale first appeared as a census designated place in the 2010 U.S. census.

=== Racial and ethnic composition ===
Brownsdale CDP, Florida – Racial and ethnic composition Note: the US Census treats Hispanic/Latino as an ethnic category. This table excludes Latinos from the racial categories and assigns them to a separate category. Hispanics/Latinos may be of any race.
Race / Ethnicity (NH = Non-Hispanic)	Pop 2010	Pop 2020	% 2010	% 2020
White alone (NH)	450	504	95.54%	95.45%
Black or African American alone (NH)	1	1	0.21%	0.19%
Native American or Alaska Native alone (NH)	7	0	1.49%	0.00%
Asian alone (NH)	0	0	0.00%	0.00%
Native Hawaiian or Pacific Islander alone (NH)	0	0	0.00%	0.00%
Other race alone (NH)	0	1	0.00%	0.19%
Mixed race or Multiracial (NH)	4	20	0.85%	3.79%
Hispanic or Latino (any race)	9	2	1.91%	0.38%
Total	471	528	100.00%	100.00%
