= Desoto Lakes, Florida =

- Census-designated place
- Location in Sarasota County and the state of Florida
- Coordinates: 27°22′40″N 82°29′38″W
- Country: United States
- State: Florida
- County: Sarasota

Area
  - Total: 0.42 sq mi (1.10 km^{2})
  - Land: 0.41 sq mi (1.07 km^{2})
  - Water: 0.012 sq mi (0.03 km^{2})
- Elevation: 33 ft (10 m)

Population (2020)
  - Total: 2,137
  - Density: 5,157.4/sq mi (1,991.29/km^{2})
- Time zone: UTC-5 (Eastern (EST))
  - Summer (DST): UTC-4 (EDT)
- ZIP code: 34235
- Area code: 941
- FIPS code: 12-17300
- GNIS feature ID: 2402406

Desoto Lakes is a census-designated place (CDP) in Sarasota County, Florida, United States. The population was 2,137 at the 2020 US census, down from 3,646 at the 2010 US Census. It is part of the North Port–Bradenton–Sarasota, Florida Metropolitan Statistical Area.

== Geography ==
According to the United States Census Bureau, the CDP has a total area of 1.3 square miles (3.3 km^{2}), of which 1.2 square miles (3.2 km^{2}) is land and 0.04 square miles (0.1 km^{2}), or 2.87%, is water.

== Demographics ==
Historical population
Census	Pop.	Note	%±
1990	2,807		—
2000	3,198		13.9%
2010	3,646		14.0%
2020	2,137		−41.4%

=== 2020 census ===
As of the 2020 census, Desoto Lakes had a population of 2,137. The median age was 40.8 years. 21.3% of residents were under the age of 18 and 17.3% of residents were 65 years of age or older. For every 100 females there were 89.3 males, and for every 100 females age 18 and over there were 91.0 males age 18 and over.

100.0% of residents lived in urban areas, while 0.0% lived in rural areas.

There were 819 households in Desoto Lakes, of which 28.9% had children under the age of 18 living in them. Of all households, 44.4% were married-couple households, 19.9% were households with a male householder and no spouse or partner present, and 30.0% were households with a female householder and no spouse or partner present. About 24.6% of all households were made up of individuals and 8.7% had someone living alone who was 65 years of age or older.

There were 843 housing units, of which 2.8% were vacant. The homeowner vacancy rate was 1.0% and the rental vacancy rate was 0.0%.

Racial composition as of the 2020 census
Race	Number	Percent
White	1,356	63.5%
Black or African American	168	7.9%
American Indian and Alaska Native	21	1.0%
Asian	41	1.9%
Native Hawaiian and Other Pacific Islander	0	0.0%
Some other race	195	9.1%
Two or more races	356	16.7%
Hispanic or Latino (of any race)	572	26.8%

=== 2000 census ===
As of the 2000 US Census, there were 3,198 people, 1,290 households, and 939 families residing in the CDP. The population density was 2,537.0 inhabitants per square mile (979.5/km^{2}). There were 1,352 housing units at an average density of 1,072.5 per square mile (414.1/km^{2}). The racial makeup of the CDP was 93.50% White, 3.06% African American, 0.03% Native American, 1.03% Asian, 0.03% Pacific Islander, 0.84% from other races, and 1.50% from two or more races. Hispanic or Latino of any race were 4.35% of the population.

There were 1,290 households, out of which 27.5% had children under the age of 18 living with them, 61.5% were married couples living together, 8.0% had a female householder with no husband present, and 27.2% were non-families. 19.2% of all households were made up of individuals, and 7.4% had someone living alone who was 65 years of age or older. The average household size was 2.48 and the average family size was 2.83.

In the CDP, the population was spread out, with 20.5% under the age of 18, 4.7% from 18 to 24, 28.3% from 25 to 44, 29.5% from 45 to 64, and 16.9% who were 65 years of age or older. The median age was 43 years. For every 100 females, there were 92.4 males. For every 100 females age 18 and over, there were 91.3 males.

The median income for a household in the CDP was $52,719, and the median income for a family was $54,425. Males had a median income of $35,368 versus $26,920 for females. The per capita income for the CDP was $28,616. About 2.1% of families and 3.8% of the population were below the poverty line, including 6.4% of those under age 18 and 8.1% of those age 65 or over.
