= Riverland Village =

Riverland Village, Florida
- neighborhood
- Interactive map of Riverland Village, Florida
- Coordinates: 26°5′51″N 80°11′23″W
- Country: United States
- State: Florida
- County: Broward

Area
  - Total: 0.31 sq mi (0.8 km^{2})
  - Land: 0.31 sq mi (0.8 km^{2})
  - Water: 0 sq mi (0.0 km^{2})

Population (2000)
  - Total: 2,108
  - Density: 6,477/sq mi (2,500.8/km^{2})
- Time zone: UTC-5 (Eastern (EST))
  - Summer (DST): UTC-4 (EDT)
- FIPS code: 12-60750

Riverland Village is a former census-designated place in Broward County, Florida, United States. It was annexed to the city of Fort Lauderdale in 2002 and is currently classed as a neighborhood of the city. The population was 2,108 at the 2000 census.

== Geography ==
Riverland Village is located at 26°5′51″N 80°11′23″W (26.097365, -80.189700).

According to the United States Census Bureau, the neighborhood has a total area of 0.9 km^{2} (0.35 sq mi), all land.

== Demographics ==
Historical population
Census	Pop.	Note	%±
1970	5,512		—
1980	5,919		7.4%
1990	5,376		−9.2%
2000	2,108		−60.8%

As of the census of 2000, there were 2,108 people, 751 households, and 530 families residing in the neighborhood. The population density was 2,466.4 people/km^{2} (6,388 people/mi^{2}). There were 767 housing units at an average density of 897.4 units/km^{2} (2,324 units/mi^{2}). The racial makeup of the neighborhood was 86.72% White (68.2% were Non-Hispanic White,) 5.31% African American, 0.28% Native American, 1.33% Asian, 0.09% Pacific Islander, 4.46% from other races, and 1.80% from two or more races. Hispanic or Latino of any race were 24.72% of the population.

There were 751 households, out of which 32.8% had children under the age of 18 living with them, 52.7% were married couples living together, 11.9% had a female householder with no husband present, and 29.3% were non-families. 17.0% of all households were made up of individuals, and 5.6% had someone living alone who was 65 years of age or older. The average household size was 2.81 and the average family size was 3.18.

In the neighborhood, the population was spread out, with 23.0% under the age of 18, 6.3% from 18 to 24, 35.4% from 25 to 44, 24.8% from 45 to 64, and 10.6% who were 65 years of age or older. The median age was 37 years. For every 100 females, there were 104.5 males. For every 100 females age 18 and over, there were 104.3 males.

The median income for a household in the neighborhood was $50,263, and the median income for a family was $50,054. Males had a median income of $35,134 versus $30,862 for females. The per capita income for the neighborhood was $19,694. About 2.9% of families and 5.5% of the population were below the poverty line, including 7.0% of those under age 18 and 13.5% of those age 65 or over.

As of 2000, English as a first language accounted for 61.21% of all residents, while Spanish was at 36.84%, and German as a mother tongue made up 1.93% of the population.
