= Ravenswood Estates, Florida =

- neighborhood
- Interactive map of Ravenswood Estates, Florida
- Coordinates: 26°3′20″N 80°10′37″W
- Country: United States
- State: Florida
- County: Broward

Area
  - Total: 0.15 sq mi (0.4 km^{2})
  - Land: 0.15 sq mi (0.4 km^{2})
  - Water: 0 sq mi (0.0 km^{2})

Population (2000)
  - Total: 960
  - Density: 5,774/sq mi (2,229.2/km^{2})
- Time zone: UTC-5 (Eastern (EST))
  - Summer (DST): UTC-4 (EDT)
- FIPS code: 12-59587

Ravenswood Estates is a former census-designated place (CDP) in Broward County, Florida, United States. The population was 960 at the 2000 census. It is now a community located in Dania Beach, Florida.

== Geography ==
Ravenswood Estates is located at 26°3′20″N 80°10′37″W (26.055591, -80.176839).

According to the United States Census Bureau, the CDP has a total area of 0.4 km^{2} (0.15 sq mi), all land.

== Demographics ==
As of the census of 2000, there were 960 people, 434 households, and 279 families residing in the CDP. The population density was 2,180.3 people/km^{2} (5,647 people/mi^{2}). There were 588 housing units at an average density of 1,335.5 units/km^{2} (3,459 units/mi^{2}). The racial makeup of the CDP was 92.50% White (86.4% were Non-Hispanic White,) 2.08% African American, 0.10% Native American, 1.98% Asian, 1.25% from other races, and 2.08% from two or more races. Hispanic or Latino of any race were 7.50% of the population.

There were 434 households, out of which 21.2% had children under the age of 18 living with them, 50.7% were married couples living together, 9.7% had a female householder with no husband present, and 35.5% were non-families. 29.0% of all households were made up of individuals, and 14.3% had someone living alone who was 65 years of age or older. The average household size was 2.21 and the average family size was 2.69.

In the CDP, the population was spread out, with 17.9% under the age of 18, 5.3% from 18 to 24, 24.3% from 25 to 44, 28.9% from 45 to 64, and 23.6% who were 65 years of age or older. The median age was 46 years. For every 100 females, there were 92.8 males. For every 100 females age 18 and over, there were 93.6 males.

The median income for a household in the CDP was $38,824, and the median income for a family was $40,815. Males had a median income of $39,779 versus $27,656 for females. The per capita income for the CDP was $18,653. About 8.6% of families and 8.8% of the population were below the poverty line, including 12.2% of those under age 18 and 10.4% of those age 65 or over.

As of 2000, English as a first language accounted for 81.04% of all residents, while French made up 13.58%, and Spanish was the mother tongue of 5.36% of the population.
