= Watergate, Florida =

- CDP
- Location within Florida
- Coordinates: 26°20′09″N 80°12′46″W
- Country: United States
- State: Florida
- County: Palm Beach

Area
  - Total: 0.42 sq mi (1.08 km^{2})
  - Land: 0.42 sq mi (1.08 km^{2})
  - Water: 0 sq mi (0.00 km^{2})
- Elevation: 13 ft (4.0 m)

Population (2020)
  - Total: 3,459
  - Density: 8,316.5/sq mi (3,211.03/km^{2})
- Time zone: UTC-5 (Eastern (EST))
  - Summer (DST): UTC-4 (EDT)
- ZIP code: 33428
- Area codes: 561, 728
- GNIS feature ID: 2628537

Watergate is a census-designated place (CDP) in Palm Beach County, Florida, United States. It is part of the Miami metropolitan area of South Florida. The population was 3,459 as of the 2020 census.

== Geography ==
Watergate is located on the west side of U.S. Route 441, west of Boca Raton.

== Demographics ==
Historical population
Census	Pop.	Note	%±
2010	2,942		—
2020	3,459		17.6%
U.S. Decennial Census

Watergate first appeared as a census designated place in the 2010 U.S. census.

=== 2020 census ===
As of the 2020 census, Watergate had a population of 3,459. The median age was 37.3 years. 23.3% of residents were under the age of 18 and 11.5% of residents were 65 years of age or older. For every 100 females there were 99.0 males, and for every 100 females age 18 and over there were 95.9 males age 18 and over.

100.0% of residents lived in urban areas, while 0.0% lived in rural areas.

There were 1,097 households in Watergate, of which 41.8% had children under the age of 18 living in them. Of all households, 45.9% were married-couple households, 19.9% were households with a male householder and no spouse or partner present, and 25.3% were households with a female householder and no spouse or partner present. About 15.2% of all households were made up of individuals and 6.0% had someone living alone who was 65 years of age or older.

There were 1,135 housing units, of which 3.3% were vacant. The homeowner vacancy rate was 0.3% and the rental vacancy rate was 5.3%.

Watergate racial composition (Hispanics excluded from racial categories) (NH = Non-Hispanic)
Race	Number	Percentage
White (NH)	1,679	48.54%
Black or African American (NH)	182	5.26%
Native American or Alaska Native (NH)	8	0.23%
Asian (NH)	103	2.98%
Pacific Islander or Native Hawaiian (NH)	0	0.00%
Some Other Race (NH)	161	4.65%
Mixed/Multiracial (NH)	310	8.96%
Hispanic or Latino (any race)	1,016	29.37%
Total	3,459	

=== Demographic estimates ===
According to the 2020 ACS 5-year estimates, there were 716 families residing in the CDP.

=== 2010 census ===
Watergate racial composition (Hispanics excluded from racial categories) (NH = Non-Hispanic)
Race	Number	Percentage
White (NH)	2,064	70.16%
Black or African American (NH)	141	4.79%
Native American or Alaska Native (NH)	20	0.68%
Asian (NH)	46	1.56%
Pacific Islander or Native Hawaiian (NH)	0	0.00%
Some Other Race (NH)	31	1.05%
Mixed/Multiracial (NH)	48	1.63%
Hispanic or Latino (any race)	592	20.12%
Total	2,942	

As of the 2010 United States census, there were 2,942 people, 967 households, and 584 families residing in the CDP.
