= Ridge Wood Heights, Florida =

- Census-designated place
- Location in Sarasota County and the state of Florida
- Coordinates: 27°17′15″N 82°30′49″W
- Country: United States
- State: Florida
- County: Sarasota

Area
  - Total: 1.45 sq mi (3.76 km^{2})
  - Land: 1.41 sq mi (3.66 km^{2})
  - Water: 0.039 sq mi (0.10 km^{2})
- Elevation: 23 ft (7.0 m)

Population (2020)
  - Total: 5,064
  - Density: 3,583.3/sq mi (1,383.52/km^{2})
- Time zone: UTC-5 (Eastern (EST))
  - Summer (DST): UTC-4 (EDT)
- ZIP code: 34231
- Area code: 941
- FIPS code: 12-60475
- GNIS feature ID: 2403475

Ridge Wood Heights is a census-designated place (CDP) in Sarasota County, Florida, United States. The population was 5,064 at the 2020 census, up from 4,795 at the 2010 census. It is part of the North Port–Bradenton–Sarasota, Florida Metropolitan Statistical Area.

== Geography ==
According to the United States Census Bureau, the CDP has a total area of 1.5 square miles (3.8 km^{2}), of which 1.4 square miles (3.7 km^{2}) is land and 0.04 square miles (0.1 km^{2}), or 2.74%, is water.

== Demographics ==
Historical population
Census	Pop.	Note	%±
1970	2,528		—
1980	3,951		56.3%
1990	4,851		22.8%
2000	5,028		3.6%
2010	4,795		−4.6%
2020	5,064		5.6%

=== 2020 census ===
As of the 2020 census, Ridge Wood Heights had a population of 5,064. The median age was 47.1 years. 17.3% of residents were under the age of 18 and 21.6% were 65 years of age or older. For every 100 females there were 97.3 males, and for every 100 females age 18 and over there were 97.1 males age 18 and over.

100.0% of residents lived in urban areas, while 0.0% lived in rural areas.

There were 2,258 households in Ridge Wood Heights, of which 20.8% had children under the age of 18 living in them. Of all households, 37.5% were married-couple households, 21.0% were households with a male householder and no spouse or partner present, and 33.8% were households with a female householder and no spouse or partner present. About 34.5% of all households were made up of individuals and 16.4% had someone living alone who was 65 years of age or older.

There were 2,515 housing units, of which 10.2% were vacant. The homeowner vacancy rate was 3.2% and the rental vacancy rate was 7.6%.

Racial composition as of the 2020 census
Race	Number	Percent
White	4,081	80.6%
Black or African American	93	1.8%
American Indian and Alaska Native	20	0.4%
Asian	96	1.9%
Native Hawaiian and Other Pacific Islander	1	0.0%
Some other race	292	5.8%
Two or more races	481	9.5%
Hispanic or Latino (of any race)	734	14.5%

=== Demographic estimates ===
According to Census Bureau QuickFacts, 5.5% of residents were under age 5, 48.5% of residents were female, and there were 2.03 persons per household.

The owner-occupied housing unit rate was 71.3%, and the median value of owner-occupied housing units was $307,800. 95.6% of households had a computer and 87.6% had a broadband internet subscription.

Among residents age 25 and older, 91.1% were high school graduates or higher and 31.8% held a Bachelor's degree or higher. There were 244 veterans living in the CDP, and 12.3% of residents were foreign born.
