= Roosevelt Gardens, Florida =

- CDP
- Interactive map of Roosevelt Gardens, Florida
- Coordinates: 26°08′26″N 80°10′51″W
- Country: United States
- State: Florida
- County: Broward

Area
  - Total: 0.32 sq mi (0.83 km^{2})
  - Land: 0.32 sq mi (0.83 km^{2})
  - Water: 0 sq mi (0.00 km^{2})
- Elevation: 7 ft (2.1 m)

Population (2020)
  - Total: 2,749
  - Density: 8,528.7/sq mi (3,292.94/km^{2})
- Time zone: UTC-5 (Eastern (EST))
  - Summer (DST): UTC-4 (EDT)
- ZIP code: 33311
- Area codes: 754 and 954
- FIPS code: 12-61807
- GNIS ID: 2403492

Roosevelt Gardens is a census-designated place (CDP) in Broward County, Florida, United States. The population was 2,749 at the 2020 census.

== Geography ==
According to the United States Census Bureau, the CDP has a total area of 0.8 km^{2} (0.3 mi^{2}), all land.

== Demographics ==
Historical population
| Census | Pop. | Note | %± |
|---|---|---|---|
| 2000 | 1,923 | | — |
| 2010 | 2,456 | | 27.7% |
| 2020 | 2,749 | | 11.9% |
U.S. Decennial Census

=== Racial and ethnic composition ===
Roosevelt Gardens CDP, Florida – Racial and ethnic composition Note: the US Census treats Hispanic/Latino as an ethnic category. This table excludes Latinos from the racial categories and assigns them to a separate category. Hispanics/Latinos may be of any race.
| Race / Ethnicity (NH = Non-Hispanic) | Pop 2000 | Pop 2010 | Pop 2020 | % 2000 | % 2010 | % 2020 |
|---|---|---|---|---|---|---|
| White alone (NH) | 19 | 33 | 54 | 0.99% | 1.34% | 1.96% |
| Black or African American alone (NH) | 1,876 | 2,354 | 2,423 | 97.56% | 95.85% | 88.14% |
| Native American or Alaska Native alone (NH) | 3 | 2 | 16 | 0.16% | 0.08% | 0.58% |
| Asian alone (NH) | 0 | 1 | 3 | 0.00% | 0.04% | 0.11% |
| Native Hawaiian or Pacific Islander alone (NH) | 0 | 0 | 1 | 0.00% | 0.00% | 0.04% |
| Other race alone (NH) | 2 | 0 | 20 | 0.10% | 0.00% | 0.73% |
| Mixed race or Multiracial (NH) | 17 | 17 | 53 | 0.88% | 0.69% | 1.93% |
| Hispanic or Latino (any race) | 6 | 49 | 179 | 0.31% | 2.00% | 6.51% |
| Total | 1,923 | 2,456 | 2,749 | 100.00% | 100.00% | 100.00% |

=== 2020 census ===
As of the 2020 census, Roosevelt Gardens had a population of 2,749. The median age was 33.0 years. 28.0% of residents were under the age of 18 and 10.5% of residents were 65 years of age or older. For every 100 females, there were 91.0 males, and for every 100 females age 18 and over there were 82.1 males age 18 and over.

100.0% of residents lived in urban areas, while 0.0% lived in rural areas.

There were 899 households in Roosevelt Gardens, of which 41.3% had children under the age of 18 living in them. Of all households, 22.1% were married-couple households, 22.1% were households with a male householder and no spouse or partner present, and 48.7% were households with a female householder and no spouse or partner present. About 24.0% of all households were made up of individuals and 8.2% had someone living alone who was 65 years of age or older.

There were 972 housing units, of which 7.5% were vacant. The homeowner vacancy rate was 3.2% and the rental vacancy rate was 6.4%.

=== Demographic estimates ===
According to the 2020 American Community Survey 5-year estimates, there were 418 families residing in the CDP.

=== 2010 census ===
As of the 2010 United States census, there were 2,749 people, 808 households, and 418 families residing in the CDP.

=== 2000 census ===
At the 2000 census there were 1,923 people, 661 households, and 427 families living in the CDP. The population density was 2,320.2/km^{2} (6,068.2/mi^{2}). There were 733 housing units at an average density of 884.4/km^{2} (2,313.0/mi^{2}). The racial makeup of the CDP was 1.04% White, 97.66% African American, 0.16% Native American, 0.21% from other races, and 0.94% from two or more races. Hispanic or Latino of any race were 0.31%.

In 2000, of the 661 households 30.7% had children under the age of 18 living with them, 23.4% were married couples living together, 34.5% had a female householder with no husband present, and 35.4% were non-families. 28.1% of households were one person, and 6.4% were one person aged 65 or older. The average household size was 2.91, and the average family size was 3.61.

In 2000, the age distribution was 33.0% under the age of 18, 9.6% from 18 to 24, 27.9% from 25 to 44, 19.7% from 45 to 64, and 9.8% 65 or older. The median age was 31 years. For every 100 females, there were 88.7 males. For every 100 females age 18 and over, there were 84.0 males.

In 2000, the median household income was $17,423, and the median family income was $20,536. Males had a median income of $16,760 versus $22,796 for females. The per capita income for the CDP was $9,559. About 31.4% of families and 33.2% of the population were below the poverty line, including 47.1% of those under age 18 and 33.3% of those age 65 or over.

As of 2000, English was the first language for 100% of the population.
