= Ramblewood East, Coral Springs, Florida =

Ramblewood East, Florida
- Neighborhood
- Location within Florida Location within the United States
- Coordinates: 26°16′50″N 80°14′42″W
- Country: United States
- State: Florida
- County: Broward

Area
  - Total: 0.077 sq mi (0.2 km^{2})
  - Land: 0.077 sq mi (0.2 km^{2})
  - Water: 0 sq mi (0.0 km^{2})

Population (2000)
  - Total: 1,395
  - Density: 14,933/sq mi (5,765.5/km^{2})
- Time zone: UTC-5 (Eastern (EST))
  - Summer (DST): UTC-4 (EDT)
- FIPS code: 12-59512

Ramblewood East is a former census-designated place (CDP) in Broward County, Florida, United States. The population was 1,395 at the 2000 census. It is now incorporated as a community of Coral Springs, Florida.

== Geography ==
Ramblewood East is located at 26°16′50″N 80°14′42″W (26.280508, -80.244959).

According to the United States Census Bureau, the CDP has a total area of 0.2 km^{2} (0.077 sq mi), all land.

== Demographics ==
As of the census of 2000, there were 1,395 people, 812 households, and 349 families residing in the CDP. The population density was 5,984.6 people/km^{2} (15,500 people/mi^{2}). There were 929 housing units at an average density of 3,985.4 units/km^{2} (10,322 units/mi^{2}). The racial makeup of the CDP was 87.60% White (72.7% were Non-Hispanic White,) 4.59% African American, 0.14% Native American, 1.86% Asian, 0.07% Pacific Islander, 3.58% from other races, and 2.15% from two or more races. Hispanic or Latino of any race were 19.71% of the population.

There were 812 households, out of which 14.0% had children under the age of 18 living with them, 28.4% were married couples living together, 10.8% had a female householder with no husband present, and 57.0% were non-families. 52.7% of all households were made up of individuals, and 32.5% had someone living alone who was 65 years of age or older. The average household size was 1.72 and the average family size was 2.48.

In the CDP, the population was spread out, with 13.4% under the age of 18, 7.0% from 18 to 24, 25.9% from 25 to 44, 13.5% from 45 to 64, and 40.2% who were 65 years of age or older. The median age was 50 years. For every 100 females, there were 69.7 males. For every 100 females age 18 and over, there were 66.2 males.

The median income for a household in the CDP was $23,407, and the median income for a family was $26,454. Males had a median income of $26,875 versus $24,352 for females. The per capita income for the CDP was $20,266. About 11.3% of families and 14.4% of the population were below the poverty line, including 9.7% of those under age 18 and 12.5% of those age 65 or over.

As of 2000, English as a first language accounted for 69.91% of all residents, while Spanish made up 26.99%, and Yiddish was the mother tongue of 3.09% of the population.
