= Plantation, Sarasota County, Florida =

Plantation, Florida
- Census-designated place
- Location in Sarasota County and the state of Florida
- Coordinates: 27°03′58″N 82°22′24″W
- Country: United States
- State: Florida
- Counties: Sarasota

Area
  - Total: 2.5 sq mi (6.5 km^{2})
  - Land: 2.2 sq mi (5.7 km^{2})
  - Water: 0.31 sq mi (0.8 km^{2}) 12%
- Elevation: 13 ft (4.0 m)

Population (2010)
  - Total: 4,919
  - Density: 2,200/sq mi (860/km^{2})
- Time zone: UTC-05:00 (EST)
  - Summer (DST): UTC-04:00 (EDT)
- ZIP Code: 34293
- Area code: 941
- GNIS feature ID: 2403427

Plantation is a census-designated place (CDP) in Sarasota County, Florida, United States. The population was 5,034 at the 2020 census, up from 4,919 at the 2010 census. It is part of the North Port–Bradenton–Sarasota, Florida Metropolitan Statistical Area.

== Geography ==
According to the United States Census Bureau, the CDP has a total area of 2.5 square miles (6.5 km^{2}), of which 2.2 square miles (5.7 km^{2}) is land and 0.31 square miles (0.8 km^{2}), or 12.31%, is water.

== Demographics ==
Historical population
Census	Pop.	Note	%±
1990	1,885		—
2000	4,168		121.1%
2010	4,919		18.0%
2020	5,034		2.3%

According to the 2020 U.S. census, there was a population of 5,034 and 2,596 households. 97.1% of the population was white, 0.8% black, .07% Asian, 1.2% two or more races, and 2.3% Hispanic or Latino. The median household income was $69,049.

98.7% of the population 25 years and older were high school graduates or higher and 51.1% of that same population had a Bachelor's degree or higher. 91.8% of households had a computer and 87.8% had a broadband internet subscription.

.1% of the population was under 5 years old, 4.7% under 18 years old, and 73.6% was 65 years or older. 55.2% of the population was female. 5.6% of the population were foreign born persons.
