= Rio Pinar, Florida =

Unincorporated area in Florida, US

- Census-designated place
- Interactive map of Rio Pinar, Florida
- Coordinates: 28°31′38″N 81°15′46″W
- Country: United States
- State: Florida
- County: Orange

Area
  - Total: 2.18 sq mi (5.64 km^{2})
  - Land: 2.17 sq mi (5.63 km^{2})
  - Water: 0.0039 sq mi (0.01 km^{2})
- Elevation: 82 ft (25 m)

Population (2020)
  - Total: 5,409
  - Density: 2,489.1/sq mi (961.04/km^{2})
- Time zone: UTC-5 (Eastern (EST))
  - Summer (DST): UTC-4 (EDT)
- ZIP code: 32825
- Area codes: 407, 689
- FIPS code: 12-60562
- GNIS ID: 2583378

Rio Pinar is a census-designated place and unincorporated area in Orange County, Florida, United States. As of the 2020 census, Rio Pinar had a population of 5,409. It is part of the Orlando–Kissimmee Metropolitan Statistical Area and is home to the private Rio Pinar Country Club.

== Geography ==
Rio Pinar is located in central Orange County, Florida, 8 miles (13 km) east of downtown Orlando.

According to the United States Census Bureau, the CDP has a total area of 2.18 square miles (5.64 km^{2}), of which 2.17 square miles (5.63 km^{2}) is land and 0.0039 square miles (0.01 km^{2}), or 0.21%, is water.

== Demographics ==
Historical population
Census	Pop.	Note	%±
2020	5,409		—
U.S. Decennial Census

Rio Pinar first appeared as a census designated place in the 2010 U.S. census.

=== 2020 census ===
As of the 2020 census, the median age was 46.3 years. 17.9% of residents were under the age of 18 and 22.0% of residents were 65 years of age or older. For every 100 females there were 99.7 males, and for every 100 females age 18 and over there were 97.9 males age 18 and over.

100.0% of residents lived in urban areas, while 0.0% lived in rural areas.

There were 1,920 households in Rio Pinar, of which 28.9% had children under the age of 18 living in them. Of all households, 66.3% were married-couple households, 10.9% were households with a male householder and no spouse or partner present, and 17.9% were households with a female householder and no spouse or partner present. About 15.1% of all households were made up of individuals and 7.6% had someone living alone who was 65 years of age or older.

There were 1,975 housing units, of which 2.8% were vacant. The homeowner vacancy rate was 1.1% and the rental vacancy rate was 7.0%.

Racial composition as of the 2020 census
Race	Number	Percent
White	3,110	57.5%
Black or African American	313	5.8%
American Indian and Alaska Native	25	0.5%
Asian	340	6.3%
Native Hawaiian and Other Pacific Islander	1	0.0%
Some other race	401	7.4%
Two or more races	1,219	22.5%
Hispanic or Latino (of any race)	1,823	33.7%
