= Rolling Oaks, Florida =

- neighborhood
- Interactive map of Rolling Oaks, Florida
- Coordinates: 26°2′26″N 80°23′19″W
- Country: United States
- State: Florida
- County: Broward

Area
  - Total: 2.5 sq mi (6.6 km^{2})
  - Land: 2.5 sq mi (6.6 km^{2})
  - Water: 0 sq mi (0.0 km^{2})

Population (2000)
  - Total: 1,291
  - Density: 510/sq mi (197.1/km^{2})
- Time zone: UTC-5 (Eastern (EST))
  - Summer (DST): UTC-4 (EDT)
- FIPS code: 12-61725

Rolling Oaks was a census-designated place (CDP) in Broward County, Florida, United States. The population was 1,291 at the 2000 census. It was incorporated into the town of Southwest Ranches, Florida in 2000, and is now a neighborhood.

== Geography ==
Rolling Oaks is located at 26°2′26″N 80°23′19″W (26.040517, -80.388673).

According to the United States Census Bureau, the CDP has a total area of 6.6 km^{2} (2.5 sq mi), all land.

== Demographics ==
As of the census of 2000, there were 1,291 people, 392 households, and 332 families residing in the CDP. The population density was 197.0 people/km^{2} (510 people/mi^{2}). There were 400 housing units at an average density of 61.0 units/km^{2} (158 units/mi^{2}). The racial makeup of the CDP was 90.24% White (69.3% were Non-Hispanic White,) 3.56% African American, 0.15% Native American, 1.08% Asian, 2.63% from other races, and 2.32% from two or more races. Hispanic or Latino of any race were 24.24% of the population.

There were 392 households, out of which 41.1% had children under the age of 18 living with them, 75.5% were married couples living together, 7.4% had a female householder with no husband present, and 15.1% were non-families. 8.4% of all households were made up of individuals, and 1.5% had someone living alone who was 65 years of age or older. The average household size was 3.29 and the average family size was 3.55.

In the CDP, the population was spread out, with 29.4% under the age of 18, 5.5% from 18 to 24, 27.0% from 25 to 44, 30.0% from 45 to 64, and 8.1% who were 65 years of age or older. The median age was 39 years. For every 100 females, there were 97.7 males. For every 100 females age 18 and over, there were 103.8 males.

The median income for a household in the CDP was $83,943, and the median income for a family was $95,194. Males had a median income of $80,468 versus $50,568 for females. The per capita income for the CDP was $37,008. About 3.5% of families and 7.3% of the population were below the poverty line, including 9.6% of those under age 18 and 9.0% of those age 65 or over.

As of 2000, before being annexed to Southwest Ranches, English as a first language accounted for 70.42% of all residents, while Spanish as a mother tongue made up 29.57%% of the population.
