= Rock Island (Fort Lauderdale) =

Rock Island, Florida
- neighborhood
- Interactive map of Rock Island, Florida
- Coordinates: 26°9′13″N 80°10′48″W
- Country: United States
- State: Florida
- County: Broward

Area
  - Total: 0.62 sq mi (1.6 km^{2})
  - Land: 0.62 sq mi (1.6 km^{2})
  - Water: 0 sq mi (0.0 km^{2})
- Elevation: 3.3 ft (1 m)

Population (2000)
  - Total: 3,076
  - Density: 5,010/sq mi (1,935/km^{2})
- Time zone: UTC-5 (Eastern (EST))
  - Summer (DST): UTC-4 (EDT)
- FIPS code: 12-61412
- GNIS feature ID: 1853282

Rock Island was a census-designated place (CDP) in Broward County, Florida, United States. The population was 3,076 at the 2000 census. It is now a neighborhood of Fort Lauderdale.

== Geography ==
Rock Island is located at 26°9′13″N 80°10′48″W (26.153712, -80.180014).

According to the United States Census Bureau, the CDP has a total area of 1.6 km^{2} (0.62 sq mi), all land.

== Demographics ==
Rock Island CDP, Florida – Racial and ethnic composition Note: the US Census treats Hispanic/Latino as an ethnic category. This table excludes Latinos from the racial categories and assigns them to a separate category. Hispanics/Latinos may be of any race.
Race / Ethnicity (NH = Non-Hispanic)	Pop 2000	2000
White alone (NH)	40	1.30%
Black or African American alone (NH)	2,960	96.23%
Native American or Alaska Native alone (NH)	4	0.13%
Asian alone (NH)	7	0.23%
Native Hawaiian or Pacific Islander alone (NH)	0	0.00%
Other race alone (NH)	4	0.13%
Mixed race or Multiracial (NH)	34	1.11%
Hispanic or Latino (any race)	27	0.88%
Total	3,076	100.00%

As of the 2000 census, there were 3,076 people, 961 households, and 750 families residing in the CDP. The population density was 1,947.0 people/km^{2} (5,043 people/mi^{2}). There were 1,015 housing units at an average density of 642.4 units/km^{2} (1,664 units/mi^{2}). The racial makeup of the CDP was 1.69% White (1.3% were Non-Hispanic White,) 96.52% African American, 0.16% Native American, 0.23% Asian, 0.07% Pacific Islander, 0.20% from other races, and 1.14% from two or more races. Hispanic or Latino of any race were 0.88% of the population.

There were 961 households, out of which 29.2% had children under the age of 18 living with them, 37.5% were married couples living together, 34.2% had a female householder with no husband present, and 21.9% were non-families. 19.1% of all households were made up of individuals, and 6.5% had someone living alone who was 65 years of age or older. The average household size was 3.17 and the average family size was 3.61.

In the CDP, the population was spread out, with 30.3% under the age of 18, 9.0% from 18 to 24, 27.0% from 25 to 44, 23.6% from 45 to 64, and 10.0% who were 65 years of age or older. The median age was 34 years. For every 100 females, there were 84.9 males. For every 100 females age 18 and over, there were 79.5 males.

The median income for a household in the CDP was $29,766, and the median income for a family was $37,200. Males had a median income of $28,547 versus $22,409 for females. The per capita income for the CDP was $12,145. About 18.2% of families and 21.7% of the population were below the poverty line, including 29.1% of those under age 18 and 34.0% of those age 65 or over.

As of 2000, English was spoken by 100% of the population.
