= Roeville, Florida =

- Unincorporated community
- Location within Florida Location within the United States
- Coordinates: 30°40′49″N 86°59′53″W
- Country: United States
- State: Florida
- County: Santa Rosa

Area
  - Total: 4.581 sq mi (11.86 km^{2})
  - Land: 4.570 sq mi (11.84 km^{2})
  - Water: 0.011 sq mi (0.028 km^{2})
- Elevation: 75 ft (23 m)

Population (2010)
  - Total: 608
  - Density: 133/sq mi (51.4/km^{2})
- Time zone: UTC-6 (Central (CST))
  - Summer (DST): UTC-5 (CDT)
- ZIP code: 32570
- Area code: 850
- GNIS feature ID: 2583380

Roeville is an unincorporated community and census-designated place in Santa Rosa County, Florida, United States. As of the 2020 census, Roeville had a population of 607.

== Geography ==
According to the U.S. Census Bureau, the community has an area of 4.581 square miles (11.86 km^{2}); 4.570 square miles (11.84 km^{2}) of its area is land, and 0.011 square miles (0.028 km^{2}) is water.

== Demographics ==
Roeville first appeared as a census designated place in the 2010 U.S. census.
