= St. George, Lauderhill, Florida =

St. George, Florida
- neighborhood
- Interactive map of St. George, Florida
- Coordinates: 26°8′3″N 80°11′43″W
- Country: United States
- State: Florida
- County: Broward

Area
  - Total: 0.46 sq mi (1.2 km^{2})
  - Land: 0.46 sq mi (1.2 km^{2})
  - Water: 0 sq mi (0.0 km^{2})

Population (2000)
  - Total: 2,450
  - Density: 5,460/sq mi (2,108.2/km^{2})
- Time zone: UTC-5 (Eastern (EST))
  - Summer (DST): UTC-4 (EDT)
- FIPS code: 12-62637

St. George was a census-designated place (CDP) in Broward County, Florida, United States. The population was 2,450 at the 2000 census. It now serves as a neighborhood of Lauderhill, Florida.

== Geography ==
St. George is located at 26°8′3″N 80°11′43″W (26.134210, -80.195363).

According to the United States Census Bureau, the CDP has a total area of 1.2 km^{2} (0.46 sq mi), all land.

== Demographics ==
St. George first appeared as a census designated place in the 2000 U.S. census created from part of Browardale CDP. The CDP was annexed to the city of Lauderhill prior to the 2010 U.S. census.

St. George CDP, Florida – Racial and ethnic composition Note: the US Census treats Hispanic/Latino as an ethnic category. This table excludes Latinos from the racial categories and assigns them to a separate category. Hispanics/Latinos may be of any race.
Race / Ethnicity (NH = Non-Hispanic)	Pop 2000	2000
White alone (NH)	24	0.98%
Black or African American alone (NH)	2,374	96.90%
Native American or Alaska Native alone (NH)	0	0.00%
Asian alone (NH)	0	0.00%
Native Hawaiian or Pacific Islander alone (NH)	1	0.04%
Other race alone (NH)	4	0.16%
Mixed race or Multiracial (NH)	20	0.82%
Hispanic or Latino (any race)	27	1.10%
Total	2,450	100.00%

As of the census of 2000, there were 2,450 people, 748 households, and 613 families residing in the CDP. The population density was 2,102.1 people/km^{2} (5,444 people/mi^{2}). There were 776 housing units at an average density of 665.8 units/km^{2} (1,724 units/mi^{2}). The racial makeup of the CDP was 1.39% White, 97.35% African American, 0.04% Pacific Islander, 0.41% from other races, and 0.82% from two or more races. Hispanic or Latino of any race were 1.10% of the population.

There were 748 households, out of which 28.9% had children under the age of 18 living with them, 42.6% were married couples living together, 31.4% had a female householder with no husband present, and 18.0% were non-families. 14.7% of all households were made up of individuals, and 6.4% had someone living alone who was 65 years of age or older. The average household size was 3.28 and the average family size was 3.59.

In the CDP, the population was spread out, with 29.7% under the age of 18, 8.7% from 18 to 24, 23.9% from 25 to 44, 28.1% from 45 to 64, and 9.6% who were 65 years of age or older. The median age was 35 years. For every 100 females, there were 89.0 males. For every 100 females age 18 and over, there were 80.5 males.

The median income for a household in the CDP was $38,750, and the median income for a family was $39,043. Males had a median income of $32,378 versus $22,286 for females. The per capita income for the CDP was $13,410. About 9.4% of families and 10.9% of the population were below the poverty line, including 9.4% of those under age 18 and 3.1% of those age 65 or over.

As of 2000, English as a first language accounted for 98.35% of all residents, while Spanish was the mother tongue of 1.64% of the population.
