= River Ridge, Florida =

- Unincorporated community
- Location within Florida Location within the United States
- Coordinates: 28°15′59″N 82°37′02″W
- Country: United States
- State: Florida
- County: Pasco

Area
  - Total: 4.418 sq mi (11.44 km^{2})
  - Land: 4.418 sq mi (11.44 km^{2})
  - Water: 0 sq mi (0 km^{2})
- Elevation: 36 ft (11 m)

Population (2010)
  - Total: 4,702
  - Density: 1,064/sq mi (410.9/km^{2})
- Time zone: UTC-5 (Eastern (EST))
  - Summer (DST): UTC-4 (EDT)
- Area code: 727
- GNIS feature ID: 2583379

River Ridge is an unincorporated community and census-designated place in Pasco County, Florida, United States. As of the 2020 census, River Ridge had a population of 5,107.

== Geography ==
According to the U.S. Census Bureau, the community has an area of 4.418 square miles (11.44 km^{2}), all of it land.

It is east of New Port Richey, Florida and north east of Jay B. Starkey Wilderness Park. Located South of Florida State Road 52 inland from Hudson, it is within the Tampa–St. Petersburg–Clearwater Metropolitan Statistical Area (MSA) and the Southwest Florida Water Management District.

== Demographics ==
River Ridge first appeared as a census designated place in the 2010 U.S. census.

=== 2020 census ===
As of the 2020 census, River Ridge had a population of 5,107. The median age was 47.9 years. 19.2% of residents were under the age of 18 and 23.8% of residents were 65 years of age or older. For every 100 females there were 89.9 males, and for every 100 females age 18 and over there were 88.1 males age 18 and over.

100.0% of residents lived in urban areas, while 0.0% lived in rural areas.

There were 2,067 households in River Ridge, of which 27.6% had children under the age of 18 living in them. Of all households, 54.7% were married-couple households, 12.1% were households with a male householder and no spouse or partner present, and 25.9% were households with a female householder and no spouse or partner present. About 22.2% of all households were made up of individuals and 12.3% had someone living alone who was 65 years of age or older.

There were 2,174 housing units, of which 4.9% were vacant. The homeowner vacancy rate was 1.2% and the rental vacancy rate was 6.1%.

Racial composition as of the 2020 census
Race	Number	Percent
White	4,340	85.0%
Black or African American	91	1.8%
American Indian and Alaska Native	9	0.2%
Asian	98	1.9%
Native Hawaiian and Other Pacific Islander	7	0.1%
Some other race	129	2.5%
Two or more races	433	8.5%
Hispanic or Latino (of any race)	552	10.8%

== See also ==
- River Ridge High School (Florida)
