= Royal Palm Ranches, Florida =

- neighborhood
- Interactive map of Royal Palm Ranches, Florida
- Coordinates: 26°2′28″N 80°16′31″W
- Country: United States
- State: Florida
- County: Broward

Area
  - Total: 0.31 sq mi (0.8 km^{2})
  - Land: 0.31 sq mi (0.8 km^{2})
  - Water: 0 sq mi (0.0 km^{2})

Population (2000)
  - Total: 294
  - Density: 1,009/sq mi (389.4/km^{2})
- Time zone: UTC-5 (Eastern (EST))
  - Summer (DST): UTC-4 (EDT)
- FIPS code: 12-62142

Royal Palm Ranches is a former census-designated place (CDP) in Broward County, Florida, United States. The population was 294 at the 2000 census. It now serves as a community of Cooper City, Florida.

== Geography ==
Royal Palm Ranches is located at 26°2′28″N 80°16′31″W (26.041240, -80.275242).

According to the United States Census Bureau, the CDP has a total area of 0.8 km^{2} (0.31 sq mi), all land.

== Demographics ==
As of the census of 2000, there were 294 people, 92 households, and 81 families residing in the CDP. The population density was 391.4 people/km^{2} (1,014 people/mi^{2}). There were 98 housing units at an average density of 130.5 units/km^{2} (338 units/mi^{2}). The racial makeup of the CDP was 88.44% White (78.2% were Non-Hispanic,) 0.68% African American, 4.08% Asian, 3.40% from other races, and 3.40% from two or more races. Hispanic or Latino of any race were 14.29% of the population.

There were 92 households, out of which 41.3% had children under the age of 18 living with them, 75.0% were married couples living together, 7.6% had a female householder with no husband present, and 10.9% were non-families. 8.7% of all households were made up of individuals, and none had someone living alone who was 65 years of age or older. The average household size was 3.20 and the average family size was 3.39.

In the CDP, the population was spread out, with 28.2% under the age of 18, 5.8% from 18 to 24, 26.5% from 25 to 44, 31.3% from 45 to 64, and 8.2% who were 65 years of age or older. The median age was 42 years. For every 100 females, there were 107.0 males. For every 100 females age 18 and over, there were 108.9 males.

The median income for a household in the CDP was $125,000, and the median income for a family was $152,329. Males had a median income of $78,641 versus $42,321 for females. The per capita income for the CDP was $39,274. None of the population or families were below the poverty line.

As of 2000, English as a first language was spoken by 100% of the population.
