= West Bradenton, Florida =

- Census-designated place
- Location in Manatee County and the state of Florida
- Coordinates: 27°30′03″N 82°36′58″W
- Country: United States
- State: Florida
- County: Manatee

Area
  - Total: 1.36 sq mi (3.52 km^{2})
  - Land: 1.30 sq mi (3.37 km^{2})
  - Water: 0.058 sq mi (0.15 km^{2})
- Elevation: 20 ft (6.1 m)

Population (2020)
  - Total: 4,247
  - Density: 3,264.4/sq mi (1,260.39/km^{2})
- Time zone: UTC-5 (Eastern (EST))
  - Summer (DST): UTC-4 (EDT)
- ZIP code: 34209 (Bradenton)
- Area code: 941
- FIPS code: 12-76050
- GNIS feature ID: 2402998

West Bradenton is an unincorporated area and census-designated place (CDP) in Manatee County, Florida United States. The population was 4,247 at the 2020 census, up from 4,192 at the 2010 census. It is part of the Sarasota metropolitan area.

== Geography ==
West Bradenton is bordered to the east by the city of Bradenton, to the north by the Manatee River, an arm of Tampa Bay, and to the south by Florida State Road 64. The CDP extends west as far as Warner West Bayou and 67th Street NW. The unincorporated community of Palma Sola is to the west.

According to the United States Census Bureau, the West Bradenton CDP has a total area of 1.4 square miles (3.6 km^{2}), of which 0.1 square miles (0.3 km^{2}), or 4.27%, are water.

== Demographics ==
Historical population
Census	Pop.	Note	%±
1980	6,162		—
1990	8,767		42.3%
2000	4,444		−49.3%
2010	4,192		−5.7%
2020	4,247		1.3%

=== 2020 census ===
As of the 2020 census, West Bradenton had a population of 4,247. The median age was 48.5 years. 18.6% of residents were under the age of 18 and 23.8% of residents were 65 years of age or older. For every 100 females there were 90.7 males, and for every 100 females age 18 and over there were 89.8 males age 18 and over.

100.0% of residents lived in urban areas, while 0.0% lived in rural areas.

There were 1,690 households in West Bradenton, of which 25.4% had children under the age of 18 living in them. Of all households, 55.8% were married-couple households, 13.9% were households with a male householder and no spouse or partner present, and 24.1% were households with a female householder and no spouse or partner present. About 23.0% of all households were made up of individuals and 12.8% had someone living alone who was 65 years of age or older.

There were 1,803 housing units, of which 6.3% were vacant. The homeowner vacancy rate was 1.9% and the rental vacancy rate was 7.6%.

Racial composition as of the 2020 census
Race	Number	Percent
White	3,732	87.9%
Black or African American	58	1.4%
American Indian and Alaska Native	9	0.2%
Asian	77	1.8%
Native Hawaiian and Other Pacific Islander	9	0.2%
Some other race	50	1.2%
Two or more races	312	7.3%
Hispanic or Latino (of any race)	272	6.4%

=== 2000 census ===
As of the census of 2000, there were 4,444 people, 1,698 households, and 1,292 families residing in the CDP. The population density was 3,256.0 inhabitants per square mile (1,257.1/km^{2}). There were 1,772 housing units at an average density of 1,298.3 per square mile (501.3/km^{2}). The racial makeup of the CDP was 97.05% White, 0.52% African American, 0.18% Native American, 0.92% Asian, 0.05% Pacific Islander, 0.41% from other races, and 0.88% from two or more races. Hispanic or Latino of any race were 2.68% of the population.

There were 1,698 households, out of which 34.1% had children under the age of 18 living with them, 63.7% were married couples living together, 9.4% had a female householder with no husband present, and 23.9% were non-families. 19.4% of all households were made up of individuals, and 9.0% had someone living alone who was 65 years of age or older. The average household size was 2.62 and the average family size was 3.00.

In the CDP, the population was spread out, with 25.4% under the age of 18, 5.0% from 18 to 24, 25.9% from 25 to 44, 27.5% from 45 to 64, and 16.2% who were 65 years of age or older. The median age was 41 years. For every 100 females, there were 91.1 males. For every 100 females age 18 and over, there were 89.8 males.

The median income for a household in the CDP was $52,989, and the median income for a family was $57,400. Males had a median income of $38,168 versus $24,471 for females. The per capita income for the CDP was $27,262. About 3.3% of families and 5.2% of the population were below the poverty line, including 4.9% of those under age 18 and 4.8% of those age 65 or over.
