= Crystal Lake =

Crystal Lake or Crystal Lakes may refer to:

== Lakes ==
=== Canada ===
- Crystal Lake (Saskatchewan)
- Crystal Lake (Ontario), which drains into the Lynn River

=== United States ===
- Crystal Lake (California), a mountain lake in Nevada County, California
- Crystal Lake Recreation Area, California
- Crystal Lake (Broward County, Florida), a lake in Deerfield Beach
- Crystal Lake (Hardee County, Florida), a manmade lake in Crystal Lake Village
- Crystal Lake (Davenport, Florida), one of seven lakes named Crystal Lake in Polk County, Florida
- Crystal Lake (Lakeland, Florida), one of seven lakes named Crystal Lake in Polk County, Florida
- Crystal Lake (south Winter Haven, Florida), one of seven lakes named Crystal Lake in Polk County, Florida
- Crystal Lake (Gray, Maine), in Gray, Maine
- Crystal Lake (Anonymous Pond), in Harrison, Maine
- Crystal Lake (Gardner, Massachusetts)
- Crystal Lake (Newton, Massachusetts)
- Crystal Lake (Michigan), several
- Crystal Lake (Benzie County, Michigan), near Frankfort
- Crystal Lake (Pontiac, Michigan), a private lake in Oakland County
- Crystal Lake (Dakota, Minnesota) in Burnsville
- Crystal Lake (Otter Tail, Minnesota), near Pelican Rapids
- Crystal Lake (Polk County, Minnesota)
- Crystal Lake (Rice County, Minnesota)
- Crystal Lake (Montana), in Gallatin County
- Crystal Lake (Granite County, Montana)
- Crystal Lake (Enfield, New Hampshire)
- Crystal Lake (Gilmanton, New Hampshire), in Belknap County
- Crystal Lake (Manchester, New Hampshire), a natural pond
- Crystal Lake (Delaware County, New York)
- Crystal Lake (Henderson, Jefferson County, New York)
- Crystal Lake (Theresa, Jefferson County, New York)
- Crystal Lake (Otsego County, New York)
- Crystal Lake (New Rochelle, New York), in Westchester County
- Crystal Lake (Ohio), in the village of Silver Lake
- Crystal Lake (South Dakota)
- Crystal Lake (Vermont), near Barton in Orleans County
- Crystal Lake (Vilas County, Wisconsin)

== Settlements ==
=== United States ===
- Crystal Lake, Connecticut
- Crystal Lake, Polk County, Florida
- Crystal Lake, Washington County, Florida, an unincorporated community
- Crystal Lake, Illinois
- Crystal Lake, Iowa
- Crystal Lake Township, Michigan
- Crystal Lake Park, Missouri
- Crystal Lakes, New Jersey, an unincorporated community located within the borough of Franklin Lakes, New Jersey
- Crystal Lakes, Missouri
- Crystal Lakes, Ohio
- Crystal Lake, Texas
- Crystal Lake, Barron County, Wisconsin
- Crystal Lake, Marquette County, Wisconsin

== Other uses ==
- Crystal Lake Recreation Area, California
- Crystal Lake Scout Reservation, Oneida County, Wisconsin
- Crystal Lake station, a Metra commuter rail station in Crystal Lake, Illinois
- Crystal Lake (band), a Japanese metalcore band
- "The Crystal Lake", a 2000 song by Grandaddy
- Camp Crystal Lake, the setting for many films in the Friday the 13th series
- Crystal Lake (TV series), an American television series based on the Friday the 13th series

== See also ==
- Lake Crystal, Minnesota, a city
- Lake Crystal (Blue Earth County, Minnesota), a lake near the city
- Crystal Pool (disambiguation)
