= Crystal Lake, Florida =

Crystal Lake, Florida may refer to:

== Lakes ==
- Crystal Lake (Broward County, Florida), in Deerfield Beach
- Crystal Lake (Hardee County, Florida), a manmade lake in Crystal Lake Village
- Crystal Lake (Davenport, Florida), one of seven Crystal Lakes in Polk County, Florida
- Crystal Lake (Lakeland, Florida), one of seven Crystal Lakes in Polk County, Florida
- Crystal Lake (south Winter Haven, Florida), one of seven Crystal Lakes in Polk County, Florida

== Settlements ==
- Crystal Lake, Polk County, Florida, a census-designated place
- Crystal Lake, Washington County, Florida, an unincorporated community
