= List of places in Florida: C =

This list of current cities, towns, unincorporated communities, counties, and other recognized places in the U.S. state of Florida also includes information on the number and names of counties in which the place lies, and its lower and upper zip code bounds, if applicable.

Name of place	Number of counties	Counties	Lower zip code	Upper zip code
Cabana Colony	1	Palm Beach		
Cabbage Bluff	1	Volusia		
Cabbage Grove	1	Taylor		
Cadillac	1	Alachua		
Cairo	1	Bay		
Caleb	1	Duval		
Callahan	1	Nassau	32011	
Callaway	1	Bay	32404	
Calloway	1	Bay		
Calphos	1	Citrus		
Cambon	1	Duval		
Camellia Gardens	1	Orange	32809	
Cameron City	1	Seminole	32771	
Camp	1	Hernando		
Campbell	1	Osceola	32741	
Campbellton	1	Jackson	32426	
Camp Blanding	1	Clay	32091	
Camp Echockotee	1	Clay		
Camp Ocala	1	Lake		
Camp Roosevelt	1	Marion	32670	
Camps	1	Hernando		
Camps Mine	1	Hernando	33512	
Camps Still	1	Hamilton		
Campton	1	Okaloosa	32567	
Campville	1	Alachua	32640	
Cana	1	St. Lucie		
Canaan	1	Seminole	32771	
Canal Point	1	Palm Beach	33438	
Canaveral Beach	1	Brevard		
Canaveral Groves	1	Brevard		
Canaveral Harbor	1	Brevard		
Canaveral National Seashore	2	Brevard, Volusia	32780	
Canaveral Port Unit	1	Brevard		
Candler	1	Marion	32111	
Cane	1	Palm Beach		
Caney Creek	1	Walton		
Cannon Town	1	Okaloosa	32531	
Canova Beach	1	Brevard	32935	
Cantonment	1	Escambia	32533	
Cape Canaveral	1	Brevard	32920	
Cape Canaveral Air Force Station	1	Brevard	32920	
Cape Coral	1	Lee	33904	
Cape Haze	1	Charlotte	33946	
Cape Sable	1	Monroe		
Cape San Blas	1	Gulf		
Cape Vista	1	Manatee	33505	
Capitola	1	Leon	32301	
Capitol Hills	1	Leon		
Capps	1	Jefferson	32336	
Captiva	1	Lee	33924	
Carbide	1	Nassau		
Carbur	1	Taylor		
Cardwell	1	Palm Beach		
Caribbean Key	1	Palm Beach	33432	
Carleton	1	Putnam	32640	
Carl Fisher	1	Miami-Dade	33139	
Carlson	1	Sumter		
Carlton	1	Pinellas	34625	
Carlton	1	St. Lucie		
Carlton Village	1	Lake	32748	
Carnestown	1	Collier		
Carol City	1	Miami-Dade	33055	
Carolina	1	Osceola		
Carr	1	Calhoun	32421	
Carrabelle	1	Franklin	32322	
Carrabelle Beach	1	Franklin	32322	
Carrabelle Lighthouse	1	Franklin		
Carraway	1	Putnam	32077	
Carroll	1	Polk		
Carrollwood	1	Hillsborough	33618	
Carrollwood (CDP)	1	Hillsborough		
Carrollwood Village	1	Hillsborough		
Carters	1	Polk	33801	
Carters Bulkhead	1	Brevard		
Carters Corner	1	Polk		
Carver	1	Duval	32209	
Carver Heights	1	Broward	33441	
Carver Manor	1	Duval		
Carver Ranches	1	Broward		
Carver Ranch Estates	1	Broward	33023	
Carver Village	1	Broward	33060	
Cary	1	Duval		
Caryville	1	Washington	32427	
Casa Blanco	1	Jefferson	32344	
Casa Cola	1	St. Johns		
Casey Key	1	Sarasota		
Cassadaga	1	Volusia	32706	
Casselberry	1	Seminole	32707	30
Cassia	1	Lake	32726	
Cassia Station	1	Lake	32776	
Castillo de San Marcos National Monument	1	St. Johns	32084	
Castle Hill	1	Lake		
Catawba	1	Citrus		
Cecil Field Naval Air Station	1	Duval	32215	
Cedar Creek	1	Marion		
Cedar Grove	1	Bay	32401	
Cedar Hammock	1	Manatee	34205	
Cedar Hills	1	Duval	32210	
Cedar Hills Estates	1	Duval		
Cedar Key	1	Levy	32625	
Cedar Point	1	Duval	32218	
Celebration	1	Osceola	34747	
Center City	1	Pinellas	33540	
Center Hill	1	Sumter	33514	
Center Park	1	Duval		
Centerville	1	Leon	32308	
Central	1	Hillsborough		
Central City	1	Liberty		
Century	1	Escambia	32535	
Century 21	1	Lee	33901	
Century Corners	1	Palm Beach	33409	
Century Village	1	Palm Beach		
Cerrogordo	1	Holmes	32464	
Chaco	1	Seminole		
Chain O'Lakes	1	Lake	32767	
Chaires	1	Leon	32301	
Chaires Cross Roads	1	Leon	32301	
Chambers Estates	1	Broward		
ChampionsGate	1	Osceola		
Chancey	1	Lafayette		
Channell	1	Lake	32757	
Chantilly Acres	1	Alachua		
Chapel Hill	1	Palm Beach		
Charles Springs	1	Suwannee		
Charleston Park	1	Lee		
Charlotte Beach	1	Charlotte	32927	
Charlotte Harbor	1	Charlotte	33950	
Charlotte Park	1	Charlotte	33950	
Charlotte Square	1	Charlotte	33948	
Chase	1	Seminole		
Chaseville	1	Duval	32211	
Chason	1	Calhoun		
Chassahowitzka	1	Citrus	32650	
Chatham	1	Monroe		
Chatmar	1	Marion	32630	
Chattahoochee	1	Gadsden	32324	
Chattahoochee River	1	Gadsden		
Chemical	1	Pinellas		
Cherry Lake	1	Madison	32340	
Cherry Lake	1	Sumter		
Cherry Lake Farms	1	Madison		
Chester	1	Nassau	32097	
Cheval	1	Hillsborough		
Chiefland	1	Levy	32626	
Childs	1	Highlands		
Chipley	1	Washington	32428	
Chipola	1	Calhoun	32421	
Chipola	1	Jackson	32450	
Chipola Park	1	Calhoun	32449	
Chipola Terrace	1	Jackson		
Choctaw	1	Walton	32454	
Choctaw Beach	1	Walton	32439	
Chokoloskee	1	Collier	33925	
Chosen	1	Palm Beach	33430	
Chosen Labor Camp	1	Palm Beach	33430	
Christina	1	Polk	33803	
Christmas	1	Orange	32709	
Chula Vista	1	Broward		
Chula Vista Isles	1	Broward		
Chuluota	1	Seminole	32766	
Chumuckla	1	Santa Rosa	32570	
Chumuckla Springs	1	Santa Rosa		
Cinco Bayou	1	Okaloosa	32548	
Cisky Park	1	Lake		
Citra	1	Marion	32113	
Citronelle	1	Citrus	32629	
Citrus	1	Citrus	32650	
Citrus Center	1	Glades	33471	
Citrus Hills	1	Citrus		
Citrus Park	1	Hillsborough	33625	
Citrus Ridge	1	Indian River		
Citrus Ridge	4	Lake, Orange, Osceola, Polk		
Citrus Springs	1	Citrus	34433	
Citrus Tower	1	Lake	32711	
City of Sunrise	1	Broward	33313	
City Point	1	Brevard	32922	
City Trailer Park	1	Sarasota		
City View	1	Lee	33901	
Clair Mel	1	Hillsborough		
Clair-Mel City	1	Hillsborough	33619	
Clara	1	Taylor		
Clarcona	1	Orange	32710	
Clark	1	Alachua	32643	
Clarksville	1	Calhoun	32430	
Clarkwild	1	Hillsborough		
Clay Hill	1	Clay		
Clay Island	1	Lake		
Clayno	1	Bradford		
Clay Sink	1	Pasco		
Clear Lake	1	Alachua	32601	
Clear Springs	1	Okaloosa		
Clear Springs	1	Polk		
Clear Springs	1	Walton	32567	
Clearview	1	Pinellas	33714	
Clearwater	1	Pinellas	34616	75
Clearwater Beach	1	Pinellas	34630	
Clearwater East	1	Pinellas	33519	
Clermont	1	Lake	34711	
Cleveland	1	Charlotte	33950	
Cleveland Street	1	Pinellas	34615	
Clewiston	1	Hendry	33440	
Clifton	1	Duval	32211	
Cliftonville	1	Union		
Clinton Heights	1	Pasco		
Clio	1	Liberty		
Cloud Lake	1	Palm Beach	33406	
Cluster Springs	1	Walton		
Coach Light Manor	1	Lee	33901	
Coachman	1	Pinellas		
Cobb Creek	1	Santa Rosa		
Cobb Cross Roads	1	Holmes		
Cobbtown	1	Santa Rosa	32565	
Cocoa	1	Brevard	32922	27
Cocoa Beach	1	Brevard	32931	
Cocoa West	1	Brevard	32922	
Coconut	1	Lee	33923	
Coconut Creek	1	Broward	33063	
Coconut Creek Park	1	Broward		
Coconut Grove	1	Miami-Dade	33133	
Cody	1	Jefferson		
Cody's Corner	1	Flagler	32010	
Coker	1	Hardee		
Coldwater	1	Santa Rosa	32570	
Colee	1	Broward	33301	
Coleman	1	Sumter	33521	
Colfax	1	St. Johns		
College Park	1	Broward	33441	
College Park	1	Orange	32804	
College Park	1	St. Johns		
College Plaza	1	Manatee	33507	
College Point	1	Bay	32401	
College Station	1	Bay		
Collier City	1	Broward	33060	
Collier City	1	Collier		
Collier Manor	1	Broward	33064	
Collier Manor-Cresthaven	1	Broward		
Collier Park	1	Broward		
Collins Mill	1	Jackson		
Collins Park Estates	1	St. Lucie		
Colohatchee	1	Broward		
Colonial Hills	1	Pasco	33552	
Colonial Manor	1	Duval	32205	
Colonialtown	1	Orange	32803	
Columbia City	1	Columbia	32055	
Combee Settlement	1	Polk	33801	
Compass Lake	1	Jackson	32448	
Conant	1	Lake		
Conch Key	1	Monroe	33001	
Concord	1	Gadsden	32333	
Concord	1	Leon		
Cone	1	Hillsborough		
Confer	1	Lake		
Congress Avenue	1	Palm Beach	33461	
Conner	1	Marion		
Conners Ford	1	Liberty		
Connersville	1	Polk	33830	
Connersville	1	Volusia		
Connerton	1	Pasco		
Conrad	1	Volusia		
Conrock	1	Hernando		
Conshal	1	Polk		
Convict Springs	1	Lafayette		
Conway	1	Orange	32809	
Cooglers Beach	1	Hernando		
Cooks Hammock	1	Lafayette	32066	
Cooper City	1	Broward	33328	
Coopertown	1	Miami-Dade		
Copeland	1	Collier	33926	
Copeland Settlement	1	Alachua		
Coquina Gables	1	St. Johns		
Cora	1	Santa Rosa	32565	
Coral Bay	1	Miami-Dade		
Coral Cove	1	Sarasota	33580	
Coral Estates	1	Broward	33305	
Coral Gables	1	Miami-Dade	33134	
Coral Gardens	1	Martin	33494	
Coral Heights	1	Broward	33307	
Coral Hills	1	Broward		
Coral Manor	1	Broward		
Coral Point	1	Broward	33305	
Coral Ridge	1	Broward	33306	
Coral Ridge Isles	1	Broward		
Coral Springs	1	Broward	33065	
Coral Terrace	1	Miami-Dade		
Coral Way Village	1	Miami-Dade	33155	
Coralwood	1	Lee	33904	
Coral Woods	1	Broward	33307	
Cordova Mall	1	Escambia	32504	
Coreytown	1	Pinellas		
Corkscrew	1	Collier	33934	
Cornwell	1	Highlands	33857	
Coronado	1	Volusia	32069	
Coronet	1	Hillsborough	33566	
Coronet Junction	1	Hillsborough		
Corry Field	1	Escambia	32511	
Corry Station Naval Technical Training Center	1	Escambia	32511	
Cortez	1	Manatee	34215	
Cortez Road	1	Manatee	33507	
Cosme	1	Hillsborough		
Cosmo	1	Duval		
Cosson Mill	1	Walton		
Cottage Colony	1	Volusia		
Cottage Hill	1	Escambia	32533	
Cottage Point	1	Lee	33901	
Cottondale	1	Jackson	32431	
Cottonplant	1	Marion	32670	
Council	1	Lee		
Country Club	1	Miami-Dade		
Country Club	1	St. Lucie	33452	
Country Club Acres	1	Palm Beach	33444	
Country Club Estates	1	Columbia	32055	
Country Club Estates	1	Miami-Dade		
Country Club Estates	1	Polk	33801	
Country Club Isles	1	Broward		
Country Club Trail	1	Palm Beach		
Country Estates	1	Broward		
Countryside	1	Pinellas		
Country Walk	1	Miami-Dade		
County Club Acres	1	Palm Beach		
Courtenay	1	Brevard	32952	
Cove	1	Bay	32401	
Cow Creek	1	Volusia		
Cox	1	Calhoun	32424	
Coytown	1	Orange	32803	
Crackertown	1	Levy	32649	
Craggs	1	Gilchrist		
Craig	1	Monroe		
Crandall	1	Nassau		
Crawford	1	Nassau		
Crawfordville	1	Wakulla	32327	
Creels	1	Franklin		
Creighton	1	Volusia		
Crescent Beach	1	Brevard		
Crescent Beach	1	St. Johns	32084	
Crescent Beach	1	Sarasota	34242	
Crescent City	1	Putnam	32112	
Crescent City Station	1	Putnam		
Cresthaven	1	Broward	33064	
Cresthaven	1	Palm Beach	33406	
Crestview	1	Miami-Dade	33054	
Crestview	1	Okaloosa	32536	
Crewsville	1	Hardee	33890	
Cromanton	1	Bay		
Crooked Lake Park	1	Polk		
Croom	1	Hernando		
Croom-A-Coochee	1	Sumter	33597	
Cross Bayou	1	Pinellas		
Cross City	1	Dixie	32628	
Cross County	1	Palm Beach	33409	
Cross Creek	1	Alachua	32640	
Crossley	1	Putnam		
Crossroads	1	Pinellas	33710	
Crow	1	Washington		
Crown Point	1	Orange	32787	
Crows Bluff	1	Lake	32720	
Crystal Beach	1	Pinellas	34681	
Crystal Lake	1	Broward		
Crystal Lake	1	Polk	33801	
Crystal Lake	1	Washington	32463	
Crystal River	1	Citrus	34428	
Crystal Springs	1	Pasco	33524	
Cubitis	1	DeSoto	33821	
Cudjoe	1	Monroe	33042	
Cudjoe Key	1	Monroe		
Cudjoe Key Air Force Station	1	Monroe		
Cumbee	1	Polk	33801	
Cummings	1	Indian River		
Cumpressco	1	Sumter		
Cunningham Estates	1	Pasco		
Curlew	1	Pinellas	33515	
Curtis	1	Gilchrist	32619	
Curtis Mill	1	Wakulla	32358	
Cutler	1	Miami-Dade		
Cutler Bay	1	Miami-Dade	33157	
Cutler Ridge	1	Miami-Dade		
Cutlers	1	Citrus		
Curryville	1	Levy		
Cypress	1	Broward	33060	
Cypress	1	Jackson	32432	
Cypress Creek Village	1	Orange		
Cypress Gardens	1	Polk	33884	
Cypress Harbor	1	Broward		
Cypress Isles Estates	1	Broward		
Cypress Lake	1	Lee		
Cypress Lake Estates	1	Volusia	32720	
Cypress Lakes	1	Palm Beach		
Cypress Point	1	Putnam		
Cypress Quarters	1	Okeechobee	33472	

== See also ==
- Florida
- List of municipalities in Florida
- List of former municipalities in Florida
- List of counties in Florida
- List of census-designated places in Florida
