= Chula Vista (disambiguation) =

Chula Vista, California is a city in Southern California.

Chula Vista may also refer to:

- Chula Vista (Missouri), a summit in Missouri
- Chula Vista, Texas (disambiguation), several places

== See also ==
- Chula Vista Isles
