= Crystal Lake, Wisconsin =

Crystal Lake, Wisconsin may refer to:

- Crystal Lake, Barron County, Wisconsin, a town
- Crystal Lake, Marquette County, Wisconsin, a town
- Crystal Lake (Vilas County, Wisconsin), a lake
- Crystal Lake (Waukesha County, Wisconsin), a lake
