= Watertown Council =

Watertown Council may refer to:

- Watertown Council (Wisconsin)
- Watertown Council (New York)
