= Three Harbors Council =

Local council of the Boy Scouts of America

Three Harbors Council (#636)
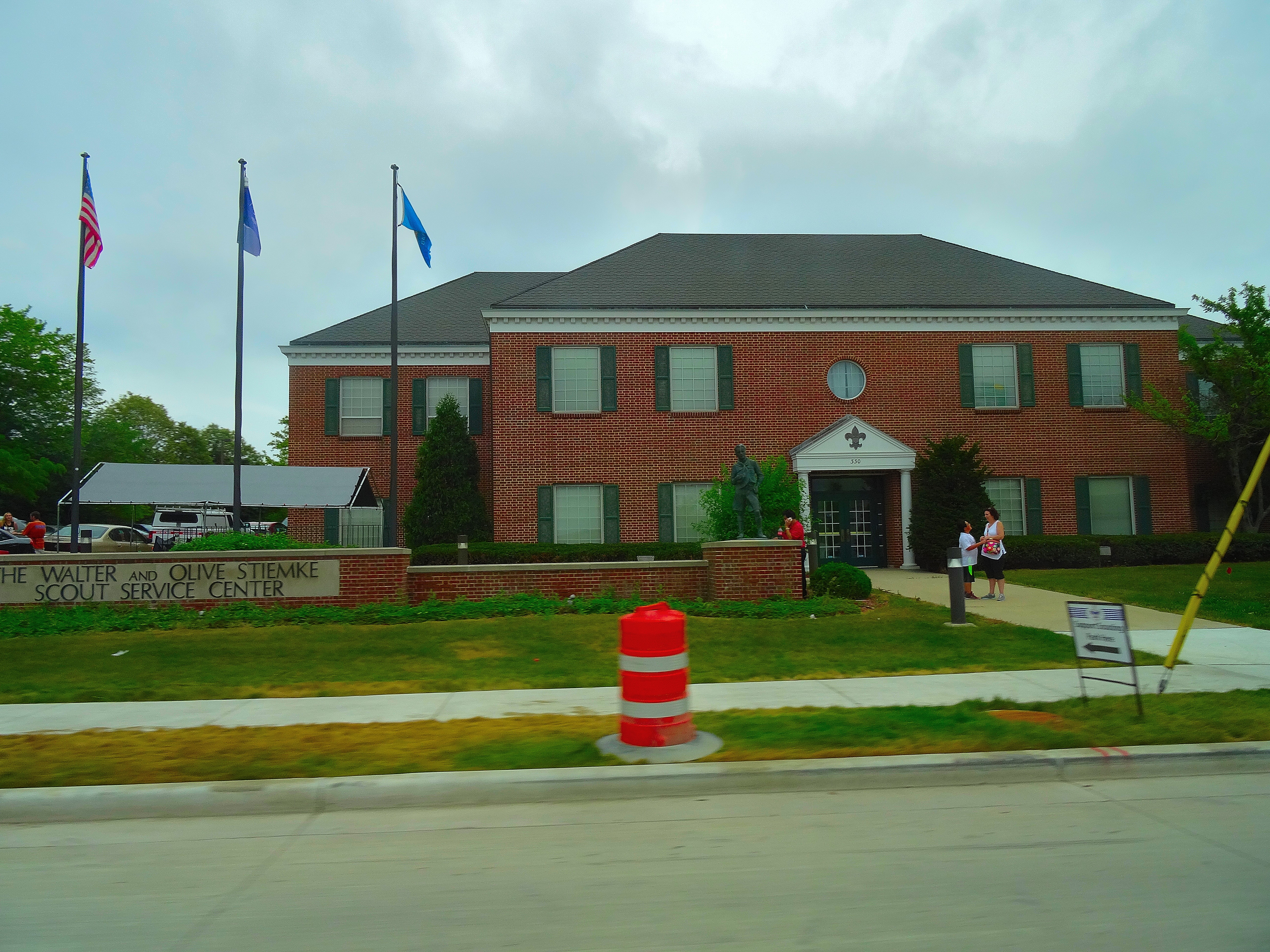
- The Walter And Olive Stiemke Scout Service Center

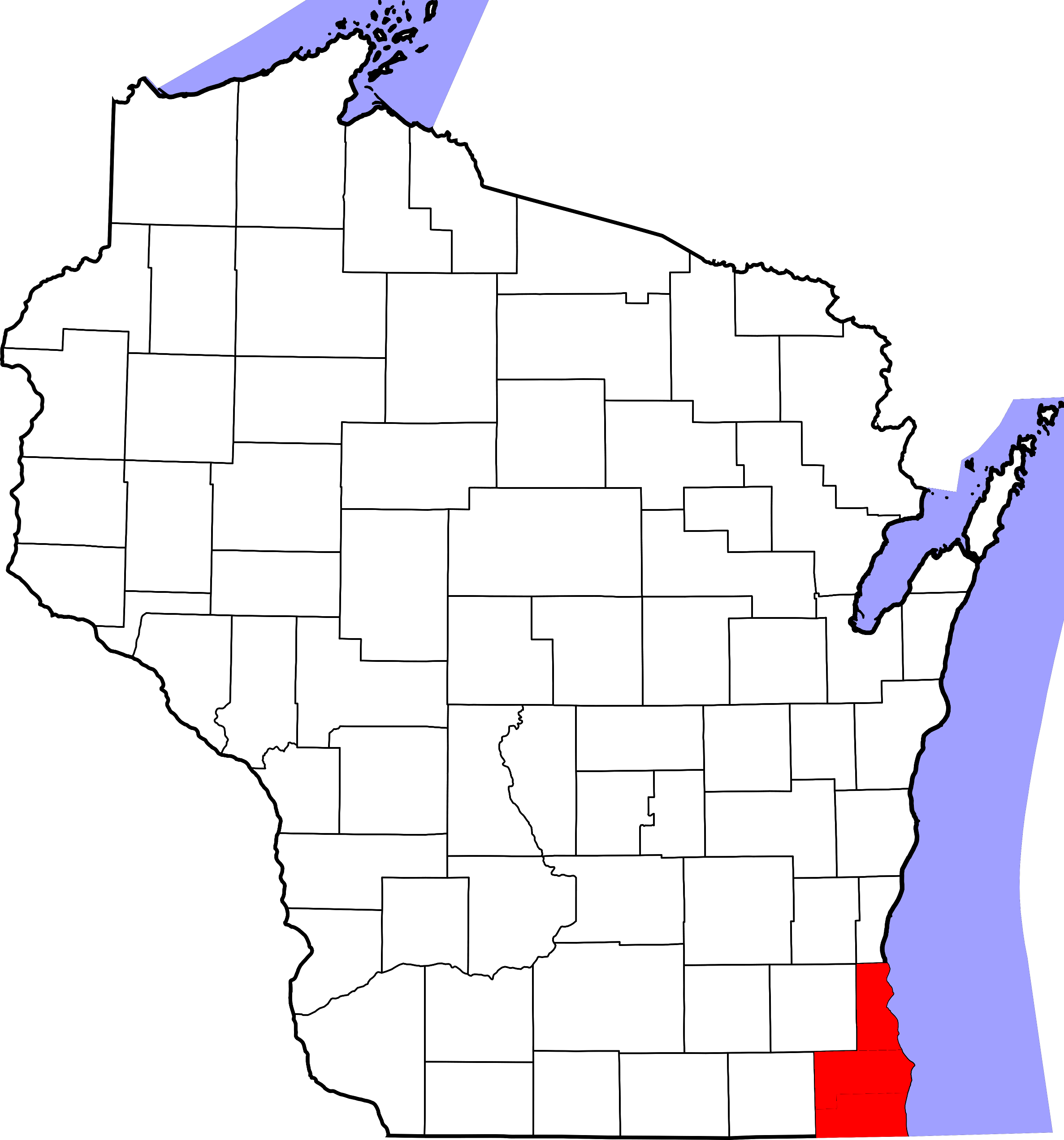
- Area of Wisconsin served by Three Harbors Council
- Owner: Boy Scouts of America
- Headquarters: Milwaukee, Wisconsin
- Country: United States
- Founded: 2011
- Membership: ▼3,260 (Youth June 2021) (24,806 Youth 2011)
- Scout Executive: Andrew Hardin
- President: Pat Stiff
- Council Commissioner: Lucia Cronin
- Website www.threeharborsscouting.org

Three Harbors Council is a local council of Scouting America, formerly known as the Boy Scouts of America, serving three southeastern Wisconsin counties: Milwaukee County, Racine County, and Kenosha County. Its name and logo refer to the three major port cities of Milwaukee, Racine, and Kenosha (in those three counties of the same name) on Lake Michigan.

== History ==
In 1915, the Milwaukee Council (#629) was formed, changing its name to the Milwaukee County Council (#629) in 1929. In 1917, the Racine Council (#631) was formed, changing its name to the Racine County Council (#631) in 1927. In 1917, the Kenosha Council (#623) was formed, changing its name to the Kenosha County Council (#623) in 1929. In 1961, the council changed its name to Kenosha Council (#623). In 1972, Kenosha Council and Racine County Council merged to become the Southeast Wisconsin Council (#634).

The council was formed from a merger of Southeast Wisconsin Council and Milwaukee County Council in 2011. Southeast Wisconsin Council was itself formed from a merger of the former Racine County Council and Kenosha Council in 1972.

Milwaukee #629 founded 1915	Racine #631 founded 1917	Kenosha #623 founded 1917
Milwaukee County #629 name change 1929	Racine County #631 name change 1927	Kenosha County #623 name change 1929
Kenosha #623 name change 1961
Southeastern Wisconsin #634 merged 1972
Three Harbors #636 merged 2011

== Districts ==
The council is subdivided into the following administrative districts:

- The Aurora District serves the northern portion of Milwaukee County (everything north of I-94 plus the west-side suburbs of West Allis and Wauwatosa). (These areas were formerly known as the Polaris, Iron Horse, and Heart of Milwaukee districts.)
- The Southern Shores District serves the southern portion of Milwaukee County (everything south of the Aurora District to the county line). (These areas were formerly known as the Root River and Southshore districts.)
- The Red Arrow District serves Kenosha County and Racine County. (These areas were formerly known as the Fox River, Gateway, and Lighthouse districts, and encompassed the entirety of the Southeastern Wisconsin Council.)
- The Scoutreach District overlays all three physical districts with outreach programs.

== Service Center ==
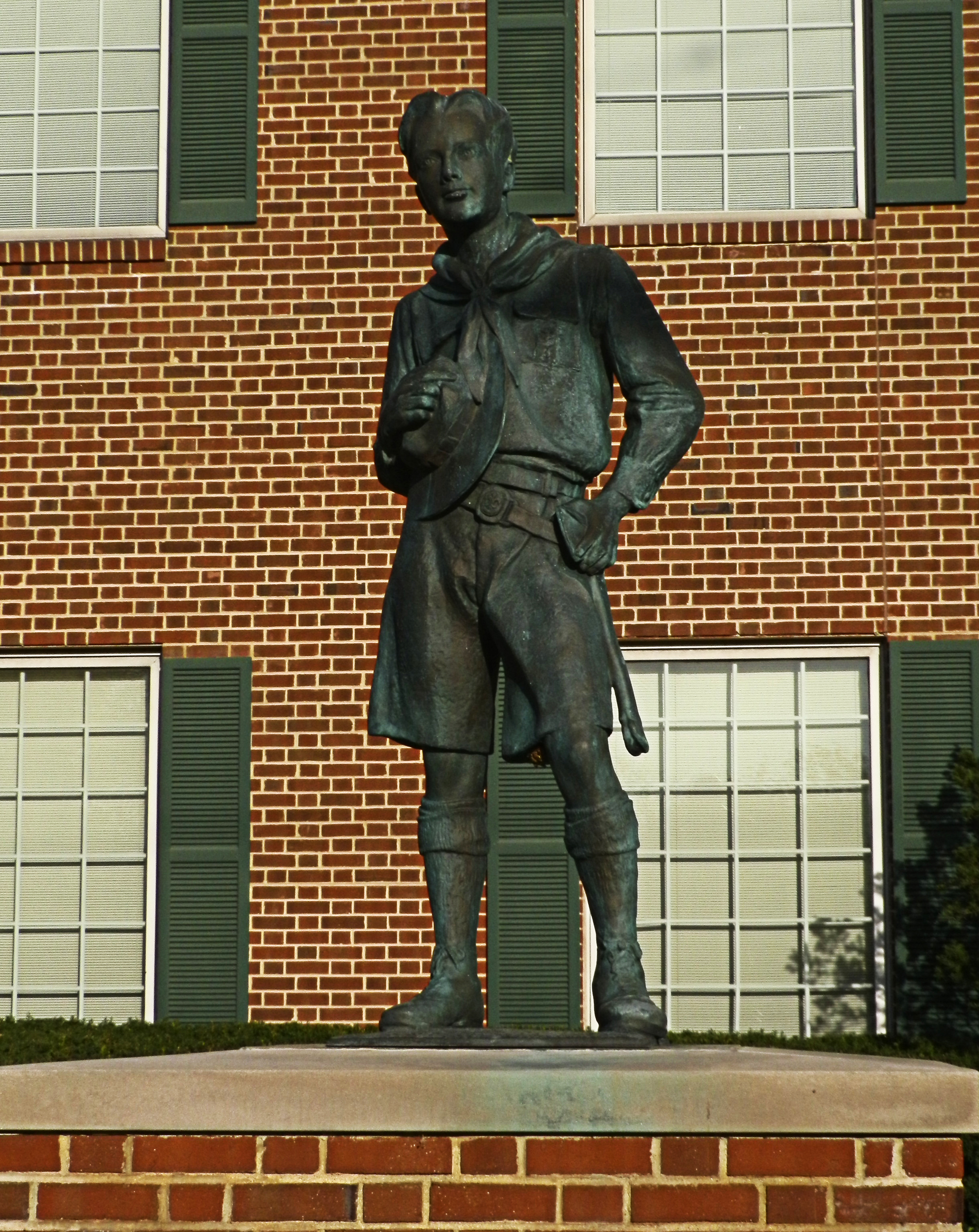
The Ideal Scout statue outside the Walter and Olive Stiemke Scout Service Center near Milwaukee, Wisconsin.

In 1911 Milwaukee established a Scout office on East Mason Street between North Water Street and North Broadway. As Scouting became more popular, a larger office was leased in 1959 at West 37th Street and West Wisconsin Avenue. The need for a new building became apparent as a result of a long-range study completed by community leaders in 1977; after several years of study and planning, the architectural firm of Plunkett Keymar Reginato designed the building. In 1980, an initial gift of $220,000 from Wayne F. Weiss Trust enabled the council to purchase and begin to develop the property. Other funding came from a variety of sources—-the largest contribution of $500,000 being from Walter and Olive Stiemke. Upon the completion of the building in June 1985, the employees of Gammex Inc. donated a replica of The Ideal Scout. The bronze life-size sculpture of a Scout in uniform is 5 feet 10 inches (1.78 m) high and rests on a brick pedestal. It is a copy of the 1915 original and was cast in 1985.

== Camps ==
Three Harbors Council camps (click on markers for Geohack maps)

=== Camp Oh-Da-Ko-Ta ===
Camp Oh-Da-Ko-Ta, located in Burlington, Wisconsin, offers complete year-round facilities for Cub Scout packs, Scouts BSA troops, and Venturing Crews (42.608816°N 88.294639°W). The camp encompasses 185 acres (0.7 km^{2}) of beautiful rolling hills and woodlands including waterfront on Dyer Lake.

After camping at the lake in 1927, 73 acres of farmland were purchased by Kenosha businessman Charles Nash (of Nash Motor Company) and donated to the Kenosha council in 1929. Buildings were constructed in the spring of 1929, and the campground was named Oh-Da-Ko-Ta in a dedication ceremony on July 21, 1929.

== Former camps ==
Former camps of Three Harbors and its predecessor councils (click on markers for Geohack maps)

In the early years of Scouting, troops would often receive permission to set up temporary camps on privately owned land. For example, the early Racine council set up a cabin they called "Wigwam" in the River Bend area above Horlick's Dam (42°45′53.9″N 87°49′33.0″W), which was a popular place for camping by families and local clubs. Eventually, councils began buying or renting land to form larger and more permanent camps. This table summarizes the camps that were used over the years by Three Harbors Council and its parent councils. (Details and sources can be found in each subsection below the table.)

Camp	Began	Ended	Duration (yrs)
Backus	circa 1925	after 1947	23 or more
Chickagami	1916 or 1920	1936	17 or 21
Chippecotton	1936	1962	27
Davidson (1)	1933	1938	6
Davidson (2)	before 1956	before 2011	unknown
Deerhaven	1951	1971	21
Freeman	1947	before 1956	unknown
Indian Mound	1917	2022	105
Journal (1)	1922	1946	25
Journal (2)	1946	1972	27
Journal (3)	1972	1997	26
Ka-Ha-Gon	1967	1971	5
LeFeber	1930	2015	86
Lyle	1962	2015	54
Oh-Dah-Ko-Tah	1924	1929	6

=== Indian Mound Scout Reservation ===
Indian Mound Scout Reservation (IMR) was operated from 1917 through 2022. It was named for the 'turtle' Native American mound at the camp in Oconomowoc, Wisconsin, off of Silver Lake. During the summer months, IMR catered primarily to the council's Cub Scouts. IMR hosted several Cub Scout day camps in cooperation with several nearby councils, including Northeast Illinois Council and Potawatomi Area Council. On a year-round basis, Scouts BSA, Cub Scout and Venturing units (and non-Scouting groups) could rent the cabins and other facilities. The main attractions of the camp included a mine-themed program area, a castle, a wooden land ship, mini golf course, and a sand beach.

Beginning November 1, 2022, Three Harbors Council ceased operations at Indian Mound Scout Reservation. This decision was driven by the Council's financial obligations in the BSA's bankruptcy settlement. The 292.5-acre property was sold in 2023 to the Forest County Potawatomi Community for US$6.5 million.

=== LeFeber Northwoods Camps ===
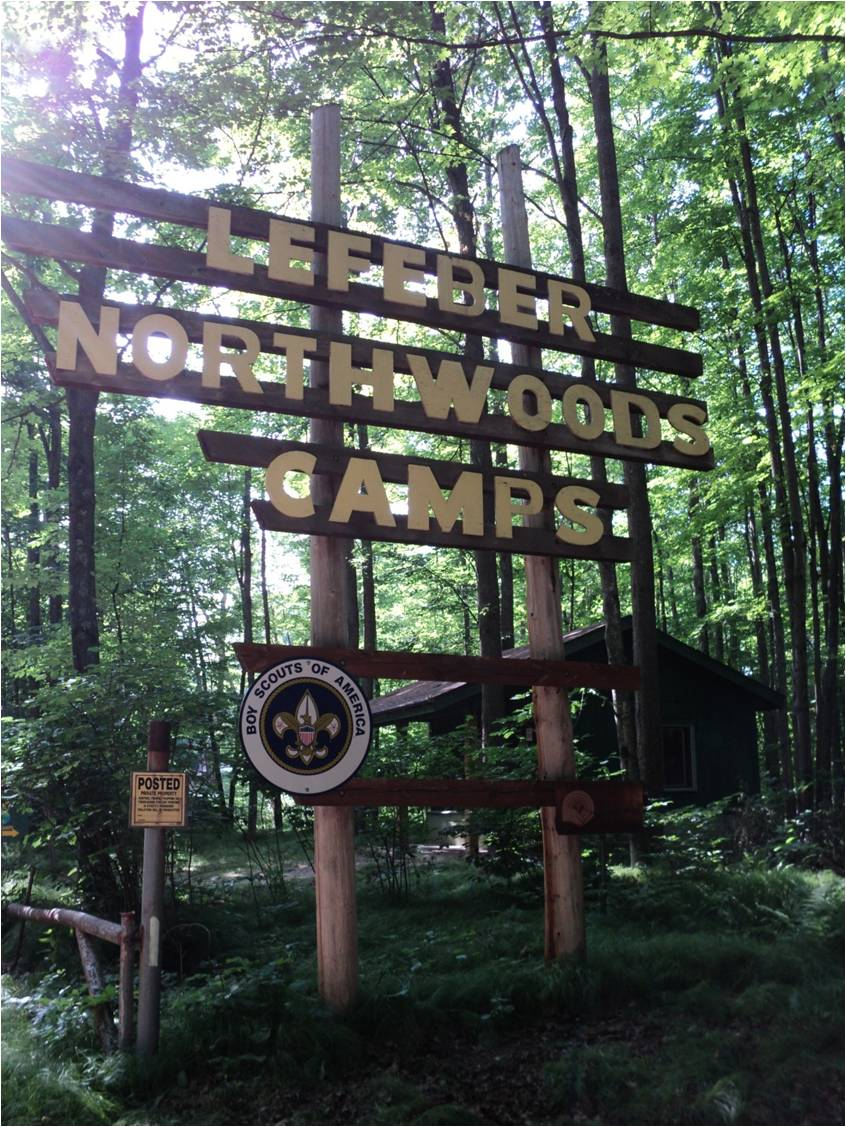
Main entrance to LeFeber in 2011

Three Harbors Council decided in 2015 to close its LeFeber Northwoods Camps, which had served the Boy Scouts of the Milwaukee County Council and then the Three Harbors Council.

The property is located near Laona, Wisconsin on Hardwood Lake (45.510535°N 88.763860°W). The camp had an extensive history as a logging camp prior to its purchase and donation to the council in 1930. It primarily served Boy Scout summer camps and featured an excellent program drawing in campers from Michigan, Illinois, and several councils located in Wisconsin. The property is 1,120 acres (5 km^{2}) of sub-boreal Wisconsin wilderness around Hardwood Lake with a deeply ingrained history in the region's timber industry. The camp was established in 1930 on land formerly owned by several timber companies, nestled in the midst of the Chequamegon-Nicolet National Forest, where Scouts had access to hundreds of miles of hiking, biking, and boating opportunities.

When it was operated by Milwaukee County Council and Three Harbors Council, it offered a wide variety of program features (including archaeology, bike treks, blacksmithing, climbing and rappelling, fly fishing, golf, horseback riding, rifle & shotgun shooting, tomahawk throwing, whitewater rafting, and windsurfing) and merit badges (from archery to woodcarving, nature study to cooking). It used the patrol cooking method.

On December 11, 2015, the camp was sold to James Flannery, who started logging part of the camp. A non-profit organization called The Baden-Powell Northwoods Experience (not affiliated directly with Boy Scouts of America but consisting of many current and former members of BSA) negotiated with the owner and operated the camp under the name "LeFeber Northwoods Camps", to offer four one-week programs for Boy Scouts and Cub Scouts in the summer of 2016.

=== Robert S. Lyle Scout Reservation ===
The Robert S. Lyle Scout Reservation was a 640 acres (2.6 km^{2}) wilderness Boy Scout Camp. The reservation, located 25 miles (40 km) northeast of Antigo, Wisconsin, encompassed two lakes, Aninnan and Perch, and had the Wolf River running through it (45.409307°N 89.0633413°W).

Like LeFeber, Lyle was one of the few Scout camps that used patrol cooking, where food is provided, but the Scouts cook the meals themselves. The camp offered a dining hall option but the vast majority of troops elected to participate in patrol cooking. Lyle was one of the few Scout camps that ran an open program, meaning Scouts were free to work on merit badges or do activities of their choice during program time. This unique structure helped teach the Scouts time management as they figured out which part of camp they want to experience next.

Lyle was established in 1962 and closed in 2015. The Scout Reservation was named in honor of Robert S. Lyle, a B-17 Bomber of the 338th Bombardment Group who lost his life on a mission on July 29, 1944. Lyle was a resident of Racine, and was 23 years old at the time of his death. His family donated the land to the Racine County Council.

=== Journal (Erin) ===
The Milwaukee Journal originally donated land in 1922 to the former Milwaukee County Council for a Scout camp that was named Camp Journal. This first camp was located on 7.5 acres (0.030 km^{2}) on Watertown Plank Road west of Highway 100 in Wauwatosa (43.0448°N 88.0546°W), which is now part of Underwood Creek Parkway. However, this site was small and quickly surrounded by development, so the Journal helped the Scouts buy a 45-acre (0.18 km^{2}) plot northwest of North Avenue and Lilly Road in Brookfield (43.0663°N 88.0937°W), moving Camp Journal to this site in 1946. Finally in 1972, the camp was moved to its current 300-acre (1.2 km^{2}) site in the town of Erin near Hartland (43.2094°N 88.3763°W). Camp Journal was sold to Quad/Graphics in 1997 and is now known as Camp/Quad. Quad/Graphics allows Scout units to use the camp several weekends each year, at which time Scouts refer to it as "Camp Erin". The company established a conservation easement on the land in 2009, so it can never be developed.

=== Ka-Ha-Gon ===
Located at 42.7500°N 88.2310°W, Camp Ka-Ha-Gon was purchased by the former Racine Council in 1967. It was sold to a private foundation when the Racine and Kenosha councils merged in 1971, and they sold it to the Racine County park system in 1982. It is now known as W.R. Wadewitz Nature Camp and is still occasionally used by Scout units looking for a rustic camping experience near home. Wadewitz Nature Center is also the beneficiary of many Eagle Projects, seeing around 3 per year between 2000 and 2022.

=== Chippecotton ===
Land for Camp Chippecotton was donated to the former Racine Council in 1936. This camp was on the shore of Pleasant Lake (42.7859°N 88.5540°W) in Walworth County, across the lake from Girl Scout camps Pottawatomi Hills (42.7822°N 88.5444°W) and Juniper Knoll (42.792372°N 88.553093°W). The camp was referred to generically ("the Boy Scout camp at Pleasant Lake") for many years, receiving the name "Chippecotton" (from a Menominee Indian name for the Root River) in a contest in 1953. The camp was sold in 1962, because its 100-Scout capacity was now too small for the council, and the proceeds of the sale were used to develop the recently acquired Camp Lyle.

=== Deerhaven ===
The camp was given to the former Kenosha Council in 1951, and it was sold when Racine and Kenosha Councils merged in 1971.

=== Freeman ===
Camp Freeman was donated to the former Racine Council in 1947 by realtor L. L. Freeman on land at the current location of Colonial Park (42.7363°N 87.8179°W). It was still active in 1951, being used by Scouts for events such as picnics, overnight campouts, and leader training; however, it must have been sold to Racine soon afterwards, because Colonial Park is listed as one of the city's largest parks in 1956.

=== Davidson ===
This camp was operated by the former Milwaukee County Council in the town of Franklin near Puetz Road west of Highway 41. The land that was formerly Camp Arthur Davidson is now the site of Franklin Woods Nature Center (42.8866°N 87.9631°W), owned by the city of Franklin. It was named after one of the founders of Harley-Davidson, who bought the land and donated it to the Boy Scouts. He also donated another camp in 1933, which was sold in 1938 and became Brown Deer Park (43.1593°N 87.9526°W). In the 1970s, Camp Davidson was the southern terminus of the annual Root River Trail anniversary hike sponsored by Badger Trails Association. The northern terminus was at Greenfield Park. The hike to Davidson was ideal for working on the Hiking Merit Badge as a 15-mile hike. Adding a loop through Whitnall Park turned the hike into a 20 miler for those who needed a longer hike for the badge.

=== Backus ===
This camp was operated by the former Milwaukee County Council on the shore of Lake Michigan north of Milwaukee. It was near Doctor's Park in Fox Point, south of what is now the Schlitz Audubon Nature Center. The exact location is unknown, although there was an August Backus living nearby at 1820 E Fox Lane. The exact dates of operation are also unknown and available information is contradictory. One troop was known to have used it from 1925 to 1929 and then planned to move its buildings to somewhere less civilized, but other reports refer to Camp Backus as one of Milwaukee's main camps in 1938 and 1947, suggesting there may have been two locations called by the same name.

=== Chickagami ===
This camp was in operation from approximately 1916 or 1920 until 1936 and owned by the Consumer's Ice Company of Burlington, WI, but operated with their permission by the Racine County Council. This camp was located on Norton's / Rockland Lake in Burlington, where YMCA Camp MacLean is located today. In late 1936 Camp Chickagami's buildings were dismantled and moved to the new Camp Chippecotton property on Pleasant Lake.

=== Oh-Dah-Ko-Tah ===
The Kenosha council rented the McGuire estate on Camp Lake / Center Lake in 1924 and 1925, operating it as "Oh-Dah-Ko-Tah". This land was bought by Henry Barstow in 1926, and the council acquired 30 acres on the southwest shore of lower Camp Lake instead (42.520519°N 88.150212°W). This land was probably sold in 1929, when the name was reused for a larger camp property on Dyer Lake.

== Scout Heritage Museum ==
Located at 330 South 84th Street in Milwaukee, the Scout Heritage Museum seeks to show the history of Scouting in the Milwaukee area and southeastern Wisconsin as well as national Scouting history. Featured in the museum are historical photographs, rare Scouting books, badges, awards, memorabilia from jamborees and camporees, old uniforms and equipment, and author and illustrator W. Ben Hunt's collection of neckerchief slides and artifacts.

== Order of the Arrow ==
Upon its founding, the Three Harbors Council was temporarily served by two lodges:

- Mascoutens Lodge #8 was formed in 1972 when Oh-Da-Ko-Ta Lodge #153 (chartered in 1939) and Chippecotton Lodge #524 (chartered in 1957) were merged as part of the Racine County Council and Kenosha County Council merger that formed Southeast Wisconsin Council.
- Mikano Lodge #231 was founded in 1943. Its name means "Turtle" in the Ho Chunk language.

The terms of the Three Harbors Council merger (dated October 1, 2011) specified that the two lodges should determine how best to consolidate within 18 months of the council merger. In 2012, the Lodge Creation Committee was formed of equal numbers of youth from each lodge with limited adult involvement, aside from the lodge's primary advisers. This committee met multiple times leading up to the 2012 summer camp season to decide on the Lodge Executive Committee structure, how the new lodge is going to utilize all four camps, a chapter system for the larger geographic area, the officers and election cycle, etc. The committee solicited lodge name, totem, and patch ideas from the membership through July 1, 2012.

On the morning of July 8, 2012, the youth of the committee decided and voted on the new name and totem. The decision became official at 10:08 am at LeFeber Northwoods Camps. It was announced that the name and totem would be unveiled at the New Lodge Kickoff on October 20, 2012. However, it was not until January 6, 2013, that the Kanwa tho Lodge #636, was unveiled by the youth committee that created it. The Kanwa tho Lodge is named after a subgrouping of the Potawatomi tribe of Indians headquartered in Milwaukee, Wisconsin. Their totem is the panther, as Kanwa tho translates to "Panther Band".

Kanwa tho Lodge is subdivided into three Chapters, each serving one physical district of Three Harbors Council. The Eluwak Chapter serves the Aurora District, the Tèhink Sipu Chapter serves the Southern Shores District, and Wikiak Sabbeleu Chapter serves the Red Arrow District.

Kanwa tho Lodge is also divided into groups of committees led by Vice Chiefs. The Vice Chief of Chapters is a youth in charge of overseeing the three chapters, the Vice Chief of Administration is in charge of the Secretary and Financial Officers, as well as the Membership, Communications, Historian, and Recognition chairmen. The Vice Chief of Program is in charge of the Ceremonies & Dance, Activities, SNARE (Section, National, and Regional Events), Inductions, and Training chairmen.

Effective June 15, 2022, the organization of the Lodge Executive Committee will change to a brand new structure. The Lodge Secretary, Lodge Treasurer, the three chapter chiefs, and four other appointed positions will report directly to the Lodge Chief, while the new Lodge Vice Chief of Operations oversees the Communications, Fellowship, Service, and Vigil chairmen and the Lodge Vice Chief of Inductions will oversee the Unit Elections, Ceremonies, Ordeal, and Brotherhood chairmen.

Mikano #231 founded 1943	Oh-Da-Ko-Ta #153 founded 1939	Chippecotton #524 founded 1957
Mascoutens #8 merged 1972
Kanwa tho #636 merged 2013

== See also ==
- Scouting in Wisconsin
- Local council camps of the Boy Scouts of America - Wisconsin
