= Crystal Lakes =

Crystal Lakes may refer to:

- Crystal Lakes, Missouri, United States
- Crystal Lakes, New Jersey, United States
- Crystal Lakes, Ohio, United States

== See also ==
- Crystal Lake (disambiguation)
