= Silver Lake, Ohio =

- Village
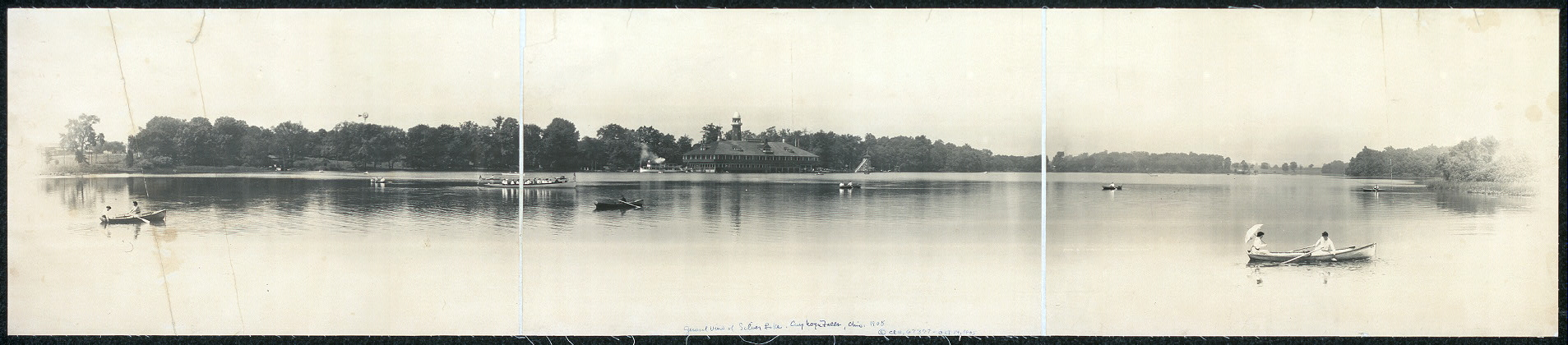

- Location in Summit County and the state of Ohio
- Coordinates: 41°09′34″N 81°27′38″W
- Country: United States
- State: Ohio
- County: Summit
- Founded: 1918
- Incorporated: 1918

Government
  - Mayor: Therese Dunphy

Area
  - Total: 1.60 sq mi (4.15 km^{2})
  - Land: 1.42 sq mi (3.68 km^{2})
  - Water: 0.18 sq mi (0.47 km^{2})
- Elevation: 994 ft (303 m)

Population (2020)
  - Total: 2,516
  - Density: 1,768.8/sq mi (682.92/km^{2})
- Time zone: UTC-5 (EST)
  - Summer (DST): UTC-4 (EDT)
- ZIP code: 44224
- Area code: 330
- FIPS code: 39-72494
- GNIS feature ID: 1087016
- Website: http://www.villageofsilverlake.com

Silver Lake is a village in Summit County, Ohio, United States. The population was 2,516 at the 2020 census. It is a suburb of Akron and is part of the Akron metropolitan area. Silver Lake is mostly surrounded by the cities of Stow and Cuyahoga Falls, and shares a small border with Munroe Falls.

== History ==
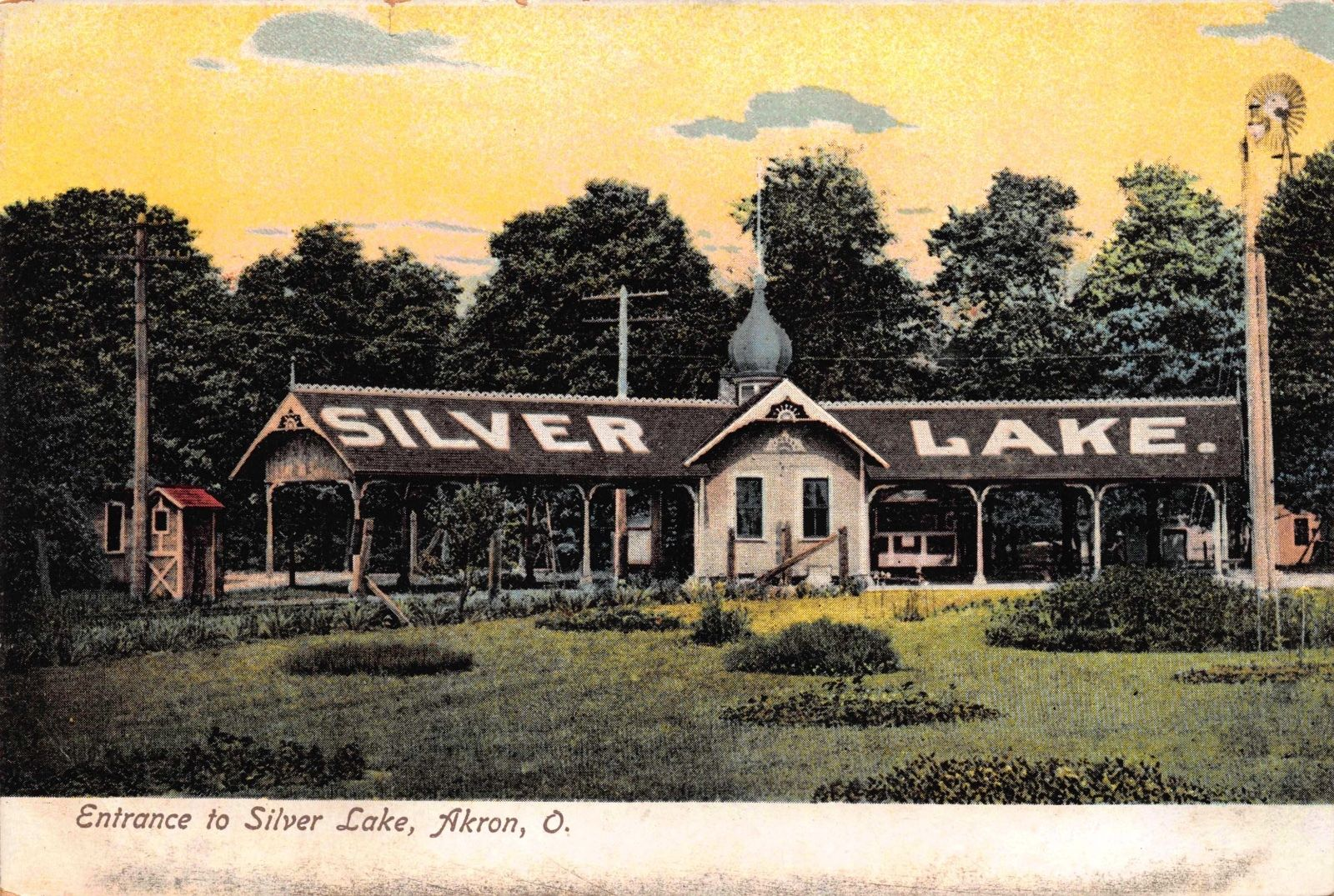
Entrance to the miniature railway at Silver Lake (around 1910)

Beginning in 1874, the lake and the land surrounding it was a popular amusement park in the Akron area. The lake was acquired in 1874 by Ralph H. Lodge, and he subsequently also purchased the land surrounding the body of water. It was originally a picnicking and swimming area, but before it closed, the 600-acre Silver Lake Amusement Park featured animal exhibits, a roller coaster, sport facilities, a dance hall, and a hotel, becoming one of the "biggest attractions in Ohio." In its prime, the Silver Lake Amusement Park received over 10,000 visitors per day. It was sold in 1917 and subdivided for residential development, leading to the incorporation of the village in 1918.

== Geography ==
According to the United States Census Bureau, the village has a total area of 1.60 square miles (4.14 km^{2}), of which 0.18 square miles (0.47 km^{2}) is covered by water.

The village includes two lakes: Silver Lake and Crystal Lake.

== Demographics ==
Historical population
Census	Pop.	Note	%±
1920	120		—
1930	478		298.3%
1940	642		34.3%
1950	1,040		62.0%
1960	2,655		155.3%
1970	3,286		23.8%
1980	2,915		−11.3%
1990	3,052		4.7%
2000	3,019		−1.1%
2010	2,519		−16.6%
2020	2,516		−0.1%
U.S. Decennial Census

=== 2010 census ===
As of the census of 2010, 2,519 people, 1,004 households, and 789 families were residing in the village. The population density was 1,773.9 inhabitants per square mile (684.9/km^{2}). The 1,066 housing units had an average density of 750.7 per square mile (289.8/km^{2}). The racial makeup of the village was 96.9% White, 0.6% African American, 0.1% Native American, 1.5% Asian, 0.1% Pacific Islander, 0.2% from other races, and 0.6% from two or more races. Hispanics or Latinos of any race were 1.3% of the population.

Of the 1,004 households, 28.0% had children under 18 living with them, 69.9% were married couples living together, 6.3% had a female householder with no husband present, 2.4% had a male householder with no wife present, and 21.4% were not families; 19.2% of all households were made up of individuals, and 9.9% had someone living alone who was 65 or older. The average household size was 2.50, and the average family size was 2.85.

The median age in the village was 49.9 years. Its age distribution was 20.5% under 18. 5.7% from 18 to 24; 15.3% from 25 to 44; 38.9% from 45 to 64; and 19.7% were 65 years of age or older. The gender makeup of the village was 49.8% male and 50.2% female.

=== 2000 census ===
As of the census of 2000, 3,019 people, 1,235 households, and 918 families were residing in the village. The population density was 2,129.2 inhabitants per square mile (822.1/km^{2}). The 1,316 housing units averaged 928.1 per square mile (357.8/km^{2}). The racial makeup of the village was 98.24% White, 0.13% African American, 0.10% Native American, 0.70% Asian, 0.17% from other races, and 0.66% from two or more races. Hispanics or Latinos of any race were 0.79% of the population.

Of the 1,235 households, 27.3% had children under 18 living with them, 68.6% were married couples living together, 4.5% had a female householder with no husband present, and 25.6% were not families. About 23.9% of all households were made up of individuals, and 17.7% had someone living alone who was 65 or older. The average household size was 2.43, and the average family size was 2.88.

In the village, the age distribution was 22.7% under 18, 3.8% from 18 to 24, 19.1% from 25 to 44, 27.2% from 45 to 64, and 27.1% who were 65 age or older. The median age was 48 years. For every 100 females, there were 89.8 males. For every 100 females age 18 and over, there were 84.4 males.

The median income for a household in the village was $70,875, and for a family was $79,286. Males had a median income of $64,265 versus $38,529 for females. The per capita income for the village was $35,614. About 1.1% of families and 2.8% of the population were below the poverty line, including none under age 18 and 6.8% of those age 65 or over.

== Transportation ==
From 1902 to 1917 the Miniature Railway at Silver Lake operated in the recreation park at Silver Lake.
