= Crystal Pool =

Crystal Pool may refer to:

== Swimming pools and natatoriums ==
- Crystal Pool (Seattle), a former natatorium and event center in Seattle, Washington, US
- Crystal Pool, a swimming pool at Knoebels Amusement Resort, Elysburg, Pennsylvania, US
- Crystal Pool and Fitness Centre, in Victoria, Canada
- Crystal Pool at Sunset Beach in Vancouver, Canada, 1928—1974, replaced by the Vancouver Aquatic Centre
- Crystal Pool, a former swimming pool at Glen Echo Park in Glen Echo, Maryland, US
- Crystal Pool, a former swimming pool at Keansburg Amusement Park in Keansburg, New Jersey, US

== Natural pools ==
- Crystal Pool, a pool in Ash Meadows, Nevada, US, home to the Crystal Spring springsnail
- Crystal Pool, a rock pool in Norfolk Island, Australia, as listed in Postage stamps and postal history of Norfolk Island

== See also ==
- Crystal Lake (disambiguation)
