= Scouting in Wisconsin =

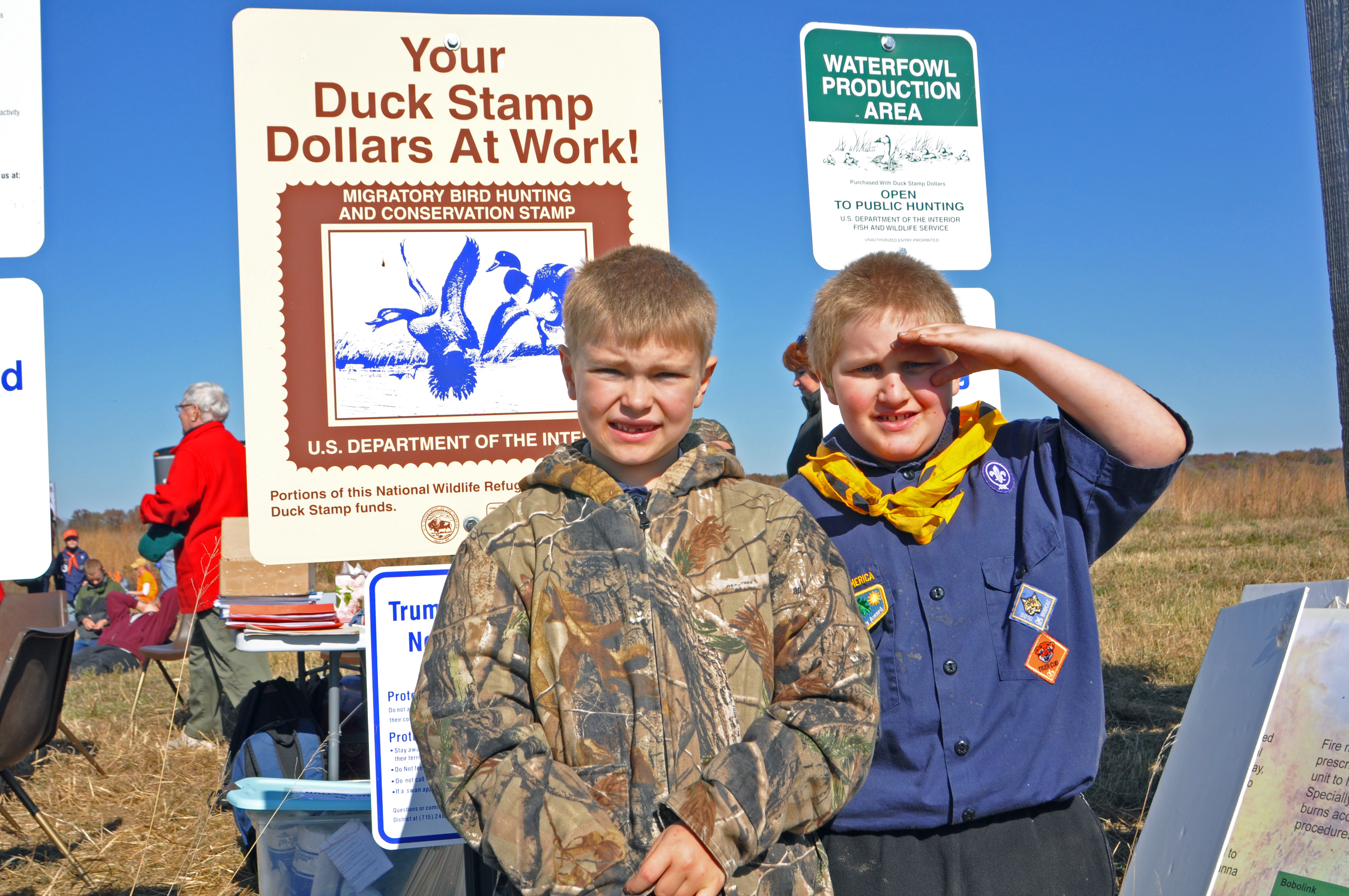
- Cub Scouts

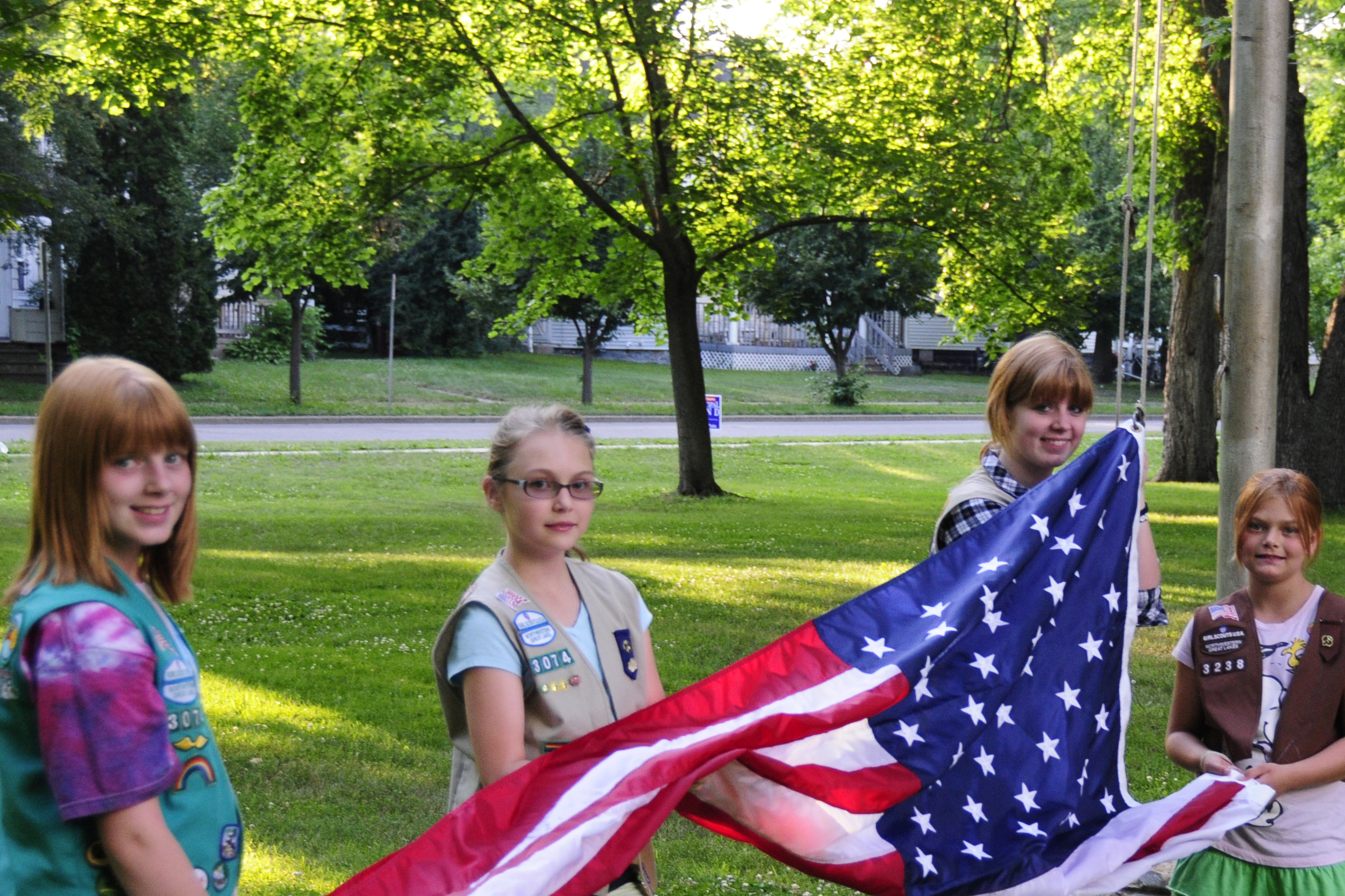
- Eau Claire Girl scouts

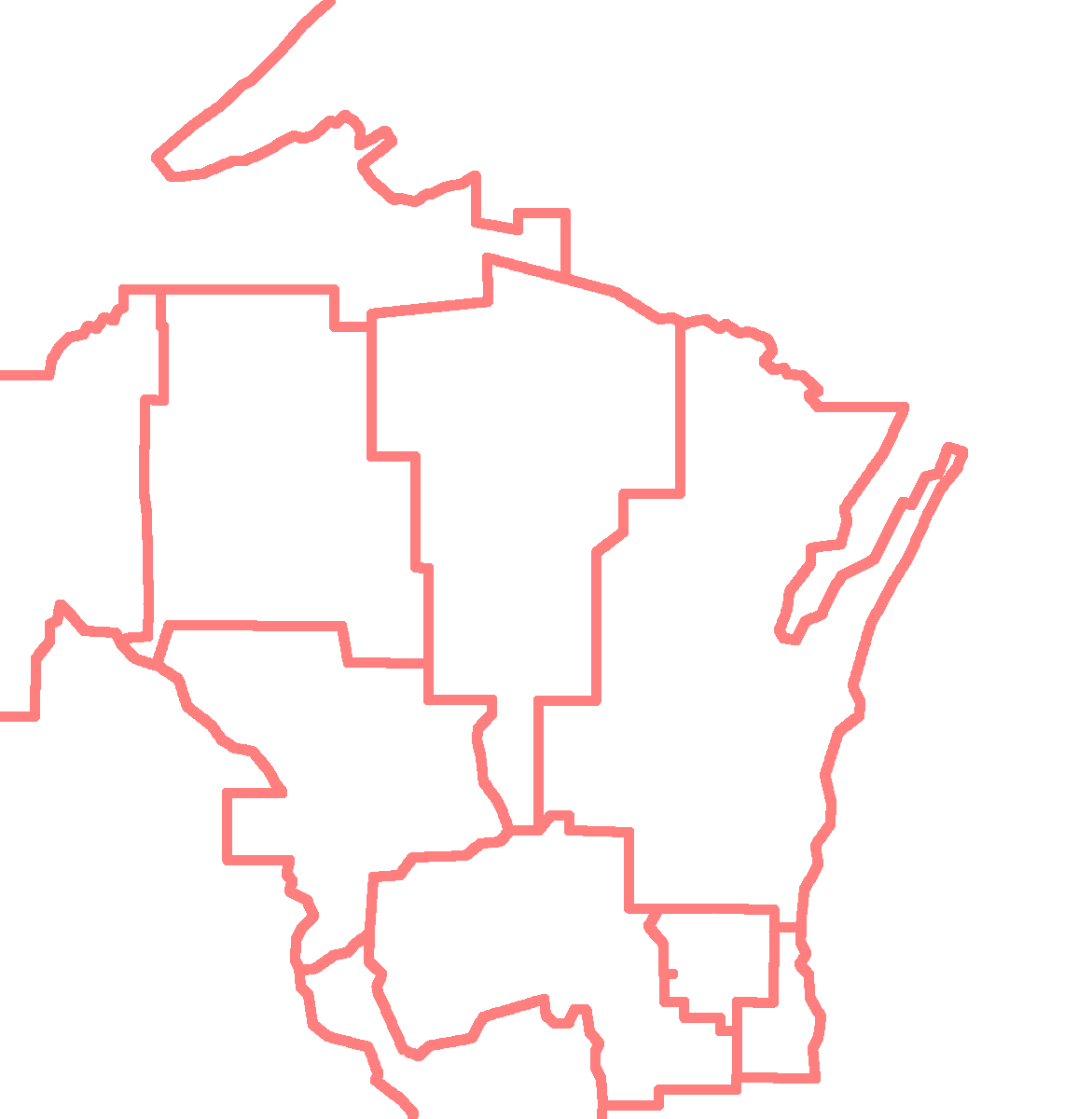
Scouting America councils serving Wisconsin

Wisconsin's history with the Boy Scouts and Girl Scouts spans from 1910 to the present day. Both programs have independently served thousands of youth in programs that suit the environment in which they live.

== Early history (1910–1950) ==
In 1920, the Appleton Council, and the Neenah-Menasha Council were both formed. They merged to become the Valley Council (#635) in 1922. In 1924 Valley Council changed its name to the Fox River Valley Council (#635), changing it back to Valley in 1925. In 1920, the Fond Du Lac Council (#622) was founded, changing its name to the Badger Council (#622) in 1926. In 1919, the Manitowoc Council (#625) was formed, changing its name to the Manitowoc County Council (#625) in 1929, changing its name to the Waumegasako Council (#625) in 1940. The Waumegasako Council merged into the Bay-Lakes Council (#635) in 1973. In 1920, the Green Bay Council was founded, closing in 1922. In 1930, the Green Bay Area Council was founded again, changing its name to the Nicollet Area Council (#621) in 1934. In 1919, the Oshkosh Council (#630) was founded, changing its name to the Twin Lakes Council (#630) in 1935. In 1919, the Sheboygan County Council (#632) was founded, changing its name to the Kettle Moraine Council (#632) in 1935.

The Oconomowoc Council was formed in 1917. It disbanded in 1921. The Janesville Council was formed in 1917. It disbanded in 1917. The Sturgeon Bay Council was formed in 1918. It disbanded in 1919. The Ashland Council was formed in 1918. It disbanded in 1920.

Ma-Ka-Ja-Wan Scout Reservation is a Boy Scouts of America property and High Adventure base located in Northern Wisconsin and serves the Scouts of the Northeast Illinois Council based in Highland Park, Illinois. Originally a logging camp, the Scouts purchased the land and first had campers in 1929. The camp is 1,560 acres (6 km^{2}) in size.

== Recent history (1950–present) ==
The Bay-Lakes Council (#635) was formed in 1973 by a merger of the following councils: Badger (based in Fond du Lac), Waumegesako (based in Manitowoc), Nicolet Area (based in Green Bay), Valley (based in Menasha), Twin Lakes (based in Oshkosh), and Kettle Moraine (based in Sheboygan). The Hiawathaland Council joined in 2012.

== Scouting America (was Boy Scouts of America) in Wisconsin today ==
There are seven Scouting America local councils headquartered in Wisconsin. Additionally, some adjacent councils in Illinois and Minnesota serve portions of Wisconsin. Besides these councils, some out of state councils maintain camp facilities in Wisconsin.

=== Bay-Lakes Council ===
Bay-Lakes Council (#635)
- Country: United States
- Founded: 1973
- Website; Bay-Lakes Council

The Bay-Lakes Council is headquartered in Appleton, Wisconsin. Bay-Lakes Council #635 was formed on July 1, 1973, and is geographically one of the larger Scouting America councils in the United States.

Bay-Lakes Council was formed in 1973 by a merger of the following councils: Badger (based in Fond du Lac), Waumegesako (based in Manitowoc), Nicolet Area (based in Green Bay), Valley (based in Menasha), Twin Lakes (based in Oshkosh), and Kettle Moraine (based in Sheboygan). The Hiawathaland Council, in Michigan's UP, joined in 2012 and was transferred as a district to Michigan Crossroads Council in 2025.

=== Blackhawk Area Council ===
Blackhawk Area Council is headquartered in Rockford, Illinois and serves southwestern Wisconsin and northwestern Illinois.

=== Chippewa Valley Council ===
Chippewa Valley Council (#637)
- Country: United States
- Founded: 1928
- Website; Chippewa Valley Council

The Chippewa Valley Council is headquartered in Eau Claire.

==== History ====
In 1922, the Watertown Council was formed, disbanding in 1925. In 1927, the Chippewa Falls Council was formed, disbanding in 1928. In 1927, the Eau Claire Council (#621) was formed, changing its name to the Chippewa and Eau Claire Counties Council (#621), changing its name to the Ojibwa Council (#621) in 1925. Ojibwa became the Chippewa Valley Council (#637) in 1928.

==== Organization ====
- Blue Hills
- Clear Water
- Timber Rivers
- Glacial Trails District

==== Camps ====
- L.E. Phillips Scout Reservation (Rice Lake)
- Camp Brunswick (Eau Claire)
- Camp Barksdale (Ashland)

==== Order of the Arrow ====
- Otyokwa Lodge #337

=== Gateway Area Council ===
Gateway Area Council (#624)
- Country: United States
- Founded: 1925
- Website; Gateway Area Council

The Gateway Area Council, headquartered in La Crosse, serves Scouts in Wisconsin and Minnesota.

==== History ====
In 1921, the La Crosse Council (#624) was formed, changing its name to the Gateway Area Council in 1925.

==== Organization ====
- Seven Rivers- Houston County (MN), School District of La Crosse, Onalaska, Prairie du Chien, Stoddard
- The Great Soaring Eagle- Buffalo & Trempealeau Counties, School District of Holmen
- Winding Trails- Jackson, Monroe, Juneau, Vernon, Crawford Counties, School District of West Salem, Bangor

==== Camps ====
- Camp Decorah, located approximately 4 miles (6 km) southeast of Galesville, Wisconsin on the Black River, is 330 acres (1.3 km^{2}) of wooded sand hills that overlook the Black River. The camp is easily accessible with its main entrance on Council Bay Road, seven miles north of Holmen, WI, and four miles southeast of Galesville, WI.
- Hoffman Park provides rustic adventures near Black River Falls, WI.

==== Order of the Arrow ====
- Ni-Sanak-Tani Lodge #381

=== Glacier's Edge Council ===
Glacier's Edge Council (#628)
- Headquarters: Madison, Wisconsin
- Country: United States
- Founded: 1929
- Website; Glacier's Edge Council

The Glacier's Edge Council provides Scouting services to communities in the counties of Adams, Columbia, Dane, Dodge, Grant, Green, Iowa, Jefferson, Lafayette, Richland, Sauk, Rock, Walworth in Wisconsin as well as Winnebago and Boone counties in Illinois. It is composed of representatives of more than 250 community organizations holding charters to operate a program of the Boy Scouts of America. The council meets annually in May to elect officers and board members. It was organized in 2005 growing from a consolidation of the Four Lakes and Sinnissippi Councils and granted a charter by the Boy Scouts of America.

==== History ====
The Janesville Council was formed in 1917. It disbanded in 1917. In 1919, the Madison Council (#628) was formed, changing its name to the Four Lakes Council (#628) in 1929. In 2005, Four Lakes changed its name to Glacier's Edge Council (#628). In 1920, the Beloit Council (#620) was formed, changing its name to the Beloit Area Council (#620) in 1928. In 1925, the McHenry County Council (#695) (Illinois) was formed, merging into the Beloit Area Council (#620) in 1928. In 1920, the Beloit Area Council (#620) changed its name to the State Line Council (#620) in 1936. In 1928, the Indian Trails Council (#633) was formed. State Line and Indian Trails merged to become the Sinnissippi Council (#626) in 1966. Sinnissippi "consolidated" with Four Lakes Council of Madison to become Glacier's Edge Council (#628) in 2005.

==== Organization ====
Districts:

- Indian Trails
- Mohawk
- Wisconsin River
- Yahara

==== Camps ====
Camps:

- Ed Bryant Scout Reservation on the Castle Rock Flowage near Mauston
- Camp Indian Trails on the Rock River near Janesville (Sold in 2021 to Rock County)

==== Order of the Arrow ====
- Bigfoot Lodge (Chartered 5/5/2018 - formerly Takoda Lodge 2006–2018)

=== Northern Star Council ===
Indianhead Council merged with Viking Council in 2005 to create Northern Star Council. The Indianhead Council was headquartered in Saint Paul, Minnesota, and including Ramsey and Washington Counties in Minnesota, and much of western Wisconsin. Its name came from the shape of the Wisconsin-Minnesota border, which is said to resemble that of the head of an Indian. As well as the office building in Saint Paul, facilities included Tomahawk Scout Reservation near Rice Lake, Wisconsin, Phillippo Scout Reservation near Cannon Falls, Minnesota, Fred C. Andersen Scout Camp near Hudson, Wisconsin, and Kiwanis Scout Camp near Marine on St. Croix, Minnesota.

=== Potawatomi Area Council ===
Potawatomi Area Council (#651)
- Country: United States
- Founded: 1931
- Website; Potawatomi Area Council

The Potawatomi Area Council is headquartered in Waukesha, Wisconsin. The Potawatomi Area Council serves all of Waukesha County and portions of Dodge, Jefferson, Walworth and Washington Counties. The Wag-O-Shag Lodge is the Order of the Arrow lodge. Potawatomi Area Council has one summer camp named Camp Long Lake.

The Potawatomi Area Council (#651) was formed in 1931.

=== Samoset Council ===
Samoset Council (#62u)
- Country: United States
- Founded: 1931
- Website; Samoset Council

Samoset Council is headquartered in Weston (near Wausau), and serves the north central part of Wisconsin and was founded in 1920. It gets its name from an early Boy Scout camp in the town of Harrison, named Camp Sam-O-Set which closed in 1934, a year before the construction of Camp Tesomas.

In 1919, the Oneida County Council was formed, changing its name to the Rhinelander Council in 1922. In 1928, Rhinelander merged into Marathon and Lincoln Counties Council (#627) in 1928. In 1921, the Merrill Council (#627) was formed, merging into the Marathon and Lincoln Counties Council (#627) in 1926. In 1921, the Wausau Council (#644) was formed, merging into the Marathon and Lincoln Counties Council (#627) in 1926.

In 1917 the Wisconsin Rapids Council was formed, changing its name to Wood County in 1925. In 1921, the Stevens Point Council (#633) was formed, merging into the Wood County Council (#636) in 1927. The Wood County Council (#636) merged into the Central Wisconsin Council (#636) in 1929. Central Wisconsin merged into Samoset Council (#627) in 1937. In 1921, the Marinette Council (#626) was formed, merging into the Marathon and Lincoln Counties Council (#627) in 1930. In 1930, Marathon and Lincoln Counties changed its name to Samoset.

=== Three Harbors Council ===
Three Harbors Council (#636)
- Headquarters: Milwaukee, Wisconsin
- Country: United States
- Founded: 1931
- Website; Three Harbors Council

In 1915, the Milwaukee Council (#629) was formed, changing its name to the Milwaukee County Council (#629) in 1929. In 1917, the Racine Council (#631) was formed, changing its name to the Racine County Council (#631) in 1927. In 1917, the Kenosha Council (#623) was formed, changing its name to the Kenosha County Council (#623) in 1929. In 1961, the council changed its name to Kenosha Council (#623). In 1972, Kenosha Council and Racine County Council merged to become the Southeast Wisconsin Council (#634).

In September 2011, Southeast Wisconsin Council and Milwaukee County Council merged to form Three Harbors Council.

==== Organization ====
Districts:

- Aurora (Northern Milwaukee County, Wauwatosa, and West Allis)
- Southern Shores (Southern Milwaukee County)
- Red Arrow (Racine and Kenosha Counties)

==== Order of the Arrow ====
The Kanwa tho Lodge #636 is the Order of the Arrow lodge for Three Harbors Council. It was founded on January 6, 2013, through the consolidation of Mascoutens Lodge #8 and Mikano Lodge #231. The name and totem were chosen by the youth of the new lodge on the morning of July 8, 2012. Kanwa tho Lodge's totem is a panther, and "Kanwa tho" translates to "panther band".

=== Voyageurs Area Council ===
The Ashland Council was formed in 1918. It disbanded in 1920. Headquartered in Hermantown, Minnesota, Voyageurs Area Council serves Scouts in Minnesota, Wisconsin, and Michigan. Its Order of the Arrow Lodge is Ka'niss Ma'ingan Lodge #196. The Voyageurs Area Council closed in 2025, with the Wisconsin sections of the former council now being overseen by the Chippewa Valley Council.

== Girl Scouts of the USA ==
Girl Scouting in Wisconsin
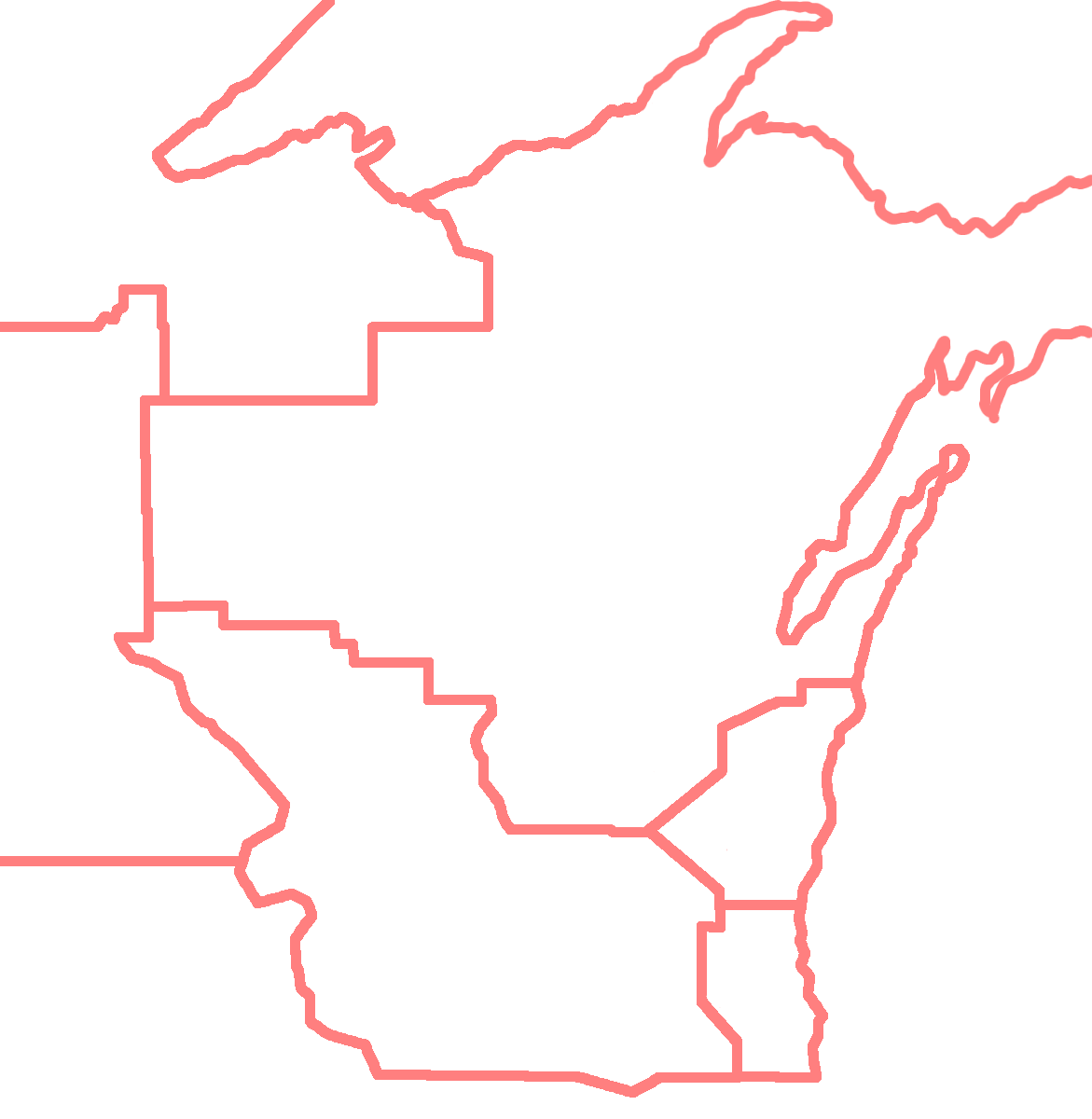
- GSUSA councils serving Wisconsin

There are six Girl Scout councils serving Wisconsin.

There are four councils of the Girl Scouts of the USA headquartered in Wisconsin. Additionally, two adjacent councils in Minnesota serve portions of Wisconsin.

=== Badgerland Council ===
Badgerland Council
- Country: United States
- Website; Badgerland Council

Badgerland Council serves more than 14,200 girls and has some 4,500 adult volunteers in south-central and south-western Wisconsin. It was formed in June 2009 by the merge of three councils and part of a fourth: Girl Scouts of Badger Council, Girl Scouts of Black Hawk Council, Girl Scouts of Riverland Council, and the Wisconsin part of Girl Scouts of Green Hills Council.

Leadership centers
Janesville, Madison, and La Crosse

Camps

- Camp Brandenberg is located northwest of Madison, and is available for use year-round.
- Camp Ehawee is located near La Crosse, and is a summer resident camp.

=== Manitou Council ===
Manitou Council
- Country: United States
- Website; Manitou Council

Manitou Council serves 7,500 girls in Calumet, Dodge, Fond du Lac, Manitowoc, Ozaukee, Sheboygan, and Washington counties in Wisconsin.

It was slated to be merged with several other councils into Girl Scouts of the Northwestern Great Lakes. In December 2008, the 7th Circuit Court of Appeals gave a preliminary injunction enjoining the national organization from changing the status of Manitou Council.

Headquarters
Sheboygan, Wisconsin

Camps

- Camp Evelyn is 240 acres near Plymouth, Wisconsin.
- Camp Manitou is 140 acres near Shoto, Wisconsin.

=== Girl Scouts of Minnesota and Wisconsin Lakes and Pines ===
This council was formed on January 1, 2008, from the merger of Girl Scouts – Land of Lakes Council, Girl Scouts – Northern Pine Council and a portion of the Peacepipe and the Pine to Prairie Councils. Only one of this council's camps is located in Wisconsin.

=== Girl Scouts of Minnesota and Wisconsin River Valleys ===
Girl Scouts of Minnesota and Wisconsin River Valleys serves 32,000 girls and 11,000 volunteers in southern Minnesota and western Wisconsin. It was created in 2007 as the result of a merger of five Minnesota councils. Only one of its camps is located in Wisconsin.

=== Girl Scouts of the Northwestern Great Lakes ===
Girl Scouts of the Northwestern Great Lakes
- Country: United States
- Website; Girl Scouts of the Northwestern Great Lakes

In partnership with over 6,000 adult volunteers, Girl Scouts of the Northwestern Great Lakes (GSNWGL) serves nearly 15,000 girls in 58 counties in northern Wisconsin and Michigan's Upper Peninsula. The council's jurisdiction spans about 400 miles from east to west and about 300 miles from north to south.

It was formed on May 1, 2008, by the merger of Girl Scouts of Birch Trails Council, Girl Scouts of the Fox River Area, Girl Scouts of Indian Waters, Girl Scouts of Lac Baie Council, Girl Scouts of Peninsula Waters and Girl Scouts of Woodland Council.

Headquarters
Appleton, Wisconsin

Camps

- Camp Birch Trails, the council's largest camp, is located near Merrill, Wisconsin.
- Camp Nesbit is located in Sidnaw, Michigan.
- Camp Winnecomac is located in Kaukauna, WI.
- Camp Sacajawea is located on the outskirts of Wisconsin Rapids, WI.
- Camp Nawakwa is located in Cornell, WI.
- Camp Del O'Claire is located near Wausau, WI. As of November 2015, it is being investigated to decide whether it should remain open.
- Camp Cuesta is located near Baileys Harbor, WI.

=== Girl Scouts of Wisconsin Southeast ===
Girl Scouts of Wisconsin Southeast
- Country: United States
- Website; Girl Scouts of Wisconsin Southeast

Girl Scouts of Wisconsin Southeast (GSWISE) serves some 33,000 girls in Kenosha, Milwaukee, Racine, Washington and Waukesha, as well as the southern part of Ozaukee and eastern parts of Dodge and Jefferson counties.

Headquarters
Milwaukee, Wisconsin

Camps and centers

- Alice Chester Center, East Troy
- Camp Pottawatomie Hills, East Troy
- Camp Winding River, Neosho
- Chinook Program Center & Activity Station, Waukesha
- Girl Scout Service Center, Racine
- Marion Chester Read Center, Milwaukee
- Silverbrook Program Center, West Bend
- Trefoil Oaks Program Center, Kenosha
- Volunteer Center/Council Office, Waukesha
- Woodhaven, Kenosha

== See also ==
- Madison Scouts Drum and Bugle Corps
- Racine Scouts Drum and Bugle Corps
