= Crystal Lake (Rice County, Minnesota) =

Lake in the state of Minnesota, United States

- Location within Minnesota
- Location: Rice County, Minnesota
- Coordinates: 44°20′1″N 93°12′45″W
- Type: Lake
- Surface elevation: 1,132 feet (345 m)

Crystal Lake is a lake in Rice County, in the U.S. state of Minnesota.

Crystal Lake was so named on account of its crystal-clear water.

== See also ==
- List of lakes in Minnesota
