= Cedar Hammock, Florida =

- Unincorporated community
- Location within Florida Location within the United States
- Coordinates: 27°28′01″N 82°34′59″W
- Country: United States
- State: Florida
- County: Manatee
- Elevation: 20 ft (6.1 m)
- Time zone: UTC-5 (EST)
  - Summer (DST): UTC-4 (EDT)
- Area code: 941
- FIPS code: 12-11175
- GNIS feature ID: 294356

Cedar Hammock is an unincorporated area in Manatee County, Florida, in the United States. Flanked by Bradenton to the north and Oneco to the south, Cedar Hammock was a hardwood hammock which became a popular location for truck farming in the early 20th century.

== History ==
Many residents of Bradenton maintained farms in Cedar Hammock. One of a few named hammocks in the area, Cedar Hammock was about 6,000 acres but only partially farm-able due to large areas of wetland. The hammock was home to several farms which grew onions, cabbage, potatoes, and other produce.

Until 1906 when a drain was dug to Ware's Creek, much of the area was water-logged by several feet.

The Cedar Hammock area did not start to experience large residential growth until the late 1940s as trailer parks began to open on former farmland along the Tamiami Trail. In 1950, the Cedar Hammock Civic Association was founded by residents to promote improvement of the area.

In 1952, the association and area residents waged and won a battle against the city over Bradenton developing a garbage dump in Cedar Hammock.

In 1957, the Cedar Hammock Fire Control District was established.
