= Chula Vista, Texas =

Chula Vista, Texas may refer to the following places in the U.S. state of Texas:

- Chula Vista, Cameron County, Texas
- Chula Vista, Maverick County, Texas
- Chula Vista, Zavala County, Texas
