= Chula Vista (Missouri) =

Summit in Missouri, United States

Coordinates: 36°41′54″N 93°14′56″W

Chula Vista is a summit in Taney County in the U.S. state of Missouri. The summit has an elevation of 1,302 feet (397 m). The summit lies along Missouri Route 248 at the intersection with Buchanan Road and is approximately four miles north of Branson.

Chula Vista was named after Chula Vista, California, by a settler who had visited the city. The name is Spanish for "pretty view".
