= College Point, Florida =

Human settlement in Florida

Coordinates: 30.252°N 85.615°W

College Point is located in Bay County, Florida, United States, and is now part of the city of Lynn Haven. The name, chosen by Mary Gaston Stollenwerck Jones, was the post office address of Bob Jones College (now Bob Jones University) built there in 1927. The college moved to Cleveland, Tennessee, in 1933, then to Greenville, South Carolina, in 1947.
