= Crystal Lake (Polk County, Minnesota) =

Lake in the state of Minnesota, United States

- Location within Minnesota
- Location: Polk County, Minnesota
- Coordinates: 47°37′40″N 96°6′10″W
- Type: Lake
- Surface elevation: 1,217 feet (371 m)

Crystal Lake is a lake in Polk County, in the U.S. state of Minnesota.

Crystal Lake was so named on account of its clear water.

== See also ==
- List of lakes in Minnesota
