= Crystal Lake (California) =

Unincorporated community in California, United States

- Location within California Location within the United States
- Coordinates: 39°19′22″N 120°34′13″W

Crystal Lake is a mountain lake in Nevada County, California. It lies at an elevation of 5738 feet (1749 m). The lake resides on private property and is not open to the public. Crystal Lake is located adjacent to the Union Pacific Railroad, 2.5 miles (4.0 km) east of Yuba Gap.
