= Crystal Lake (Ohio) =

- Location within Ohio Location within the United States
- Location: Silver Lake, Ohio
- Coordinates: 41°9′47″N 81°27′55″W
- Type: Man-made
- Basin countries: United States
- Surface area: 10 ha (25 acres)
- Surface elevation: 994 ft (303 m)

Crystal Lake is located in Silver Lake, Ohio. It is one of the two man made lakes in the village.
