= Crystal Lake (Vilas County, Wisconsin) =

- Location within Wisconsin Location within the United States
- Location: Vilas County, Wisconsin
- Coordinates: 46.002°N 89.613°W
- Type: seepage lake
- Average depth: 34 feet (10 m)
- Max. depth: 67 feet (20 m)

Crystal Lake is a lake in Vilas County, Wisconsin, one of over 22 lakes of that name. It has a surface area of about 93 acres, and is located just south of Big Muskellunge Lake, in Vilas County in the Northern Highland region of Wisconsin. The nearest community is Sayner, about 5 miles to the east. Visitors have access to the lake from a public boat landing, public beaches and the Northern Highland-American Legion State Forest. Fish include panfish, largemouth bass, and trout.

Crystal Lake is a seepage lake, having neither tributary nor effluent. The lake has a maximum depth of 67 feet and a mean depth of 34 feet. The lake has very clear water, comparable to that of Lake Tahoe in California, or Crater Lake in Oregon.

== Background ==
Crystal Lake is a kettle hole lake, meaning it was formed from glacial movement and melting and it's located in Vilas County, Wisconsin. Many kettle lakes are sealed by glacial till and have perched water tables, but Crystal Lake does not. It is not surprising that Crystal lake is a seepage lake considering most lakes in Wisconsin are also seepage lakes. Since this lake is a seepage lake, it doesn't receive water from an inlet or an outlet, 90% of its water is from precipitation, less than 5% of the water is from the groundwater supply, and it doesn't receive a lot of runoff water because of the pine trees surrounding the lake, the permeable soil surrounding the lake, and the lack of large differences in elevation. Most of the water in the lake coming from precipitation can contribute to less biodiversity in terms of fish and means that most nutrients and minerals come from surface runoff, groundwater, and the atmosphere. Biodiversity is also less common in oligotrophic lakes like Crystal lake. Crystal lake is also dimictic, meaning that the water in the lake mixes twice a year and is stratified in between mixing periods.

== Ecology ==
In 1994, Leptodiaptomus minutus, a copepod species, commonly carried the peritrich ciliate Epistylis lacustris; 70% of copepods in 1994 carried at least one ciliate. This is a common phenomenon in many lakes and infested copepods often have lesions, making them easier prey which causes copepod populations to vary depending on ciliate infestation rates. The experiment by Xie, Sanderson, Frost, and Magnuson found that in Crystal lake, infestation rates positively correlated with copepod population density. This is contrary to another experiment performed on Shinhamako Lake which found a negative correlation between the two variables. The highest infestation rate in the study on Crystal Lake was 23.4% which is almost 7% less than the highest infestation rate in Shinhamako Lake at the time.

Airborne pine pollen is very common in the area around Crystal Lake and the fluctuation of pine pollen at Crystal Lake in 1981 was found to be 6.5gm^{−2}. The sediment in Crystal Lake has an immense number of diatoms and pollen which may be caused in part by atmospheric pollen around the lake. Evidence that pine pollen is extremely common in Crystal Lake can be found in the n-alkane deposits in the summer of 1981 because 66% of the n-alkane came from the pollen. Pine pollen is also a main source of organic carbon, phosphorus, 45% of the phosphorus is from pollen, and K^{+}, 20% of the positive potassium ion was from the pollen. Although pine pollen contributes these elements, concentrations of phosphorus and silicone are low in Crystal Lake which is likely due to the low amounts of surface runoff the lake receives.

In a study comparing three temperate lakes with three different trophic levels, Crystal Lake was the only lake with stable levels of automated ribosomal intergenic spacer analysis, ARISA, fragments in the years 2000 and 2001. ARISA is a technique that allows researchers to gain knowledge about the community of bacteria present in the lake at the time. The bacterial community did vary in the summer at the same time the lake was stratified.

An experiment performed on Crystal Lake and four other lakes in Vilas County examined how El Niño and La Niña and climate oscillation affect chlorophyll α concentrations on the surface of the water and algae dynamics between the five lakes. The chlorophyll α concentrations of the lakes changed in the same ways and amounts to different climate patterns and the results supported that climate oscillation and chlorophyll α concentrations are synchronized. This study found that the chlorophyll α concentrations in seepage lakes, like Crystal Lake, tend to depend more on climate than other types of lakes, since their main water source is precipitation. They also observed that algae growth is somewhat affected by climate, but there are of course other factors that contribute to it.

== Plant life ==
Despite being oligotrophic, there are nine different plant species in Crystal Lake. There are a few different microfossils in Crystal Lake, but a majority of them are land plants, with only one plant, a type of Isoete spore, that resides within the lake contributing to the microfossil collection. The plants in the lake show rosette growth patterns. In many oligotrophic lakes, nutrients from the atmosphere may affect the phytoplankton in the lake and their productivity. As mentioned in the Ecology section, there are also a lot of pine trees surrounding the lake.

== Geology and soil content ==
Sandy beach on the East side of Crystal Lake.

There are many small, soft water lakes in the area around Crystal Lake in Vilas County, Wisconsin and it is a possibility that these lakes used to be one big lake which was formed from a glacier. Seepage lakes such as Crystal Lake have more dissolved minerals than the bog lakes, but has less hard water than drainage lakes in the area. At 1.7 parts per million of calcium and magnesium in its water, Crystal Lake fits in with the other seepage lakes as far as dissolved mineral content. The bedrock underlying the lakes in Vilas County does not hold much water because it is all crystalline, aside from water that may reside in between crystals. Above the crystalline bedrock, there is drift made mainly of pink and gray granite, gabbro, pink rhyolite, gneiss, schist, and basalt with a little bit of quartzite, red sandstone, red slate, and red iron formation. Crystal lake is entirely surrounded by outwash plains with two deep wells adjacent to it. Directly beside Crystal Lake, there's yellow and gray sand along with small amounts of organic matter and this was found in the two wells drilled beside it to a depth of around 4 to 5 feet.

Lead has been greatly increasing in concentration from the year 1850 to 2000 and ^{210}Pb dating using pelagic sediments showed that Crystal Lake has a mass sedimentation rate of 80 g m^{−2} a^{−1} with a variability rate of 45% from year to year. This means that sediments from the pelagic zone in Crystal Lake were sampled, lead, or Pb, was taken from these samples and carbon dated to show its age which was used to determine how much sediment containing lead was deposited each year. 10,000 μg m^{−2} a^{−1} of Pb were recorded in atmospheric fluxes and PAHs had atmospheric fluxes of 34 μg m^{−2} a^{−1}. PAHs were also increasing from the year 1850 to 2000, but less than Pb while organic carbon and n-alkane concentrations have decreased and the amount of n-alkane from groundwater is considered negligible. The majority of ^{210}Pb in Crystal Lake is from the atmosphere and the majority of ^{210}Po, or polonium, in the lake is produced from the radioactive decay of the ^{210}Pb, or lead.
