= Samoset Council =

Boy Scout council in Wisconsin, US

- Council shoulder patch with Smiley the Tent mascot designed by Walt Disney
- Motto: Where Camping is King
- Owner: Boy Scouts of America
- Headquarters: Rhinelander, Wisconsin
- Country: United States
- Founded: 1920
- President: Tom Newell
- Council Commissioner: Tim Wooldridge
- Scout Executive: Pete Carteaux
- Website www.samoset.org

Samoset Council is a Boy Scout council headquartered in Rhinelander, Wisconsin that serves north central Wisconsin. Founded in 1920, the council gets its name from an early Boy Scout camp in the Town of Harrison named Camp Sam-O-Set. The council is served by Tom Kita Chara Lodge of the Order of the Arrow.

== History ==
What is now Samoset Council first began as the Wausau Council in 1920. In 1926 the Wausau Council merged with the Merrill Council, to create the Lincoln - Marathon Council. It was not until 1930 that it was officially retitled Samoset Council (named after Camp Sam-O-Set, an early camp near the town of Harrison) when it merged with the Marinette Council. Also, territory of nearby councils was absorbed when they ended. The history of each of the councils that are ancestors of Samoset is depicted in the chart below.

Stevens Point #633 founded 1921
Stevens Point #633 ended 1927

Wisconsin Rapids #636 founded 1917
Wood County #636 name changed 1925
Central Wisconsin #636 expanded 1929
Central Wisconsin #636 ended 1933

Marinette #626 founded 1920	Wausau #644 founded 1920	Merrill #627 founded 1921
Marathon & Lincoln; Counties #627 merged 1926
Marathon & Lincoln; Counties #627 expanded 1928
Samoset #627 merged 1930
Samoset #627 expanded 1937

Oneida County founded 1919
Rhinelander name changed 1922 ended 1924

Prior to the founding of the Wausau Council on July 30, 1920, there had already been several Boy Scout troops actively engaged in the Scouting program. The first troop to ever exist in the city of Wausau was Troop #1, chartered to the Universalist Church in 1910.

The first Council Executive for the Wausau Council was George C. Dreisbach, who moved to Wausau from Akron, Ohio in 1920. In 1921, Wausau was second in the state for number of Scouts, (25 Troops with 540 boys).

The council's first camp, Camp Lakota, was located on Carroll Lake, on public land leased from the state of Wisconsin.

== Program ==
Samoset Council has a long history of camping in Wisconsin's northwoods. The council's resident camps have long played a key role in providing youth members with an outdoor experience that is conducive to learning Scout skills.

Not only are there many traditional Boy Scout Troops, Cub Scout Packs, and Venturing Crews throughout the council, but the council also facilitates a ScoutReach program in some communities. ScoutReach is an opportunity for boys who have not already joined a traditional Pack or Troop to experience the Scouting Program. These units hold meetings twice a month as after school programs. These boys get to experience Scouting when they might not otherwise get the opportunity to be involved with Scouting at all. Since this is an after school program, there is usually no parent involvement, typically because of the parents' work schedules.

In 2009, Samoset Council was featured in the January/February issue of Scouting Magazine, which discussed the council's promotion of outdoor activity. The Scout Executive's Active Outdoor Challenge, an innovative Samoset program created by former Council Executive Bruce Audon Mikkelson, was described in detail. It involves getting Scouts outside and active for 12 monthly activities. When a pack, troop, or crew completes 12 consecutive monthly activities and a leader turns in a form, each youth receives a patch.

The council and its districts offer outdoor events and camping opportunities during each of the four seasons.

== Camps ==
Samoset Council camps (click on markers for Geohack maps)

=== Crystal Lake Scout Reservation ===
Crystal Lake Scout Reservation (CLSR), near Rhinelander, Wisconsin, consists of three summer camps: Akela's World, for Cub Scouts; Tesomas Scout Camp, a Boy Scout summer camp; and Hanna Venture Base for Venturers. The camping property that is now CLSR started as just Camp Tesomas, and began in 1935 with the donation of a 12 acres (0 km^{2}) parcel of land from L.A. Leadbetter. More property was later donated by the Rotary Club and other individuals and organizations. The CLSR property now encompasses over 1,100 acres (4 km^{2}) acres of land, and most of the property around Crystal Lake.

The Crystal Lake Construction Crew is a group of volunteers dedicated to building and improving the council's major properties.

==== Tesomas Scout Camp ====
Tesomas Scout Camp
- Location: Rhinelander, Wisconsin
- Founded: 1935
- Founders: William Hoffman, former Council Executive
- Ranger: Elvis Bauman
- Website www.campingisking.com

Tesomas Scout Camp is a Boy Scout Summer Camp, located north of Rhinelander, Wisconsin. Founded in 1935, it currently serves over 3,000 campers per summer. With over 1,100 acres (4 km^{2}) of land and 70 staff members, the camp occupies most of the land around Crystal Lake, a spring-fed lake with many species of freshwater fish.

The camp operates for eight weeks during the summer. The Scouts who camp at Tesomas typically stay one week with their Scout Troop. Many of the Boy Scout Troops that attend Tesomas are from cities located in the Samoset Council area of Wisconsin. However, troops from around the country also travel to Tesomas. Troops have traveled from as far as the West Coast. Activities at Tesomas include the merit badge program areas of Business and Technology, Ecology and Conservation, Personal Wellness, Handicraft, Shooting Sports, Scoutcraft, the Waterfront, Cope & Climbing, and the rank advancement area entitled Eagle Quest.

The main building is the Schultz-Kieffer Fellowship Lodge (also referred to as the Dining Hall, and formerly called the Rotary Lodge), where meals are served. The other main building is the Program Center, which houses the Camp Director's office, Program Director's office, Business Manager's office, Archives Room, Health Office, and leader mailboxes. The camp is the home of the Tom Kita Chara Lodge of the Order of the Arrow.

The Erv Romansky Family Camp, an area near Tesomas with 14 campsites, is for those who choose not to stay with their unit at summer camp. It can accommodate tents, pop-ups, and full size trailers or motor homes. Each site has a fire pit and water, and most have electricity.

The Tesomas logo is Smiley the Tent, a tent with a large smile, wearing a gold crown. Smiley is usually pictured with the camp's slogan, "Where Camping is King!" Smiley has the distinction of being the only Scouting symbol designed by Walt Disney. Tesomas was awarded Smiley after they let Disney take pictures of the surrounding forest as a base for Bambi's forest home.

Tesomas has earned awards from the Scouting National Accreditation Committee for being one of the top Boy Scout Camps in the nation.

Every year the annual SirenCon event is held at Tesomas, usually on the first Saturday of June. SirenCon was started in 2020 by Josh Schmirler, a Wisconsin siren enthusiast that wanted a place for siren enthusiasts to show off their sirens and sound them off. Tesomas makes a great place for SirenCon since the area is mostly secluded in a heavily wooded area. The attendance at SirenCon has grown rapidly since the event's inception in 2020. As of 2024, there is an entire team of staff members, ranging from planning committee members, to staff in charge of making sure each siren at SirenCon is sounded off successfully and safely. In 2024, SirenCon had a news story conducted on local NBC television station WJFW. SirenCon 2025 marked the first year that the event took place in May, with the event being held on May 31st. 2025's event had approximately 500 spectators in attendance and received more news attention than the year before. SirenCon 2026 saw an estimated 1000 spectators, although the exact number has yet to be verified.

==== Akela's World Cub Scout Camp ====
Created in 1993, Akela's World is a Cub Scout summer resident camp. Serving both Cub Scouts and Webelos Scouts during the summer, it occupies a large portion of the Crystal Lake Scout Reservation property, located at the south end of Crystal Lake. The camp program provides advancement opportunities for Cubs and Webelos.

The main building is the Mark Program Center, where the kitchen and dining hall are located. Points of interest are the Lost Ship, Crockett's Glen, Baloo's Cave, Fort Akela, and Huck Finn's Waterfront. However, as of 2017, Huck Finn's Waterfront is no longer in use due to the excessive rising of the lake's water level, submerging the Waterfront.

==== Hanna Venture Base ====
Hanna Venture Base, located near Akela's World, is the smallest part of the Crystal Lake Scout Reservation. It was named after, and financially supported by Al Hanna, whose achievements include climbing to the top of Mount Everest. The hub for Venturing in Samoset Council, it features an indoor climbing wall and an outdoor 60’ climbing tower, with walls for rappelling and climbing.

Week-long Hanna Venture Base Treks are taken by both Scouts and Venturers. Trek destinations include the Apostle Islands and the Porcupine Mountains.

The Hanna Winter Resort is a week-end-long winter camping experience at the Hanna Base.

=== Flambeau Canoe Base ===
The 150-acre (0.6 km^{2}) Flambeau Canoe Base is located on the south fork of the Flambeau River, near Lugerville, Wisconsin. The property includes several campsites, a covered shelter, and a tiered camp fire area. For spring through fall use, there are six canoes.

== Former camps ==
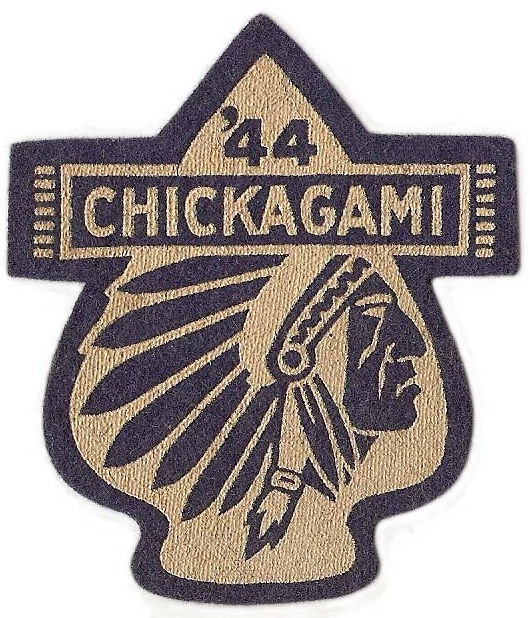
A 1944 patch from Camp Chickagami, made of felt. Similar in design to early Tesomas patches.

There is long and proud tradition of camping in Samoset Council, dating back to the very beginning of the council. In 1921, Camp Lakota (on Carroll Lake) was the council's first camp, but historical records are sketchy. With the later rise of Camp Sam-O-Set, quality camping has always been a key component of the council's program.

=== Camp Sam-O-Set ===
Located on Clara Lake near the town of Harrison, the council got its name from this camp (changing its name to Samoset Council in 1930). Camp Sam-O-Set was closed the year before the Tesomas property was opened in 1935. The camp, and subsequently the council, were named in honor of Chief Samoset.

=== Camp Chickagami ===
Camp Chickagami was a 40-acre (160,000 m^{2}) camp located near Stevens Point, and was closed in 1974. Since 1974 the camp property has been leased to the University of Wisconsin–Stevens Point and is used as Central Wisconsin Environmental Station. The facilities at CWES are open to scouting units between October 1 and April 30.

=== Camp Phillips ===
Camp Phillips was located in Weston, Wisconsin, adjacent to the Samoset Council Service Center. The 60-acre (0.2 km^{2}) camp was available for short-term camping, and was open to non-Scouting organizations. The main building was McCormick Lodge. A bouldering wall was constructed in 2009. The camp, along with the Council Service Center was sold in July of 2026 to a private developer. The developer has agreed to hold the camp open to scouting units through August 2026.

== Order of the Arrow ==
Tom Kita Chara Lodge
- Founded: 1936
- Membership: 500
- Lodge Chief: Ryan Blaskey
- Lodge Adviser: Matthew Jaworski
- Staff Adviser: Kristin Woller
- Website https://tkclodge.org

Tom Kita Chara (TKC) is a lodge of the Order of the Arrow, and is affiliated with the Samoset Council of the Boy Scouts of America.

=== Lodge history ===
After being chartered in December 1936, the first formal lodge meeting was held early in 1937 in Wausau, Wisconsin. That same summer Samoset Council's executive board approved the Order of the Arrow as an official part of the council's Boy Scout camping program. As tradition indicates, a deer leaped through the first lodge ceremony. The name of the lodge, Tom Kita Chara, means "leaping buck" in the language of the Chippewa Indians, who lived in north-central Wisconsin. The lodge number is 96, meaning that it was the 96th lodge of the Order of the Arrow to be formed. The lodge name may have been briefly changed to "Tesomas" in 1938, or that may have been its nickname, but the name "Tom Kita Chara" was official by 1939 or 1940.

In 1946, General Dwight D. Eisenhower was on vacation in Wisconsin. During his stay, members of the lodge visited and made him an honorary member. In turn, he later sent the lodge a letter and a sword, which are now located in the Archives Room at Tesomas Scout Camp, and are available for public viewing. The sword was part of his family for many generations as indicated by the original spelling of his family name — Eisenhauer.

In 1947, the first Winter Banquet was held, which is now an annual event. Also that same year, a TKC version of the Lenni Lenape legend was written, to be used in the calling-out ceremony. Later in 1947 the National Order of the Arrow Bulletin published it, and gave TKC full credit for its original development. The National Committee adopted it as its official version, and it is still used by TKC as well as many other lodges in the Order. The original script is located in the Archives Room at Tesomas Scout Camp.

The first TKC pocket flap patch was introduced in 1954. The design was similar to the current version, except it had a green background. This TKC "first flap" is now highly collectible, as are many other vintage TKC patches.

Since 1992, the Lodge Executive Committee of TKC Lodge has designed and issued a commemorative Scoutmaster belt buckle, which is given to the in-camp Scoutmaster of each troop that comes to Camp Tesomas. The belt buckle is strictly limited-edition and only available to the in-camp Scoutmaster, and one is given to the Tesomas Camp Director. At the end of each summer, these buckles are destroyed in an extremely large fire to preserve the tradition of only giving them to the Scoutmasters.

In 2006, TKC Lodge celebrated its 70th anniversary as a lodge. The previous year, when Tesomas Scout Camp celebrated its 70th camp anniversary in 2005, the lodge had the opportunity to welcome Robert Tank, its first lodge chief, back to the camp for a weekend of remembrance and celebration. All former chiefs of TKC Lodge present at the anniversary banquet signed a Vigil sash, now also on display in the Tesomas Archives Room.

2011 marked the 75th anniversary of TKC Lodge, which was widely celebrated and had a green commemorative lodge flap made based on the oldest known pocket flap from the lodge.

=== Chapters ===
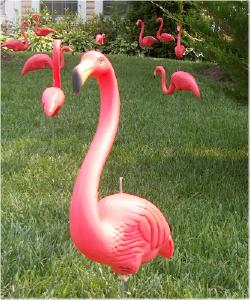
The Pink Flamingo is the symbol of the Ahdawagam Chapter, appearing on the chapter's pocket flap patch.

Every chapter has a Chapter Chief, who presides over the monthly chapter meetings. The position of Chapter Chief, along with other chapter offices, are filled yearly. The five lodge chapters include:

- Crystal Woods Chapter
- Rib Mountain Chapter
- Ojibwa Chapter
- Ahdawagam Chapter
- Mushkodany Chapter

Chapters frequently plan their own service projects and events such as campouts.

=== Lodge events ===
The Lodge's main annual events include:

- Winter Banquet, held in January
- Brotherhood Clinic/Lock-in in April
- Spring Work Trek, held in May
- Fall Conference, held in August
- Section Conclave, held in September

=== Lodge Executive Committee ===
The Lodge Executive Committee (LEC) is the leadership of the lodge. This includes the "Key Three" positions: Lodge Chief, Lodge Advisor, and Staff Advisor. The LEC also includes all lodge officers, including the five Chapter Chiefs.

Every Year the Lodge Chief, Vice Chief of Chapters, Vice Chief of Program and Vice Chief of Administration are elected at the Lodge's Fall Conference.

The LEC group meets once per month, and only youth members may vote on lodge matters.

== Organization ==
Samoset Council has a professional staff of approximately 12 people. There are 6,000 youth members in the council's 13-county geographic area. The Council number is 627.

=== Districts ===
The council is divided into five districts:

- Ahdawagam District serves Scouts in Adams, Arkdale, Babcock, Friendship, Grand Marsh, Nekoosa, Pittsville, Port Edwards, Rudolph, Vesper, and Wisconsin Rapids.
- Northwoods District serves Scouts in Antigo, Boulder Junction, Butternut, Crandon, Eagle River, Elcho, Gleason, Harshaw, Land O’Lakes, Laona, McNaughton, Medford, Merrill, Minocqua, Newbold, Phelps, Phillips, Prentice, Rib Lake, Rhinelander, St. Germain, Stetsonville, Three Lakes, Tomahawk, and Woodruff.
- Mushkodany District serves Scouts in Almond, Amherst, Amherst Junction, Bancroft, Birnamwood, Custer, Gresham, Junction City, Milladore, Mosinee, Plover, Rosholt, Stevens Point, and Wittenberg.
- Ojibwa District serves Scouts in Abbotsford, Athens, Auburndale, Blenker, Colby, Edgar, Hewitt, Marathon, Marshfield, Spencer, Stratford, Unity, and Withee.
- Rib Mountain District serves Scouts in Hatley, Hewitt/Texas, Kronenwetter, Maine, Rib Mountain, Ringle, Rothschild, Schofield, Stettin, and Wausau.

== See also ==
- Scouting in Wisconsin
