= Crystal Lake (Lakeland, Florida) =

- Location within Florida Location within the United States
- Location: Lakeland, Florida
- Coordinates: 28.0264°N 81.9098°W
- Type: natural freshwater lake
- Basin countries: United States
- Max. length: 1,735 feet (529 m)
- Max. width: 1,085 feet (331 m)
- Surface area: 27.58 acres (11 ha)
- Average depth: 6 feet (1.8 m)
- Max. depth: 17 feet (5.2 m)
- Water volume: 55,989,857 US gallons (211,944.66 m^{3})
- Surface elevation: 134 feet (41 m)

Crystal Lake is one of seven Crystal Lakes in Polk County, Florida, United States. It has a surface area of 27.58 acres (111,600 m^{2}). This lake is inside Lakeland, Florida, and most of the area surrounding it is completely urbanized. It is bounded on the east by county road 659 and on the north by Crystal Lake Park and North Crystal Lake Drive. On the west it is bordered by homes. On the southwest it is bordered by South Crystal Lake Drive and on the southeast it is bounded by more homes.

Crystal Lake has public access at Crystal Lake Park. This park has a fishing pier, a boat ramp and canoe access point, and some picnic tables. The park is open daily from dawn to dusk. There are no boat ramps or swimming areas along the lake shore, but it can be fished from the shore. The Take Me Fishing website says Lake Wire contains largemouth bass, bream and bluegill.
