= Chula Vista Isles =

Chula Vista
- Neighborhood
- Location within Florida Location within the United States
- Coordinates: 26°6′1″N 80°10′58″W
- Country: United States
- State: Florida
- County: Broward

Area
  - Total: 0.077 sq mi (0.2 km^{2})
  - Land: 0.077 sq mi (0.2 km^{2})
  - Water: 0 sq mi (0.0 km^{2})

Population (2000)
  - Total: 573
  - Density: 6,527/sq mi (2,519.9/km^{2})
- Time zone: UTC-5 (Eastern (EST))
  - Summer (DST): UTC-4 (EDT)
- FIPS code: 12-12262

Chula Vista Isles is a neighborhood of Fort Lauderdale, Florida, United States. It was previously a census-designated place (CDP) in Broward County, Florida, United States. The population was 573 at the 2000 census.

== Geography ==
Chula Vista is located at 26°6′1″N 80°10′58″W (26.100364, -80.182890).

According to the United States Census Bureau, the CDP has a total area of 0.2 km^{2} (0.077 sq mi), all land.

== Demographics ==
As of the census of 2000, there were 573 people, 204 households, and 140 families residing in the CDP. The population density was 2,458.2 people/km^{2} (6,367 people/mi^{2}). There were 215 housing units at an average density of 922.4 units/km^{2} (2,389 units/mi^{2}). The racial makeup of the CDP was 72.60% White (48.5% were Non-Hispanic White,) 12.39% African American, 0.17% Native American, 1.92% Asian, 0.52% Pacific Islander, 8.55% from other races, and 3.84% from two or more races. Hispanic or Latino of any race were 35.43% of the population.

There were 204 households, out of which 39.2% had children under the age of 18 living with them, 49.0% were married couples living together, 13.7% had a female householder with no husband present, and 30.9% were non-families. 22.5% of all households were made up of individuals, and 2.9% had someone living alone who was 65 years of age or older. The average household size was 2.81 and the average family size was 3.33.

In the CDP, the population was spread out, with 29.1% under the age of 18, 7.0% from 18 to 24, 36.3% from 25 to 44, 19.5% from 45 to 64, and 8.0% who were 65 years of age or older. The median age was 34 years. For every 100 females, there were 107.6 males. For every 100 females age 18 and over, there were 108.2 males.

The median income for a household in the CDP was $30,982, and the median income for a family was $26,250. Males had a median income of $30,331 versus $19,250 for females. The per capita income for the CDP was $13,809. About 20.7% of families and 21.5% of the population were below the poverty line, including 43.3% of those under age 18 and 4.4% of those age 65 or over.

As of 2000, English was the first language for 56.48% of residents, and Spanish was the mother tongue of 43.51% of the population.
