= Crystal Lake (Davenport, Florida) =

- Location within Florida Location within the United States
- Location: Polk County, Florida
- Coordinates: 28.1603°N 81.6415°W
- Type: natural freshwater lake
- Basin countries: United States
- Max. length: 1,245 feet (379 m)
- Max. width: 870 feet (270 m)
- Surface area: 14.38 acres (6 ha)
- Surface elevation: 125 feet (38 m)

Crystal Lake is one of a large number lakes of the same name in the world, including six others in Polk County, Florida. This lake is 2.4 miles (3.9 km) west of Davenport, Florida, and north of Haines City, Florida. It has a 14.38-acre (58,200 m^{2}) surface area and is shaped like a backwards comma. Crystal lake, a natural freshwater lake, is in a hilly area and is northwest of the intersection of Sanders Road and US Highway 27. It is in the vicinity of a large housing development and a fountain has been placed in it. On the east Crystal Lake is bordered by US 27. On the north it is bordered by a citrus grove and pastureland. From the northwest to the southwest the lake is bordered by houses and a pasture is on the southeast.

The edges of this lake are somewhat swampy and it has no swimming areas, public or private. It has no public or private boat ramps. The only public access to the lake is along the right of way along US 27. The Hook and Bullet website says Crystal Lake contains yellow perch, white perch and smallmouth bass.
