= Potawatomi Area Council =

Council of the Boy Scouts of America

- Owner: Boy Scouts of America
- Headquarters: Waukesha, Wisconsin
- Country: United States
- President: Leo Lesch
- Council Commissioner: Mark Rzeznik
- Scout Executive: Paul Schwartz
- Website http://www.pacbsa.org

Potawatomi Council locations (click on markers for Geohack maps)

The Potawatomi Area Council is headquartered in Waukesha, Wisconsin. The Potawatomi Area Council serves all of Waukesha County and portions of Dodge, Jefferson, Walworth and Washington Counties. The Wag-O-Shag Lodge is the Order of the Arrow lodge for the Potawatomi Area Council.

== History ==
The Oconomowoc Council was formed in 1917. It disbanded in 1921. The Potawatomi Area Council (#651) was formed in 1931.

== Organization ==
The Potawatomi Area Council has a professional staff of approximately 15 people. It comprises 21 Venturing Crews, 2 Sea Scout Ships, 101 Cub Scout Packs and 78 Boy Scout Troops in three districts. The council number is 651, which was assigned in 1931 when the council was chartered. Its headquarters and service center are in Waukesha.

== Districts ==
The Potawatomi Area Council is divided into four districts:

- Northern Trails District, Serving the communities of Brookfield, Elm Grove, Menomonee Falls and Germantown.
- Prairie Fox District, Serving the communities of Waukesha, Pewaukee, Sussex,
- South Wind District serving Mukwonago, New Berlin, Muskego, East Troy, Big Bend and North Prairie.
- Western Trails District, Serving the communities of Hartland, Delafield, Oconomowoc, Watertown, Sullivan, Dousman, Eagle, Palmyra and a portion of Johnson Creek.

== Camps ==
Camp Long Lake

Camp Long Lake is the 200 acre council camp for Potawatomi Area Council. Camp Long Lake is located in St. Cloud, Wisconsin. It is located on the north end of Long Lake, an approximately 7 miles (11 km), shallow lake caused by glaciation. It presently runs year-round with only a few weekends during the year with no events taking place.

=== History ===
Camp Long Lake was purchased in 1945 by the Potawatomi Area Council. During 1946, its first summer of operation, 308 boys camped over a period of six weeks. The camp season eventually expanded to eight weeks by 1965 and served 1701 boys in 1970 or 1971.

M. H. "Uncle Bud" Smith served as Camp Ranger from 1957–1979 and as Camp Director from 1972-1979. He was responsible for much of the program development that still affects camp today. Cary Kazcik served as Ranger from 1980–1987 and also as director from 1981-1986. Jim Greicar then became the Ranger in 1987 to 2002. He also served as Camp Director from 1995-1997. Mike "Shorty" Zindars was hired as Ranger in 2003, and retired in the spring of 2017. Jim Greicar returned as Ranger in June 2017 and retired in November 2021. Marty Kowalski took over as full time ranger in January 2022 and is the current ranger.

The camp season was shortened to five weeks in 1994, but was expanded back to six weeks in 2001. In 2005, the camp week was further expanded to seven weeks due to attendance of 1103 Scouts in the 2004 season.

Fred Pabst donated the original funds to construct the Dining Hall in 1950. The Dining Hall has since become a central area of camp which brings back many fond memories to Scouts and Scouters alike. Adult and Junior Leader Training courses have their patrol flags proudly hung from the rafters along with National Jamboree flags dating back to the 1950s. The Dining Hall underwent a major renovation completed in 1991.

Order of the Arrow Wag-O-Shag Lodge has been active in promoting and serving camp virtually since its beginning. The lodge donated funds for what is now the Nature Cabin in 1953. It later raised part of the funds for its 2003 renovation into the OA/Nature Cabin.

Camp Long Lake has grown and kept changing with the times. Traditional merit badge offerings were augmented with a Project First Class program in 1991 after changes in Boy Scout advancement requirements that challenged boys to complete their First Class rank in a year. A climbing tower was built to challenge Scouts 14 years of age and older in 1998. The Trail to Eagle program was added in 2002 to answer that call of many Star and Life Scouts needing assistance in obtaining the difficult required merit badges. Golfing merit badge was also added that year due to the increasing popularity of the sport. In 2004 a whitewater outpost was added for Scouts who are at least 13 years of age. In 2005, Photography merit badge was added to the program.

Starting in 2009, the council undertook to extensively update the camp's shooting range facilities with the construction of a BB gun and slingshot building and ranges which opened in 2010 and the construction of a large standing gun range for rifle and shotgun shooting activities for 2011.

== Wag-O-Shag Lodge ==
Wag-O-Shag Lodge is the Order of the Arrow lodge that serves the council. It was originally formed in October 21, 1944, with the name "Potawatomi Area Lodge", but the name was changed to "Wag-O-Shag" shortly after. This name is an anglicization of the Potawatomi word waugooshance, which means "little foxes".

In late 1943 and early 1944 Charles W. Woodson, Potawatomi Area Council Executive, conferred frequently with William G Hoffman, then Samoset Council Executive and Adviser to Area P of the Order of the Arrow, about starting a lodge in our council. Application for a lodge charter was submitted and approved by the National Council on October 21, 1944, with the number 280 being designated for the Potawatomi Area Lodge.

National Council expressed concern because of the similarity between the spelling of the Potawatome Lodge #63 of Bloomington, Illinois and the Potawattomi Lodge #122 of Chicago Heights, Illinois.

Dr. Vince Batha suggested the name “Wag-O-Shag” which was derived from the word “Waugooshance”. Waugooshance, in the tongue of the Potawatomi Indians, meant “little foxes”. At that time, early 1800s, many foxes inhabited the area and it was also the totem of the local Indian tribe. Waugooshance was also a favorite name with the Indians for crooked rivers, whose winding resembled the eccentric trail of the cunning animals whose name they bore.

Original charter members were: Charles W Woodson, Dr. James Christiansen, Dr. Vince Batha, Robert Jansky, Barton Rodgers, James Huber, Rudolph Timmel, Fritz Grover, Eugene Radke, and Ronald Johnson.

The first lodge officers were: Charles W Woodson, Adviser, who appointed the following: Ronald Johnson, Lodge Chief; James Huber, Scribe; Fred Grover, Treasurer.

The lodge participated with Mikano Lodge #231 at first until we became fully operational. The first lodge tapout took place at Indian Mound Reservation during summer camp periods. During the summer of 1945, 12 senior scouts and adults were tapped out by our ritual team. Ordeal was then completed while still in camp.

The following year the Long Lake property was opened for summer camp. At the first tapout all current Ku-Ni-Eh members were officially made Wag-O-Shag members. At that time all O.A. ceremonies were held at its secret campfire location off the camp property and was eventually completed with a concrete altar.

With the coming of the early 1930s and a lack of knowledge on the part of the council regarding Ku-Ni-Eh, Ku-Ni-Eh gradually took over as the honor camper society. Ku-Ni-Eh offered more secret rituals, local clans, dedication to the Scouting program, promote camping, and an embroidered patch worn on the right sleeve of the Scout uniform. It should be also noted that at this time Ku-Ni-Eh had a far greater membership than the OA. The National Council finally banned the Ku-Ni-Eh in 1948.

== See also ==
- Scouting in Wisconsin
