= Crystal Lake (south Winter Haven, Florida) =

- Location within Florida Location within the United States
- Location: south Winter Haven, Florida
- Coordinates: 27.9520°N 81.6823°W
- Type: natural freshwater lake
- Basin countries: United States
- Max. length: 1,355 feet (413 m)
- Max. width: 1,260 feet (380 m)
- Surface area: 35.93 acres (15 ha)
- Surface elevation: 128 feet (39 m)

Crystal Lake is a circular natural freshwater lake, with a small cove on its northwest corner, on the south side of Winter Haven, Florida. It has a 35.93-acre (145,400 m^{2}) surface area. This Crystal Lake is one of seven Crystal Lakes in Polk County, Florida. The Polk County Water Atlas says it is also sometimes called Lake Cunningham. Crystal Lake is bordered on the north and northwest by residences. The rest of the lake is bordered by citrus groves or vacant land.

There is no public access to this lake. However, persons have been using a dirt track on private property to reach the south side of the lake and launch small boats. The Hook and Bullet website says River Lake contains smallmouth bass, yellow perch and white perch.
