= Crystal Lake (Broward County, Florida) =

Lake in the state of Florida, United States

- Location within Florida
- Location: Broward County, Florida
- Coordinates: 26°02′59″N 80°11′35″W
- Basin countries: United States
- Surface elevation: 3 ft (0.91 m)

Crystal Lake is a lake in Broward County, Florida. In September 1999 the area was annexed by the City of Deerfield Beach.

== See also ==
- List of lakes in the United States
