= Crystal Lake, Polk County, Florida =

Crystal Lake, Florida
- Census-designated place
- Location in Polk County and the state of Florida
- Coordinates: 28°02′13″N 81°54′23″W
- Country: United States
- State: Florida
- Counties: Polk

Area
  - Total: 2.8 sq mi (7.3 km^{2})
  - Land: 2.7 sq mi (7 km^{2})
  - Water: 0.12 sq mi (0.3 km^{2})
- Elevation: 141 ft (43 m)

Population (2010)
  - Total: 5,514
  - Density: 1,895/sq mi (731.6/km^{2})
- Time zone: UTC-5 (Eastern (EST))
  - Summer (DST): UTC-4 (EDT)
- GNIS ID: 2402806

Crystal Lake is a census-designated place (CDP) in Polk County, Florida, United States. The population was 5,341 at the 2000 census, an increase from 5,300 in 1990. The 2010 Census reported a population of 5,514. It is part of the Lakeland–Winter Haven Metropolitan Statistical Area.

== Geography ==
According to the United States Census Bureau, the CDP has a total area of 7.3 km^{2} (2.8 sq mi), of which 7.0 km^{2} (2.7 sq mi) is land and 0.3 km^{2} (0.12 sq mi) (4.27%) is water. The town is located at 28.03525 N, 81.90847 W.

== Demographics ==
Historical population
| Census | Pop. | Note | %± |
|---|---|---|---|
| 1960 | 3,172 | | — |
| 1970 | 6,227 | | 96.3% |
| 1980 | 6,827 | | 9.6% |
| 1990 | 5,300 | | −22.4% |
| 2000 | 5,341 | | 0.8% |
| 2010 | 5,514 | | 3.2% |

As of the census of 2000, there were 5,341 people, 2,151 households, and 1,383 families residing in the CDP. The population density was 766.6/km^{2} (1,985/mi^{2}). There were 2,389 housing units at an average density of 342.9 units /km^{2} (888 units/mi^{2}). The racial makeup of the CDP was 80.94% White, 13.63% African American, 0.75% Native American, 0.88% Asian, 0.02% Pacific Islander, 2.45% from other races, and 1.33% from two or more races. Hispanic or Latino of any race were 7.21% of the population.

There were 2,151 households, out of which 30.0% had children under the age of 18 living with them, 42.5% were married couples living together, 16.2% had a female householder with no husband present, and 35.7% were non-families. 25.6% of all households were made up of individuals, and 8.6% had someone living alone who was 65 years of age or older. The average household size was 2.48 and the average family size was 2.96.

In the CDP, the population was spread out, with 25.5% under the age of 18, 12.1% from 18 to 24, 29.6% from 25 to 44, 19.3% from 45 to 64, and 13.5% who were 65 years of age or older. The median age was 34 years. For every 100 females, there were 97.4 males. For every 100 females age 18 and over, there were 96.7 males.

The median income for a household in the CDP was $30,699, and the median income for a family was $35,591. Males had a median income of $28,125 versus $22,110 for females. The per capita income for the CDP was $15,606. About 13.7% of families and 16.4% of the population were below the poverty line, including 19.2% of those under age 18 and 9.6% of those age 65 or over.
