= Crystal Lake, Washington County, Florida =

Coordinates: 30°26′39″N 85°41′19″W

Crystal Lake, Florida
- Unincorporated Community
- Interactive map of Crystal Lake, Florida
- Country: United States
- State: Florida
- County: Washington
- Incorporated (town): None
- Incorporated (city): None

Government
  - Commissioner: Unknown
- Time zone: UTC-6 (Central (CST))
  - Summer (DST): UTC-5 (CDT)
- ZIP code: 32428
- Area code: 850

The Crystal Lake is an unincorporated community and lake community in Washington County, Florida, United States. It is located just north above the county line. The main roads through the community are State Road 77.
