= Skink – No Surrender =

2014 novel by Carl Hiaasen

- The first edition cover
- Author: Carl Hiaasen
- Language: English
- Genre: adventure comedy
- Published: 2014 Alfred A. Knopf
- Publication place: United States
- Media type: Print (book)
- ISBN: 978-0-375-87051-4

Skink – No Surrender is a young adult novel by Carl Hiaasen, published on September 23, 2014. It is described as Hiaasen's fifth young adult novel. He has authored four previous novels for "young" readers. Like all of his novels, it is set in Hiaasen's native Florida.

== Plot ==
Richard is worried when his cousin and best friend, Malley, fails to meet him for their regular nightly exploration of Loggerhead Beach, scouting for turtle nests. Noticing a soda straw poking out of such a nest, Richard pulls it up and is surprised when a homeless man, "Skink", bursts out of the sand and complains about Richard ruining his trap. Skink explains that a poacher has been stealing eggs from the nests at night; Skink has been lying in wait to "have a chat" with him. Richard apologizes and runs off wondering where Malley was.

Richard becomes even more worried when Malley's parents tell him she has left Florida for early orientation at a boarding school they enrolled her in, yet when Richard calls the school, its secretary tells him there is no such event. When Malley calls Richard, she admits that she has run away from home with a friend she met in an online chatroom, and warns Richard not to tell the truth to her parents. Skink tells him, in no uncertain terms, to reveal the truth.

Malley's parents are alarmed, even more so when the police discover that the name of her friend, "Talbo Chock", actually belongs to a soldier killed in Afghanistan, meaning this new friend is an identity thief or worse. Richard is frantic, but after Skink has dealt with the poacher, he announces that his next "project" is to track Malley down and bring her home safe, and he invites Richard to come along. Since the police have had no success in tracing Malley's whereabouts, Richard agrees, tricking his parents into believing he is going camping with a friend.

Driving a nondescript Chevrolet Malibu provided by Skink's best friend, retired Highway Patrolman Jim Tile, Skink heads toward the Florida Panhandle. Malley's last phone call had featured what sounded like a drawbridge in the background, but police have had no luck with this clue. During her next phone call, Malley claims to have seen an Ivory-billed woodpecker, causing Richard to realize that she is telling him the specific region in Florida where she is. It is clear, underneath her upbeat tone, that she is being held against her will by "Talbo Chock".

While they are camping one night, Skink is badly injured when he dashes into the road to save a baby skunk from being hit by a truck; the skunk is saved, but Skink's injuries leave him unable to drive. Though Richard is underage, Skink coaches him to drive the car, and Tile, who has been shadowing them, provides a counterfeit license in Richard's name. Unfortunately, they are separated when Skink jumps into the river to wrestle an alligator that purloined their dinner fish.

Feeling he has no choice but to go alone, Richard creeps onto the houseboat and finds "Talbo Chock"'s abandoned car and tracks him and Malley to a houseboat moored in the Choctawhatchee River. However, he is then taken prisoner by her abductor, Tommy Chalmers a.k.a. Talbo Chock, brandishing a loaded revolver. To everyone's surprise, Skink appears on the boat and delivers a brief lecture on Tommy's "loathsome act[s]" – stealing the identity of a dead soldier, abducting Malley, and taking a potshot at an endangered heron that was bothering him. Skink seizes Tommy and throws his gun overboard while shoving Richard and Malley into the water.

Richard and Malley make their way to the river bank. Malley admits how stupid she was to run away with Tommy, but defends herself by describing tensions with her parents and denies that Tommy molested her. Hiking back to the car, the kids unearth a stash of money that Skink brought with him, which they use to purchase essentials and rent a small skiff. Malley calls her parents to tell them she's all right but makes up an excuse that will allow them an extra day to return home. Both of them resolve to go back for Skink.

The duo return to find the houseboat sunk and Skink standing on the roof, having been non-fatally shot by Tommy with a second gun before he got away. Richard advocates leaving the manhunt for the police, but Malley insists on seeing him captured herself. The trio find Tommy hiding in a tree, half-deranged from fever and exhaustion, but still clutching his second gun. He offers to let Skink and Richard go if Malley comes with him. She pretends to agree, then sucker-punches him. Skink disarms him, but he tries to flee in a canoe. Richard uses a fishing rod to snag Tommy's shirt and as Tommy grabs hold of his shirt, he falls into the water, where he is killed by an alligator.

Before Jim arrives with a rescue boat, Skink says his goodbyes and slips away. Jim receives a call from the Walton County Sheriff that Tommy's body has been recovered. "Tommy" turns out to be another stolen identity, and the kidnapper's real name, identified through fingerprints, is Terwin Crossley. Back home, Malley and her parents agree to work at resolving their issues. Richard does not hear from Skink again, but Jim sends him a news article about an anonymous benefactor who has endowed a scholarship at the local college in Chock's name. Richard now looks for straws poking out the sand when looking for turtles.

== References to Hiaasen's other works ==
- Skink, a.k.a. Clinton Tyree, is a recurring character in Hiaasen's novels, who first appeared in Double Whammy, and subsequently in Native Tongue, Stormy Weather, Sick Puppy, Skinny Dip, and Star Island.
- There are two references to the characters and events of Sick Puppy:
  - After Skink retaliates against a litterbug, he mentions a similar prank played by a friend (Twilly Spree) who emptied an entire garbage truck into a litterbug's BMW convertible;
  - Skink mentions that his glass eye originally came from a stuffed bear, and Skink acquired it during a "non-social visit" to the house of a "fool who fancied himself a big game hunter" (Palmer Stoat).

== References to actual history, science, and current events ==
- While passing time at a campsite, Skink gives Richard a copy of Rachel Carson's Silent Spring, while Skink reads Doug Peacock's Grizzly Years, claiming to have met Peacock while both were serving in the Vietnam War.
- Richard remembers watching a news story about the 2012 mass shooting in Aurora, Colorado, which prompted him to ask his father if evil really exists.
- When Richard and Malley are running for their lives from a feral boar, he reflects that much of the blame for their predicament can be put on Hernando de Soto, the Spanish conquistador who introduced pigs to North America in the 16th century.

== Reception ==
In a starred review, Booklist's Cindy Dobrez noted that "Skink and Richard make quite a dangerous and entertaining duo in a story that careens perfectly from one crazy situation to the next".

Kirkus Reviews wrote, "Hiaasen’s fierce love for the wilds of Florida, his fundamental commitment to decency and his penchant for the bizarre are all on full display in this, a read as agreeable as his hero is". Similarly, Publishers Weekly indicated that "there is much to enjoy" about Skink – No Surrender and noted that "Hiaasen’s concern for the environment and its most vulnerable denizens is again on full display".

Booklist and Publishers Weekly also reviewed the audio book narrated by Kirby Heyborne. Publishers Weekly highlighted how "Heyborne’s easy-on-the-ears narration offers readily distinguishable voices for the characters of Richard, Skink, and Malley" and noted that "Heyborne’s smooth vocal transitions from one speaker to the next, combined with Hiaasen’s irresistible plot and dialogue, is a pleasure to listen to". In a starred review, Booklist's Lolly Gepson also highlighted Heyborne's ability to portray the various characters and concluded that "Heyborne’s talented narration perfectly captures the zany, grisly humor required to reproduce a Hiaasen novel".

== Accolades ==
Booklist included Skink – No Surrender on their 2015 lists of the top ten "Books on Sustainability for Youth" and "Crime Fiction for Youth", as well as their Booklist Editors' Choice: Audio for Youth list. The American Library Association also included it on their list of Amazing Audiobooks for Young Adults. The following year, Booklist included the audio book on their "Top 10 Humorous Fiction on Audio" list.
