= Razor Girl =

2016 novel by Carl Hiaasen

- First edition cover
- Author: Carl Hiaasen
- Language: English
- Publisher: Alfred A. Knopf
- Publication date: 2016
- Publication place: United States
- Media type: Print (hardback & paperback)
- Preceded by: Bad Monkey
- Followed by: Squeeze Me

Razor Girl is a 2016 novel by Carl Hiaasen, the sequel to his 2013 title Bad Monkey.

== Plot summary ==
Merry Mansfield is a free-spirited con artist who assists mobsters in abducting defaulting fugitives by rear-ending their cars on the highway. Unfortunately, after completing one such abduction on the Overseas Highway, Merry discovers that she and her accomplice "Zeto" have snatched the wrong person: Lane Coolman, a Los Angeles talent manager on his way to Key West to supervise a live appearance by his firm's most important client, reality television star Buck Nance. Without Coolman present, Buck, who is unprepared to give an improvised performance, resorts to telling jokes overheard from his brothers which contain racist and homophobic slurs. In fear for his safety, Buck flees and hacks off his trademark beard in the kitchen of a closed restaurant. The beard fragments are reported to health inspector Andrew Yancy, a former police detective.

While waiting for their real target, Merry and Zeto let Coolman call his boss, Jon "Amp" Ampergrodt, who is indifferent to his safety but discreetly asks Monroe County Sheriff Sonny Summers to start a search for Buck. Because of the urgent need to find Buck quickly, Sonny's only detective, Burton, reluctantly asks Yancy for assistance. Meanwhile, Zeto announces his intent to kill Coolman, but Merry takes pity on their victim and allows Coolman to escape. She and Zeto abduct their real target, Martin Trebeaux, a beach nourishment hustler who delivered faulty sand to the beach behind a Mafia-controlled hotel in Boynton Beach.

After completing the job, Merry spends the evening in Key West, where she sees Coolman and whimsically decides to spend the evening with him. Coolman is soon called to the scene of a tourist's accidental death and is horrified to learn that the alleged assailant in the incident fits Buck's description. Merry meets Yancy and leaves to have dinner with him, much to Coolman's chagrin. Only a few days later, Merry invites herself to stay at Yancy's home on Big Pine Key, despite his feeble protests that he is already in a relationship. Buck, meanwhile, has been kidnapped by his "biggest fan," an unemployed burglar named Benny "Blister" Krill. Blister's impromptu "tributes" to impress Buck include getting garish tattoos, causing the tourist's death and re-kidnapping Coolman.

In a burst of inspiration, Blister demands that he be written onto Buck's show, Bayou Brethren, as his long-lost twin brother. Buck and Coolman try to humor him until they can escape but start to seriously consider the ploy after watching the next episode on Blister's TV, which has been filmed without Buck. They present their demands to Amp, who cannot afford to ignore Coolman's threat to make Buck and his "brother" the stars of a rival spin-off that will eclipse Bayou Brethren in popularity.

A tattoo artist leads Yancy and Merry to Blister's apartment, but Blister impulsively stabs Yancy in the abdomen with a knife, forcing Merry to rush him to the hospital. Over the next several days, Yancy tries doggedly to apprehend Blister, a job made more difficult by the fact that Buck and Coolman are shielding him, using him as a decoy to gain a more lucrative contract for Buck. After Blister refuses to accept a "deal" from anyone other than Amp in person, the agency head reluctantly flies to Florida.

Rosa's continued absence eventually makes Yancy give in to Merry's attempts to seduce him, after which she disappears, leaving a note at his house encouraging him to go after Rosa in Oslo. Yancy begins a trip to Oslo but returns to Florida after he realizes during a layover that he has not resolved his own feelings about the case. Merry goes back to Miami and continues her work for the mob but realizes that Yancy is likely to continue pursuing Blister and may need her help.

After tracking Buck, Coolman and Blister to their hideout, being captured and escaping, Yancy works out a deal with Coolman to take custody of Blister as soon as Amp signs a new contract doubling Buck's salary. When things go awry during the meeting with Amp, Blister abducts Yancy at gunpoint and forces him to drive the group to the airport. They are intercepted by Merry, who disables their car and distracts Blister with her signature move. Blister realizes the danger and recovers his stolen gun, but Buck, who has had enough of Blister's violent behavior, sneaks up behind him and breaks his neck.

Buck becomes a national hero for his actions in Florida, but he has had enough of celebrity—estranged from his family, harried by his captivity and badly shaken by the realization that his TV persona has become a role model for violent racists like Blister, he quits Bayou Brethren and moves back to Milwaukee to open a music store. Yancy is saddened, though not surprised, when Rosa breaks up with him, admitting that she prefers Norway's tranquility to Florida's turbulence. Yancy's emotional blow is greatly softened when he returns home and finds Merry waiting for him, having decided that Yancy is too much fun for her to give up (at least for the immediate future).

== Characters ==
=== Recurring characters ===
- Andrew Yancy: a former Monroe County sheriff's detective, since demoted to an inspector for the Monroe County Department of Hotels and Restaurants ("Roach Patrol", as Yancy describes it)
- Dr. Rosa Campesino: Yancy's girlfriend, a Miami-based coroner-turned-emergency room doctor
- Rogelio Burton: Yancy's former partner, another detective at the Monroe County Sheriff's Office
- Sonny Summers: the Monroe County sheriff
- Tommy Lombardo: Yancy's supervisor at the Monroe County Department of Hotels and Restaurants

=== New characters ===
- Merry Mansfield: the eponymous character of the novel, a female con artist whose specialty is "bump jobs"; her true background is never revealed
- Juan Zeto-Fernandez, a.k.a. "Zeto": Merry's accomplice in her "bump job" abduction scams
- Lane Coolman: a Los Angeles-based talent manager at Platinum Artists
- Buck Nance: Coolman's star client, the lead of Bayou Brethren, a reality television program based on a family-run rooster farm in Louisiana
- Jon David "Amp" Ampergrodt: Coolman's boss, the head of Platinum Artists, the talent agency that manages the cast of Bayou Brethren
- Martin Trebeaux: a beach nourishment "entrepreneur"
- Brock Richardson: a wealthy attorney from Miami
- Deb: Brock's fiancée
- Benjamin "Blister" Krill: an incompetent burglar and Buck Nance's self-proclaimed biggest fan
- Mona Krill: Blister's common law wife
- Buddy, Junior and Clee Roy Nance: Buck's brothers and fellow cast-mates on Bayou Brethren
- Dominick "Big Noogie" Aeola: the Mafia capo supervising Martin Trebeaux
- Juveline: Big Noogie's mistress who talks in her sleep; her name is taken from a misspelling of "juvenile" on an arrest form
- Irv Clipowski: proprietor of Clippy's restaurant and the partner of Key West's mayor
- Rachel Coolman: Lane Coolman's estranged wife
- Abdul-Halim Shamoon: a middle-aged Muslim businessman from New York, the innocent victim of Blister's hate crime in Key West

== Allusions to history, science, and current events ==
- Merry explains to Coolman that she conceived the idea for her signature "performance" act after reading a news story about a Florida woman who crashed her car under the same circumstances. This is a reference to Megan Barnes, who crashed her car on the Florida Overseas Highway on March 2, 2010, while taking her hands off the wheel to shave her bikini zone; like Merry, Barnes claimed she was on the way to meet her boyfriend in Key West (unlike Merry, Barnes was accompanied by a passenger, her ex-husband, whom she instructed to take the wheel while she shaved).
- Buck's television show, Bayou Brethren, was conceived as an attempt to capitalize on the popularity of Duck Dynasty, after the election of Barack Obama as President of the United States "brought a boom in TV reality shows featuring feisty rednecks." (Chapter 5) Similar to Buck, Duck Dynasty star Phil Robertson made several comments in a 2013 interview that were instantly criticized as homophobic, which caused his temporary suspension from appearing on the show.
  - Hiaasen also makes an oblique reference to the similar series Moonshiners, explaining that Bayou Brethren was originally intended to be based on that concept, but it had already been taken by a different network.
- Irv Clipowski informs Yancy that he and his partner are planning on getting married on June 23, which is the birth date of Supreme Court Justice Clarence Thomas; Thomas authored a brief dissent in the landmark case of Lawrence v. Texas, in which the majority found a Texas anti-sodomy law to be unconstitutional. Whether Irv and his partner intend this to be a tribute to Thomas (who characterized the law as "uncommonly silly" and said it should be repealed by the state legislature) or a snub (because Thomas sided with the minority and refused to vote to strike down the law as discriminatory) is unclear.

== Allusions to Hiaasen's other works ==
- Several of the characters, including Yancy, the protagonist, re-appear from Hiaasen's previous novel, Bad Monkey.
- Hiaasen's most famous recurring character, Clinton "Skink" Tyree, has appeared in all of Hiaasen's previous even-numbered novels, Double Whammy (#2), Native Tongue (#4), Stormy Weather (#6), Sick Puppy (#8), Skinny Dip (#10), and Star Island (#12). Razor Girl (#14) breaks the pattern, and neither Skink (nor his best friend, Jim Tile) appear in this book, instead appearing in the subsequent novel, Squeeze Me (#15).

== Critical reception ==
Janet Maslin favorably reviewed Razor Girl for the New York Times, stating that the novel "meets [Hiaasen's] usual sky-high standards for elegance, craziness, and mike-drop humor." She also commented that the novel's overriding theme was exceptionally poignant to the 2016 U.S. presidential election:

It illustrates the dog-whistle effects of bigotry that take the form of entertainment, with a plot that revolves around a "Duck Dynasty"-type reality show, the sermons delivered by one of its stars and a crazed fan who decides to follow what he thinks are the star’s teachings. Mr. Hiaasen - and probably only Mr. Hiaasen - could weave this into a book that’s still so funny.
...
[T]he one authentic thing about Buck is his prejudice. That’s why he needs to be kept on a short leash. But without Lane at his side, he tells a homophobic joke in Key West, then wonders if the audience didn’t laugh because he used the wrong slur.
...

It is in these diatribes that Buck has inveighed against Muslims, Jews, blacks, gays and anyone else who is not a white Christian. Mr. Hiaasen calls him "a septic inspiration to impressionable mouth-breathers" like Blister, who becomes a flagrant racist and deadly menace. It’s what he imagines his hero would have done. And even if Blister is the only crazed fan turned abductor with a shot at having his own role on a hit reality show, the book makes it clear that he is not alone in his delusions.

Michael Schaub, reviewing Razor Girl for NPR, likewise praised Hiaasen's deft interweaving of the seemingly chaotic plot elements, and his ability to find humor even when dealing with serious themes:

The plots of Hiaasen's novels are exceedingly difficult to describe. His stories are as intricate as they are fast-paced, and the sheer number of characters he includes in each book makes summarizing them next to impossible, unless you want to sound like a stoner describing The Big Lebowski to a friend who's never seen it. So let's just say that when all is said and done, the reader has been introduced to countless crooks and lowlifes, an elderly man who dies of a heart attack while trying to scrape an Obama bumper sticker off his neighbor's car, a thief with an ill-tempered pet mongoose, a drug that causes "random tissue deformities and life-threatening erections," and more Gambian pouched rats than you've probably ever read about. (Yes, they are real, and they are terrifying.)... In the hands of another author, Razor Girl could have turned out shambolic and confused. But Hiaasen is a gifted storyteller who knows that the key to keeping readers engaged is a mixture of suspense and humor.... Razor Girl is vintage Hiaasen, in the very best way: darkly funny, unapologetically crazy, and more Florida than a flamingo eating a Cuban sandwich while singing a Jimmy Buffett song.

Booklist reviewed Razor Girl as "the ultimate beach reach for anyone with a taste for Hiaasen's skewed view of a Florida slouching toward Armageddon."

Booklist also praised the audiobook version for its deft handling of the book's myriad plot-lines, and the performance of multiple character voices by the reader, John Rubinstein.
