= Lucky You =

Lucky You may refer to:

- Lucky You (novel), a 1997 novel by Carl Hiaasen
  - Lucky You (theatre adaptation), theatre adaptation of the novel
- Lucky You (film), a 2007 film starring Eric Bana and Drew Barrymore set in the world of professional poker
- "Lucky You" (Eminem song), 2018, featuring Joyner Lucas from Kamikaze
- "Lucky You", a song by Deftones from their eponymous 2003 album
- "Lucky You" (The Lightning Seeds song), 1994
- "Lucky You", a song by The National from Sad Songs for Dirty Lovers
- Lucky You, a cologne by Lucky Brand Jeans
