= Strip Tease (novel) =

Novel by Carl Hiaasen

- First edition
- Author: Carl Hiaasen
- Publisher: Alfred A. Knopf
- Publication date: Sep 1993
- Publication place: United States
- Media type: Print (hardback and paperback)
- Pages: 353
- ISBN: 0-679-41981-0
- Preceded by: Native Tongue
- Followed by: Stormy Weather

Strip Tease is a 1993 novel by Carl Hiaasen. Like most of his other novels, it is a crime novel set in Florida and features Hiaasen's characteristic black humor. The novel focuses on a single mother who has turned to exotic dancing to earn enough money to gain legal custody of her young daughter, and ends up matching wits with a lecherous United States Congressman and his powerful corporate backers.

Like many Hiaasen novels, the book's plot is set against a backdrop of a particular environmental crime or corruption issue that angers the author. In this case, it is the plutocracy of sugar growers in Florida, and the exorbitant subsidies regularly granted to them by the U.S. Congress.

Strip Tease was a New York Times bestseller in 1993.

== Plot ==
During a late-night bachelor party at the Eager Beaver, a strip club in Fort Lauderdale, Florida, drunken groom-to-be Paul Guber climbs on stage and grabs Erin Grant, one of the dancers. Before the club's bouncer can act, Paul is attacked with a champagne bottle by another customer. The attacker turns out to be Congressman David Lane Dilbeck, an incorrigible (yet secret) patron of adult establishments. Political fixer Malcolm Moldowsky, representing Dilbeck's legislative patrons in Florida's sugarcane industry, is furious at Dilbeck's stupidity since he is in the middle of a tough re-election campaign.

Erin, a single mother engaged in a custody fight with her ex-husband Darrell, was fired from her job as a secretary for the FBI after he was arrested for grand larceny. The legal costs of her divorce impelled a desperate Erin to take up exotic dancing as a career. Ironically, Erin's new occupation has given the judge a prejudiced view of her, while Darrell's criminal record has been expunged due to his work as an informant for the police. As a result, Darrell has been given custody of their daughter Angela, and Erin desperately needs even more money to reverse the court decision.

One of Erin's lovestruck fans, a bookish man named Jerry Killian, recognizes Dilbeck from the club and tries to blackmail him into influencing the judge in Erin's favor. But when the judge proves resistant to Dilbeck's probing, Moldowsky arranges for Jerry's murder so as to avoid attracting any more negative attention to his client. The body is found floating in a river in Montana by Miami homicide detective Al Garcia, on vacation with his family.

Another blackmailer surfaces in the person of Mordecai, a sleazy lawyer related to Paul's fiancée. One of Paul's friends from the bachelor party inadvertently snapped a picture of Dilbeck during the attack; Mordecai uses it to demand hush money. Instead, Mordecai and Paul's greedy fiancée are likewise murdered on Moldowsky's orders. However, Dilbeck's memory of Erin is indirectly sparked by the photo, and he obsessively refuses to continue with his campaign until he can "possess" her. Moldowsky, conscious that Dilbeck is necessary to his employers' continued prosperity, agrees to help.

Garcia returns to Florida and compares notes with Erin and her close friend, the club's bouncer Shad. He discovers evidence linking Jerry's murder to Moldowsky, but nothing that will stand up in court. At the same time, Darrell is again busted for larceny and his previous criminal history is revealed, tipping the custody dispute in Erin's favor. Deciding not to wait, she snatches Angela from her aunt's house while Darrell is away. Meanwhile, Moldowsky approaches Erin's boss and asks for her to give Dilbeck a private performance. Erin agrees, knowing that it is the best way of gathering evidence.

During her first private show, Dilbeck is rendered nearly helpless with lust, and Erin finds it easy to manipulate him. He offers her more money for a repeat performance, and she agrees. Realizing Dilbeck will probably escape implication in the murder under normal circumstances, Erin comes up with a plan to "destroy" him. On the night of the second show, Darrell follows Erin to the meeting place and comes upon Moldowsky watch-dogging the show, beating him to death in a drug-induced rage. Inside, Dilbeck tries to seduce Erin, and is vexed when she is unimpressed. Darrell enters and demands to be taken to his daughter. Erin moves to the next phase of her plan, drawing a pistol and ordering them both out.

With the help of Dilbeck's driver, Erin drives the two men to a sugarcane field owned by Dilbeck's supporters. When the car stops, Darrell flees for his life but then passes out; he is subsequently ground up along with the cane the next morning by a milling machine. Erin offers to slow-dance with Dilbeck in the cane field. Dilbeck believes the dance is a prelude to "wild cowboy sex," but when he realizes it is not, he tries to rape Erin–at which point he is seized by a squad of FBI agents, led by Erin's old boss, who received an anonymous call saying she had been abducted. Erin gives Dilbeck an ultimatum: in exchange for avoiding arrest and exposure, he has to resign his office.

With Darrell dead and the threat to her from Dilbeck and his patrons removed, Erin leaves the club and starts a new life with Angela. In the epilogue, it is revealed that she has got back her old job as well as a side-hustle dancing in the Main Street Parade at Walt Disney World and is currently applying to become an FBI agent herself.

== Critical reception ==
Times reviewer Donald E. Westlake described Hiaasen's style as "a cross between Dave Barry and Elmore Leonard." In a positive review of the novel, Westlake claims that this is Hiaasen's strongest novel to date, writing:

In among his freaks and obsessives ... the author has dropped a real honest-to-God human being, an appealing young woman named Erin Grant. Her presence ... makes the cartoon nastiness around her less cartoony and more nasty than in previous Hiaasen novels.

== Connections with Hiaasen's other works ==
- Al Garcia, who has appeared in Tourist Season, Double Whammy, and Skin Tight, makes his fourth, and (to date) last appearance in Hiaasen's novels.
- The book rails against the sugar cane industry for its exploitation of migrant labor (a theme briefly touched on in the previous novel Native Tongue) and pollution of the Everglades, both of which crimes are also carried out by "Red" Hammernut, the corporate villain of Hiaasen's later novel Skinny Dip.
- Malcolm Moldowsky is a political fixer, but his ostensible occupation remains unspecified. Palmer Stoat, the main antagonist of Hiaasen's novel Sick Puppy, plays a similar role to Moldowsky's, and is a lobbyist by profession.

== Allusions to history, geography, or people ==
- Dilbeck is based on J. Herbert Burke, a Republican Congressman from Broward County who was arrested for disorderly conduct in a topless bar in 1978.
- In his book, The Swamp, a history of the Everglades, Michael Grunwald opines that the fictional Rojo brothers, Dilbeck's main patrons in the sugar cane industry, are thinly veiled parodies of Jose and Alfonso Fanjul, the owners of a large sugar cane conglomerate in Florida. Like the fictional Rojos, the Fanjul brothers became notorious in Florida for their ostentatious displays of wealth, and so served as a living indictment of the "struggling family farmer" myth used to promote agricultural subsidies.
- The Eager Beaver's owner, Orly, often boasts of ties to organized crime figures, such as Angelo Bruno, "Little Nicky" Scarfo and "Fat Tony" Salerno. One of these boasts falls flat when Salerno's death (which occurred in 1992) is reported.
- Moldowsky's hero and mentor is John Newton Mitchell, Richard Nixon's Attorney General, convicted of multiple crimes in connection with the Watergate scandal.
- In berating Dilbeck for his stupid behavior, Moldowsky reviews the names of several past politicians soiled by sex scandals: Gary Hart, Chuck Robb, and Teddy Kennedy.
- Moldowsky also lists women whose names have been associated with such scandals, including Fanne Fox (associated with Wilbur Mills), Elizabeth Ray (associated with Wayne Hays), Donna Rice (Gary Hart) and Gennifer Flowers (former president Bill Clinton).
- In lecturing Dilbeck, Moldowsky crudely paraphrases George Santayana's famous aphorism, "Those who ignore history are doomed to repeat it."
- Several real-life members of the U.S. Congress and Senate are also mentioned by name as Dilbeck's contemporaries, including Bill Bradley, John Kerry and Daniel Patrick Moynihan.
- Garcia refers to the founding of the United States as a nation when he wonders aloud "what Thomas Paine would think of a Congressman who has sex with old shoes and laundry lint."
- In trying to impress Erin, Dilbeck shows her photos of him with several real-life politicians and celebrities, including Tip O'Neill, Colin Powell, Bill Bradley, Chris Dodd, Al D'Amato, Newt Gingrich and Chuck Norris.

== Film adaptation ==
In 1996, it was adapted to the screen, under the title Striptease, written and directed by Andrew Bergman, and starring Demi Moore as Erin, Burt Reynolds as Dilbeck, Ving Rhames as Shad, Armand Assante as Al Garcia, Robert Patrick as Darrell, Moore's daughter Rumer Willis as Angela and Paul Guilfoyle as Moldowsky. The film was critically panned and did poorly at the box office.
