= Double Whammy =

Double Whammy may refer to:

- Double Whammy (novel), a 1987 novel by Carl Hiaasen
- Double Whammy (film), a 2001 film starring Denis Leary and Elizabeth Hurley
- A strong magic spell, From double + whammy ("evil spell; curse or hex"), popularized by the American cartoonist Al Capp (1909–1979), in his classic comic strip Li'l Abner (1934–1977).
- "Double Whammy (ss3bby yaridubz)", a 2025 song by Xaviersobased
- "Double Whammy", an episode from Good Luck Charlie
