= Nicola Alexis =

British actress

Nicola Alexis is a British actress best known for playing the role of WPC Ruby Buxton in the long running ITV drama The Bill.

She played the lead role in the theatre adaptation of Carl Hiaasen's Lucky You, which premiered at the Edinburgh Festival Fringe in 2008.

She made a guest appearance in EastEnders in August 2015 as the midwife that delivered the stillbirth child of Shabnam Masood and Kush Kazemi (Rakhee Thakrar and Davood Ghadami)

Alexis portrayed Hermione Granger in the Harry Potter play Harry Potter and the Cursed Child.

== Filmography ==
=== Film ===
Year	Title	Role	Notes	Ref.
2017	Desecration	Adesua Daniels		
2020	Clearing	Yvonne	Short film	
2021	Asunder	Carol	Short film	
2023	Stopmotion	Nurse		
2024	5lbs of Pressure	Dr. Wright		
2025	Heads of State	News Anchor		
2025	Jingle Bell Heist	Diane		
2026	Return to Silent Hill	M		

=== Television ===
Year	Title	Role	Notes	Ref.
1999	Dangerfield	Lizzie Gregory	Episode: "Something Personal"	
2001	Baddiel's Syndrome	Wendy	Episode: "Nut Allergy"	
2002–2003	The Bill	PC Ruby Buxton	Series regular; 28 episodes	
2003	M.I.T.: Murder Investigation Team	PC Ruby Buxton	Episode: "Moving Targets"	
2003	Absolute Power	Naomi	Episode: "History Man"	
2003	Holby City	Rachel Thomas	Episode: "Full Circle"	
2004	Doctors	Barbara Sandhurst	Recurring role; 3 episodes	
2006, 2015, 2022	EastEnders	Comfort Shodipe	Recurring role; 3 episodes	
2007	Desperados	Miss Evans	Recurring role; 4 episodes	
2007	The Commander	Margie	Recurring role; 4 episodes	
2011	Doctors	Jill Mathison	Episode: "Bring Me the Ted of Albert Garcia"	
2014	Hollyoaks	PC Matthews	Recurring role; 7 episodes	
2015	Emmerdale	Dr. Jones	Guest role; 1 episode	
2015	Doctors	Jess Boorman	Episode: "Conclusions"	
2016	Obsession: Dark Desires	Hailey	Episode: "Burning Love"	
2019	Fleabag	Sylvia	Episode: "Series 2, Episode 3"	
2020	Enterprice	Auntie Bev	Episode: "The Mitchell Brothers"	
2021	The Girl Before	DCI Patricia Shapton	Miniseries; 1 episode	
2022	Casualty	Maggie	Episode: "Blame Game"	
2022–2024	DI Ray	Dr. Sylvia Clancy	Recurring role; 2 episodes	
2023	Death in Paradise	Odette Hays	Episode: "An Unpleasant Homecoming"	
2023	Vera	Leanne Waller	Episode: "Blue"	
2023	Queen Charlotte: A Bridgerton Story	Lady Smythe-Smith	Episode: "Gardens in Bloom"	
2024	Mr Bates vs The Post Office	Consultant Psychiatrist	Episode: "Episode 2"	
2024	Tell Me Everything	Corrine	Episode: "Series 2, Episode 6"	
2024	Dune: Prophecy	Yaofirks Truthsayer	Recurring role; 2 episodes	

== Theatre credits ==
Year	Title	Role	Venue	Notes	Ref.
2013	Unrivalled Landscape	Kizzy	Orange Tree Theatre, London		
2018	Harry Potter and the Cursed Child	Hermione Granger	Palace Theatre, London		
2018	A Small Place	Actress I	Gate Theatre, London		
