= Squeeze Me (novel) =

Novel by Carl Hiaasen

- First edition
- Author: Carl Hiaasen
- Language: English
- Genre: Crime novel, Satire
- Publisher: Knopf
- Publication date: August 25, 2020
- Publication place: United States
- ISBN: 9781524733452
- Preceded by: Razor Girl
- Followed by: Fever Beach

Squeeze Me is a novel by Carl Hiaasen. It was released on August 25, 2020. He dedicated the novel to his younger brother, Rob, who was killed during the Capital Gazette shooting on June 28, 2018. The book debuted at #2 on The New York Times Best Seller list.

The trade paperback edition of Squeeze Me was released on May 11, 2021, featuring a brand-new epilogue written in the aftermath of the 2020 United States presidential election. Hiaasen explained, "It seemed clear to me that the bizarre and menacing real-life events following the recent national election required some satirical attention – an updated coda for the characters in the book, as well as for the readers."

== About ==
The mysterious disappearance of a wealthy, elderly socialite from the grounds of a Palm Beach mansion during a charity gala sets off a manhunt by the local police, egged on by the victim's wealthy friends, all members of a social club devoted to supporting the current President of the United States, a thinly-disguised version of Donald Trump. When the caretaker finds the socialite's body, he unsuccessfully attempts to cover-up the freakish true circumstances of the woman's death. Meanwhile, a local wildlife trapper is called to trap and remove numerous invasive Burmese pythons being discovered all over Palm Beach. Working with a retired highway patrol officer and Clinton "Skink" Tyree (an eccentric former Florida governor that often appears in Hiaasen's novels), the snake menace is finally ended.

== Synopsis ==
=== Part One: Get a Grip ===
On January 23, elderly socialite Katherine "Kiki" Sparling Pew Fitzsimmons wanders onto the grounds of the exclusive Lipid Estate in Palm Beach during the annual "White Ibis Ball" to benefit victims of IBS. When Kiki fails to return, a search of the grounds finds only her purse, an empty martini glass and a half-bitten tablet of ecstasy littered next to the koi pond. Kiki's best friend, Fay Alex Riptoad, demands that Police Chief Jerry Crosby devote his department's entire resources to finding her. Crosby has little choice but to comply, knowing that Kiki, Fay and five other Palm Beach widows co-founded the "POTUS Pussies" (shortened to "Potussies" for media purposes); besides their considerable combined wealth, the women are all loyal supporters of the President of the United States and frequent guests at his nearby "Winter White House", Casa Bellicosa.

The following night, Tripp Teabull, the manager of the Lipid Estate, anxiously summons wildlife control expert Angela "Angie" Armstrong to deal with an eighteen-foot Burmese python on the grounds during the annual "Stars And SARS Ball." Since the python cannot be removed from the tree she is occupying without drawing attention unless it is dead, Teabull reluctantly permits Angie to decapitate her with a machete. After Angie does so, Teabull belatedly makes the connection between Kiki's disappearance and the bulge in the python's stomach. Terrified of the negative publicity if the truth comes out, he hires two amateur burglars to break into Angie's apartment, and then her rented storage freezer, stealing the python's carcass before Angie can turn it over to wildlife authorities for dissection.

To Teabull's horror, the clueless burglars drive the carcass back to the Lipid Estate to ask what should be done with it. He hurriedly tells them to bury it in the foundation of a nearby construction site. When the burglars open their trunk, they are unnerved to see the carcass has split, revealing Kiki's half-digested remains inside. Their nerve only lasts long enough for them to bury Kiki before speeding away from the scene, inadvertently jettisoning the python's headless body onto the highway along with a few loose pieces of Kiki's jewelry. The next morning, the carcass briefly delays the First Lady's motorcade on its way to Casa Bellicosa before it is removed by the Secret Service. Paul Ryskamp, the head of the Service's West Palm Beach office, calls Angie to remove the carcass and offer her opinion on whether other snakes might present a danger to the President or his wife.

Diego Beltrán, a Honduran refugee, arrives illegally in South Florida on the same night as the White Ibis Ball. Crossing a railway intersection on his way to work, he notices and picks up a conch pearl from the tracks, not knowing it came from Kiki's necklace. During a routine sweep by ICE, he is picked up and the jewel is found in his belongings. Under pressure from Fay, Crosby shares what little progress their investigation has made, including that Beltrán is being held "on suspicion." Fay, who like all the Potussies shares the President's xenophobia, ignores Crosby's warnings that the evidence against Beltrán is tenuous and immediately shares it with the Oval Office.

Kiki's family reluctantly posts a $100,000 reward for information leading to her whereabouts. Seeing the posting, one of the burglars, Uric Burns, strangles his partner and calls in an anonymous tip, which leads Palm Beach police to find Kiki's body at the construction site. Seeing the same posting, Angie quickly realizes what really happened to Kiki and approaches Crosby, who sets a trap for Burns at the bank where he is supposed to collect the reward money. Before Burns arrives, however, he is abducted and killed by Teabull, desperate to cover his tracks. Angie, Ryskamp and Crosby are horrified by what happens next: at an impromptu press conference from a Maryland golf course, the President denounces Beltrán as the head of a "horde" of immigrants "invading" the country and declares a "crusade" on social media with the slogan "NO MORE DIEGOS!"

=== Part Two: Muscle of Love ===
Crosby and Ryscamp interview Beltrán and find evidence corroborating his innocence. However, Crosby and Ryskamp agree that there is no way of getting Beltrán a fair trial, or of releasing him from jail, as long as the President is demonizing him on the Internet. Both reassure an outraged Angie that it won't be long before the President becomes distracted enough to abandon his "crusade," which instead drags on for months. Beltrán survives several murder attempts in jail, gradually losing hope as even his own defense lawyers are forced to withdraw after receiving multiple death threats. Although Teabull has eliminated all of the evidence against himself, he is still fired by his employers due to the bad publicity over Kiki's death and forced to take a caretaker job in Newfoundland.

Meanwhile, more giant Burmese pythons appear in Palm Beach, including one slipped into the bakery truck carrying the President's personal shipment of Key Lime Pies and another into a bikini shop recently visited by the First Lady. Angie is called to consult several more times, and she and Ryskamp eventually become lovers. She tells both him and Crosby that what they are seeing is not a random migration; someone is capturing or breeding pythons and releasing the largest ones in Palm Beach. Concerned that someone may be deliberately targeting the First Family, Ryskamp advises that they return to Washington, D.C., but they both refuse. Ryskamp privately confirms that the First Family are carrying on extramarital affairs in Florida: the President with a local stripper masquerading as his nutritionist; the First Lady with Keith Josephson a.k.a. Ahmet Youssef, the Secret Service agent heading her protection detail.

Angie was formerly employed by the state as a wildlife officer until she saw a poacher killing a fawn and fed his hand to an alligator, for which she served fourteen months at Gadsden Correctional Facility. She is surprised to be contacted by retired Florida Highway Patrol trooper Jim Tile, through whom she learns the name of the anonymous benefactor who paid for her defense lawyer: former state governor Clinton "Skink" Tyree, now living as a wild hermit and eco-terrorist in the Crocodile Lake National Wildlife Refuge. Tile says she needs to see for herself what Skink's latest "project" is. When she visits Skink's camp, she finds he is the python "unleasher." She warns Ryscamp and Crosby, but when she returns to Skink's camp the next day, both he and the pythons are gone.

Ryskamp hires Angie to patrol the grounds of Casa Bellicosa during the annual "Commander's Ball," a pro-POTUS fundraiser lovingly organized by the Potussies. Due to a malfunctioning tanning bed, the President suffers disfiguring burns to his face but refuses either to go to the hospital or skip the event, choosing to appear on stage covering his face with an African tribal mask. The Ball is disrupted when Skink's largest python appears on the grounds, interrupting a drunken tryst between Fay and the intoxicated brother of one of the other Potussies. The President, annoyed at the diversion of the crowd's attention, storms outside and is genuinely dumbstruck at the sight of the python, before the Secret Service hustles him back inside. Angie is forced to decapitate the python.

Having learned about the First Family's respective affairs through Ryskamp and a friend on Casa Bellicosa's service staff, Angie has a note slipped to the First Lady, summoning her to a private blackmail meeting on the grounds. Angered by news of the latest of Beltrán's suicide attempts, Angie lays out three simple demands: in exchange remaining silent about her affair with Youssef, the First Lady will persuade the President to have the Justice Department release Beltrán from jail, to have ICE approve his application for political asylum, and to have Homeland Security issue a public statement exonerating him of Kiki's death. Angie guesses (correctly) that Mockingbird cares enough about Youssef that she does not wish to see his life and career ruined by their affair being exposed. The First Lady threatens to divorce the President and expose his dirty secrets if he does not agree to Angie's demands.

=== Epilogue: Uncoiled ===
Now exonerated, and having survived his suicide attempt, Beltrán moves to Union City, New Jersey, where he has been offered a job with the U.S. Census Bureau. Crosby acts to swiftly to euthanize the pythons before anyone is killed, but the Palm Beach City Council is furious over the outbreak nonetheless; he resigns as Chief of Police before the council can vote to fire him. The President launches a new crusade, centered around a purported Chinese intelligence agent crossing the Mexican border after intentionally infecting himself with a virulent disease. The First Lady, enjoying a getaway at a private beach with Youssef, receives a letter from one of the President's lawyers, confirming that his mistress agreed to accept approximately $300,000 paid from Casa Bellicosa's catering budget, in exchange for scrapping her forthcoming book about their affair.

Ryscamp retires from the Secret Service. On her way to his home in Key West for a romantic weekend, Angie makes a detour to Skink's new camp in the Everglades. He confirms that all the pythons he was breeding were released, and subsequently killed, but reminds her that they are an invasive species. In frustration, Angie asks what the point of the whole "campaign" was supposed to be, since they both know that there is no Burmese python large enough to swallow a man of the President's girth. Skink says assassination was never his goal, he just wanted to show the President and the rest of the wealthy, secluded Palm Beach "set" something they had never considered. Angie angrily says that he is indirectly responsible for Kiki's death, but she is stunned when he reveals that the python that devoured Fitzsimmons was not one of his. That python's migration to Palm Beach and her appearance at the Lipid Estate was a completely random act of nature — in fact, it was what inspired Skink's "campaign" in the first place.

=== Epilogue (II): Exiled ===
N.B. This epilogue was added to the paperback edition, published on May 11, 2021.

After losing his re-election, Mastodon returns to Casa Bellicosa, where membership and the number of staff employed have both declined sharply. Likewise, event revenue at the club has declined after the ex-President's private helipad was demolished and noisy traffic from Palm Beach International Airport has been allowed to resume flying overhead. Youssef breaks off his affair with the First Lady and transfers off her security detail after she refuses to divorce her husband, explaining that their "companionship contract" which compensates her for appearing in public with the President does not expire for another three years and is too lucrative for her to consider terminating early. Alone in the club's pool, she glimpses her husband on a balcony in an open bathrobe and privately reflects that she isn't getting paid nearly enough.

The Potussies, chagrined at having contributed nearly half a million dollars to the President's various election lawsuits without the barest acknowledgment from him, and being blacklisted from events all over the island after the Capitol riots, are considering disbanding their group and applying for memberships at different country clubs, though they are reluctant to believe that the President's political career is permanently over.

Since the calamitous night of the Commander's Ball, Angie has been retained by at least twenty Palm Beach clubs, including Casa Bellicosa, to patrol their grounds weekly for more pythons. Catching sight of her on the grounds, the President has her brought to a secluded pavilion and unsuccessfully propositions her. Leaving the pavilion, Angie sees another python swimming in the ocean before going home to pack for another weekend with Ryskamp in Key West.

== Characters ==
Angela "Angie" Armstrong
Wildlife wrangler
Joel
Angie's Stepson
Pruitt
Angie's stalker, A vengeful semi-retired poacher
Jerry Crosby
Palm Beach Chief of Police
Paul Ryskamp
Secret Service agent, head of the West Palm Beach field office
Ahmet Youssef a.k.a. Keith Josephson
Secret Service agent, head of the First Lady's protection detail
Diego Beltrán
Political refugee from Honduras
Spaulding
Server at Casa Bellicosa
Christian
Mechanic servicing the Presidential tanning bed at Casa Bellicosa
"The Knob"
The tanning bed's "test dummy"
"Mockingbird"
First Lady of the United States
"Mastodon"
President of the United States
Clinton "Skink" Tyree
Former governor of Florida
Jim Tile
Retired Florida Highway Patrol, Tyree's best friend
Uric Burns
Burglar for hire
Keever Bracco, a.k.a. "Prince Paladin"
Uric's partner
The (surviving) POTUS Pussies
Fay Alex Riptoad
Dee Wyndham Wittlefield
Kelly Bean Drummond
Dorothea Mars Bristol
Deirdre Cobo Lancome
Yirma Skyy Frick

== Literary references ==
- Skink's counterfeit driver license bears a photograph of musician Jackson Browne and the name "George W. Hayduke, Jr.", a tribute to a primary character from Edward Abbey's The Monkey Wrench Gang;
- Before departing on the final phase of his "campaign", Skink leaves behind a copy of Franz Kafka's The Zürau Aphorisms, with a relevant passage underlined.

== Audiobook ==
The audiobook version of Squeeze Me was released concurrently with the hardcover novel in August, 2020, on compact disc and MP3, narrated by Scott Brick. The version won an Earphone Award from AudioFile magazine, the review for which stated, "Brick offers an array of unique voices for the interesting characters who navigate the ensuing intrigue and inept politicking. He excels at developing irresistible salt-of-the-earth personalities like Angie's while also lampooning the 45th president and his affluent Florida cronies." It was also a finalist for an Audie Award in the same year.

== Critical reception ==
Janet Maslin, who had released an overwhelmingly favorable review of Hiaasen's previous novel, Razor Girl, likewise praised Squeeze Me in her review for the New York Times: "If you are wearing a MAGA anything, you won't like this book... But if you could use some wild escapism right now, Hiaasen is your guy. In its themes and its wild imagination, Squeeze Me offers some familiar pleasures, akin to a Greatest Hits collection."

Richard Lipez echoed this praise in the Washington Post: "by the evidence of the scabrous and unrelentingly hilarious Squeeze Me, the Trump era is truly Carl Hiaasen's moment... One unnerving aspect of 'Squeeze Me' is that it's set in post-pandemic Palm Beach and Trump is still president. It will be useful for any pro-Biden readers to view this not as pessimism on Hiaasen's part but simply as some additional deeply mordant humor. Just dive in and have a wonderful time.... Hiaasen's narrative wanders around a bit randomly, but with all the lovingly biting detail there isn't a page here that flags."

Alex Shephard, reviewing Squeeze Me for The New Republic, compared the novel favorably with other, "embarrassing" satires of the Trump Administration, including Salman Rushdie's The Golden House, Howard Jacobson's Pussy and Dave Eggers's The Captain and the Glory:

Novelists, like the rest of us, can't look away from the Trump administration. Unfortunately, they haven't found much interesting to say about it.... Squeeze Me is, blessedly, an exception. While the best Trump fiction has dialed up the absurdity to speculative extremes, Hiaasen is clear-eyed: He meets the president on his subterranean level.

Trump is, in many ways, the perfect Hiaasen character: a rich, vain, racist, twice-divorced Palm Beach resident with a penchant for affairs with porn stars. Alec Baldwin's impression of Trump as a two-bit outer-borough thug has never sat right with me. Reading Squeeze Me, I finally understood why: Donald Trump is a Florida Man, through and through.

By setting Squeeze Me in Palm Beach, Hiaasen focuses squarely on the president's wealthiest supporters – the true heart of his base. There's a tendency to treat Trump mania as a distinctly low-class affair, but for Hiaasen it is an outgrowth of an out-of-touch gerontocracy. The wealthy of Palm Beach are money-grubbing and amoral.... These people support Trump because they have nothing but disdain for everyone beneath them – it is a way of acting out fantasies of punishing the poor and the non-white.

Squeeze Me is funny, but as with Hiaasen's best work, it is grounded in genuine outrage over the corruption that increasingly defines American political and cultural life.

== See also ==
- Donald Trump in popular culture
- Burmese pythons in Florida
