= Clinton Tyree =

- First appearance: Double Whammy (1987)
- Created by: Carl Hiaasen

In-universe information
- Nicknames: Skink, Captain
- Occupation: Captain – United States Army; English professor – University of Florida; Governor of Florida
- Family: Doyle Tyree (brother)

Clinton Tyree, a.k.a. Skink, is a fictional character who has appeared in several novels by Carl Hiaasen, beginning with Double Whammy in 1987. He is a former governor of Florida who suddenly abandoned his office to live in the wilderness, most often the Everglades and, later, the Florida Keys. Tyree is depicted as a skilled outdoorsman, a partaker of roadkill cuisine, and a fierce and slightly unhinged opponent of sprawl and overdevelopment in the state.

== Fictional biography ==
Tyree served as Governor of Florida in the 1970s. He was everything desirable in a candidate: a native of Florida, a college football star, and a decorated Vietnam veteran. He was dazzlingly handsome, charismatic, and articulate. He was also a former English professor at the University of Florida, though politically most people saw this as a handicap rather than an asset.

To the surprise of the Florida establishment, he was also one of the few honest men to hold the office, if not the only one. After he turned down a bribe from real estate developers, the developers assumed he was holding out for more money, and came back offering a larger bribe, along with a foolproof scheme for concealing the money. To their astonishment, the governor not only refused again, but had them arrested in an F.B.I. sting.

Tyree was also vehemently opposed to runaway growth in Florida, and gained national recognition for his passionate speeches and legislative proposals to discourage tourism, curtail land development, and protect the environment. For example, one of his proposed laws would have required any boat driver who killed a manatee to immediately forfeit his boat, pay a $10,000 fine or go to jail for forty-five days, and bury the dead animal himself at a public ceremony.

Appalled, a group of Florida special interests pooled their resources to neutralize the governor politically, bribing majorities in the state cabinet and the legislature (including lieutenant governor D.T. Maltby) to ignore or reject all of his initiatives. On the same day that the crooked developers who had tried to bribe Tyree were convicted, but punished with nothing more than probation, the Florida Cabinet voted unanimously (except for Tyree) to sell the original wildlife preserve that they'd been after to another developer for a pittance. This proved to be the straw that broke the camel's back; the next morning, Tyree walked out of the Governor's mansion and vanished. At first, Tyree was believed kidnapped, and a statewide manhunt was conducted. It was soon suspended when a resignation letter arrived in Tallahassee and Tyree's signature was authenticated by the FBI.

Years later, the executive assistant to the current governor reviews Tyree's history, and marvels at the futility of his struggle:

As popular as Clinton Tyree had been with the common folk of Florida, he stood no chance – none whatsoever – of disabling the machinery of greed and converting the legislature into a body of foresight and honest ethics. It was boggling to think a sane person would even try.

After leaving Tallahassee, he became a wild hermit, living first in Harney County (a fictional Florida county), where he adopted the name "Skink," and was simply viewed as an eccentric, albeit a potentially violent one. Since Double Whammy, Skink has moved south to Monroe County and mainly resides inside Crocodile Lake National Wildlife Refuge on Key Largo, Florida, rarely travelling beyond.

Over the years, he had made infrequent appearances all over South Florida, becoming something of an urban legend.

== Personal habits ==
In the first book in which he appears (Double Whammy), Skink lives in a tumbledown shack in fictional Harney County, and occasionally hires his services as a bass fishing guide. He survives mostly on roadkill cuisine, but sometimes fresh fish. In the later books, he has become more of a nomad, camping rough in the wilds throughout Southeast Florida, often close to the Everglades.

Wherever he goes, he travels with an immense library of first-edition books, stored at various times in his shack, in antique steamer trunks, or in old junker cars parked near his camps.

He listens exclusively to music from the 1960s and '70s: The Who, The Beatles, The Allman Brothers Band, The Rolling Stones, Buffalo Springfield, Creedence Clearwater Revival, Eagles, The Moody Blues, etc. In Stormy Weather, he sings "Box of Rain" by Grateful Dead to a small child scared after a recent hurricane.

Although he is seventy-two years old (as of No Surrender), he has exceptionally white and perfectly aligned teeth, is exceptionally tall, strong, and fit, and is an experienced hunter, woodsman, and fighter. He often has access to guns of various kinds.

Although he has adopted the name "Skink," he usually insists on being addressed as "Captain." In Star Island, he explains that this was his rank in the United States Army during the Vietnam war.

He occasionally ingests naturally derived hallucinogens, such as smoking homemade bufotenin joints. By the time of Squeeze Me, he confesses he ingests microdoses of LSD every other day.

== Appearance ==
Skink is (according to Double Whammy) six foot six inches tall, and proportionately broad. His skin is tanned dark brown from years spent outdoors. His eyes were originally green, but he lost one in a beating from a trio of teenage thugs. He replaced the lost eye with a glass eye taken from a stuffed barn owl, giving the appearance of heterochromia. The fake eye is crimson, and much larger than his normal one. Skink's hair is silver (though by the time of Sick Puppy he has gone bald on the top of his head), and he wears it long, along with an equally long beard, which he sometimes braids and accentuates with buzzards' beaks or other trinkets.

Tyree's clothes are a peculiar mix of the practical and the bizarre. At various times he wears a bright orange rain poncho (to keep from being hit on the highway while scooping up roadkills), a bright flowered shower cap, dungarees, military boots, a Rolling Stones t-shirt, and at one time a kilt made from a checkered racing flag.

His teeth are startlingly perfect, straight and white, and his smile is a trademark he retains from his election days (which often contrasts jarringly with the rest of his appearance).

Despite his age, lifestyle, and wild appearance, many of the female characters who run across him are strongly attracted to him.

== Family and friends ==
Skink's best friend is Jim Tile, an African-American Florida Highway Patrol trooper whom Tyree met in the 1970s while on the campaign trail, and appointed to be the head of his gubernatorial bodyguard. Tile was Tyree's driver when Tyree fled Tallahassee and was dropped off at a Greyhound station in Orlando. Since that day, Tile has been the only person aware of Tyree's approximate whereabouts. In books where Skink appears, Tile usually appears too. He makes it a personal priority to stay around his old boss and vouch for his character on the rare occasions when Tyree needs a helping hand.

It is revealed in Sick Puppy that Clinton had an older brother, Doyle. The two brothers went to Vietnam together. Doyle was discharged after a drunken joyride in a jeep led to a crash that killed his sergeant and inflicted serious head injuries on Doyle. The injuries, combined with guilt over the crash, led Doyle to suffer a nervous breakdown. After returning to the U.S., he left home and disappeared, becoming a homeless wanderer. When Clinton became governor, he tracked his brother down and gave him a job and home as the keeper of the (fictional) Peregrine Bay Lighthouse near Hobe Sound. In No Surrender, Tile confides that Clinton "came into some money" a few years before the events of the novel, implying that Doyle had died and left his unspent state earnings to his younger brother.

Also in Sick Puppy, Skink strikes up a friendship with the protagonist, Twilly Spree, a passionate young environmentalist with similar ideals. It is suggested that the two remain in touch after the events of the novel; in Skink's brief appearance in Skinny Dip he contacts and is met by an "intense young man" who is implied to be Spree.

== Books with Clinton Tyree ==
- Double Whammy (1987)
- Native Tongue (1991)
- Stormy Weather (1995)
- Sick Puppy (2000)
- Skinny Dip (2004)
- Star Island (2010)
- Skink – No Surrender (2014)
- Squeeze Me (2020)

Skink had appeared in all of Hiaasen's even-numbered novels for adults, beginning with Double Whammy (number 2) and ending with Star Island (number 12). This streak was broken by Hiaasen's 14th novel, Razor Girl, in which Skink does not appear. Skink's next appearance following Star Island was in Skink – No Surrender, a novel for young readers, and he subsequently appeared in Squeeze Me, Hiaasen's fifteenth novel for adults.

Skink is also referenced in the Jimmy Buffett song "The Ballad of Skip Wiley," describing him as an associate of that character (from Hiaasen's first novel, Tourist Season). In fact, Skink does not appear in Tourist Season, and Wiley does not appear in any novel besides Tourist Season, so there is no evidence that the two know each other, despite their similar political views.
