= Stormy Weather (novel) =

1995 novel by Carl Hiaasen

- First edition
- Author: Carl Hiaasen
- Language: English
- Publisher: Alfred A. Knopf
- Publication date: Aug 1995
- Publication place: United States
- Media type: Print (Hardback & Paperback)
- Pages: 335
- ISBN: 1-873567-24-3
- Preceded by: Strip Tease
- Followed by: Lucky You

Stormy Weather is a 1995 novel by Carl Hiaasen. It takes place in the chaotic aftermath of Hurricane Andrew in South Florida and concerns the tragic (though sometimes comic) effects of the disaster, including insurance scams, street fights, hunting for food and shelter, corrupt bureaucracy, a ravaged environment and disaster tourists.

== Plot ==
During their honeymoon at Walt Disney World, Max and Bonnie Lamb are taken aback by news of a hurricane making landfall in South Florida. To Bonnie's surprise, Max is possessed by a fervent desire to visit the disaster scene after it has passed through. Once they arrive, Bonnie is appalled to see Max hopping through demolished houses with his video camera, treating the devastation as a tourist attraction. She stalks away from him to regain her temper and is not present when Max is snatched up by "Skink," a hermit who attempts to teach him some manners and respect for nature.

Meanwhile, con artist Edie Marsh and her sometime partner, an ex-con nicknamed "Snapper," travel to the disaster zone to work a personal injury scam. However, the house they pick belongs to mobile home salesman Tony Torres. Tony quickly sees through the scammers and takes them hostage. Instead of killing them, however, he invites them in on his own scam: he's expecting a large insurance settlement but needs his estranged wife Neria's signature to collect. If Edie poses as his fake wife, Tony can cut out his real wife, and Edie gets a slice of the take. Meanwhile, after searching fruitlessly for Max, Bonnie is befriended by Augustine Herrera, a young man searching for exotic animals loosed from his deceased uncle's wildlife farm by the hurricane.

Edie and Snapper's scam falls apart when Tony is murdered by Ira Jackson, a mob enforcer whose mother was killed in one of Tony's sub-standard trailer homes during the hurricane. After parting ways, each of them discovers a new angle to work: Edie seduces Fred Dove, the insurance adjuster sent to Tony's home, and convinces him to help her pose as Neria for the insurance payoff. Snapper partners with Avila, a corrupt building inspector, to run a phony roofing company and con desperate homeowners. Snapper scores a $7,000 cash "deposit" from the wife of construction mogul Gar Whitmark. Later, during a traffic stop, he ambushes and beats Trooper Brenda Rourke, the girlfriend of Skink's friend Jim Tile, and steals her .357 revolver. Growing bored with the roofing scam, Snapper blackmails Edie and Fred into letting him in on their insurance scam by posing as the now-deceased Tony.

Ira next targets Avila, but is killed and eaten at the last second by an escaped African lion. Gar traces the roofing scam back to Avila and threatens to expose him unless he pays back the money Snapper stole, plus the cost of replacing Gar's roof. Meanwhile, Skink hands Max over to Bonnie, who by this time has become attracted to Augustine while falling out of love with Max. When Augustine volunteers to help Skink in his new mission of tracking down Snapper, Bonnie impulsively decides to stay in Florida and go along. Max flies back to New York City without her.

Skink, Augustine and Bonnie track Snapper's car to Tony's house, where they meet another of Tony's disgruntled customers, Levon Stichler. Snapper, thinking Levon is an insurance agent, identifies himself as Tony, only to be attacked with a metal spike in return. The two quickly realize that both have made a mistake. Fearful that the scam will be exposed, Snapper quickly concocts a plan to drive Levon south and dump him at a hotel in the Florida Keys. As he and Edie are loading Levon into a stolen Jeep Cherokee, Skink intervenes, only to be taken hostage along with Bonnie. Augustine misses the abduction but quickly deduces what happened. By hitting the redial button on the house phone, he learns of their destination in the Keys and notifies Jim.

Jim shadows the Jeep but loses the tail when he gets cut off by an opening drawbridge. The sudden involvement of three more unwanted people into the scam puts Snapper on edge. He and Edie argue, causing Snapper to fire through the roof of the Jeep. He forces them to stop at a liquor store, making the situation even worse. However, the stop delays Snapper long enough for Augustine to reach the Keys ahead of him. Upon reaching the hotel, Snapper hires a pair of prostitutes to keep Levon "entertained." Unknown to Snapper, the two women had blabbed their part in the plan to Avila earlier in the day, and he also comes to the hotel confronting Snapper over the roofing scam. Snapper chases Avila away, forcing him to jump into the ocean. Augustine uses this opportunity to conceal himself inside the Jeep with a rifle. When Snapper and the rest of the hostages attempt to leave, Jim arrives and is immediately shot by Snapper. Because he has a bulletproof vest, Jim survives.

Convinced he has killed Jim, Snapper transfers everyone into a carjacked Cadillac. Following them in the dumped Jeep, Augustine manages to steer alongside and shoot Snapper through the window with a tranquilizer dart, rendering him unconscious. Knowing that Jim's shooting will bring the police out in full force, the party abandons the vehicles and retreats into the Crocodile Lake National Wildlife Refuge. Around a campfire that night, Skink enacts revenge on Snapper before knocking him out with another tranquilizer dart. Edie, Bonnie and Augustine are led back to civilization by Skink while Snapper is left to fend for himself in the wild.

Max and Bonnie's marriage is annulled; a chance meeting between Edie and Max leads to her accompanying him back to New York, where they become engaged. Bonnie and Augustine move to a house in Chokoloskee, on the edge of the Ten Thousand Islands, where Bonnie becomes an avid outdoor photographer. Avila is picked up by a Coast Guard cutter, passes himself off as a Cuban refugee and is repatriated to Florida, where he resumes his career as a corrupt building inspector under a false name; a few months later, he dies after being bitten by a rabid rabbit during a botched santeria rite. Gar declares bankruptcy and revives his construction companies under different names; after he is killed in a freak accident at one of his construction sites. Brenda Rourke recovers from her injuries, and eventually marries Jim, who gives her a replica of her mother's wedding band for Christmas. Snapper's skeleton is discovered in the Crocodile Lake Refuge, except for his skull, which joins Augustine's collection.

== Characters ==
- Bonnie Lamb
- Max Lamb

=== Minor characters ===
(many of these characters are one-off characters, appearing only in brief vignettes, illustrating Hiaasen's overriding theme of the chaos unleashed by the Hurricane)

- Keith Higstrom: a young man and ardent hunting enthusiast, whose love for guns greatly outweighs his proficiency with them (his father abruptly terminated the family hunting tradition after a teenaged Keith accidentally shot off his ear with a rifle). After the hurricane unleashes livestock from nearby farms into the Miami suburbs, Keith decides to "hunt" in his own neighborhood. Seeing a Cape Buffalo escaped from Augustine's uncle's farm, he excitedly tries to shoot it, but misses, and is impaled to death when the animal charges at him.
- Christophe Michel: a French engineer for a home construction company, with somewhat shaky credentials; in designing and building upscale suburban homes, he has, with his superiors' full encouragement, foregone structural soundness for cost-cutting. When the subdivision he designed is annihilated by the hurricane, he quickly withdraws his life savings from the bank and prepares to flee the country, only to have them stolen by Snapper.

== Allusions to real-life persons, places, or events ==
- Edie refers to the William Kennedy Smith Trial when devising her plan to blackmail the family by seducing one of them.
- Ira Jackson's mother Beatrice's dachshunds are named Donald and Marla, named after Donald Trump and his then-wife Marla Maples.
- Snapper's real name is "Lester Maddox Parsons." His parents, both white supremacists, named him after Georgia governor Lester Maddox, a famed segregationist, at his mother's insistence; his father favored James Earl Ray, the assassin of Martin Luther King Jr. After his parents' ignominious expulsion from the Ku Klux Klan, Snapper's mother became a volunteer for the several political campaigns of segregationist J.B. Stoner.
- Several references are made to past hurricanes passing through the Southern U.S., including Camille and Donna. Augustine claims his parents conceived him during Donna.
- Hiaasen makes a mocking reference to a passing visit to the scene of the disaster by the President of the United States. Though the novel was published in 1995, during the Bill Clinton Presidency, Hurricane Andrew occurred in 1992; this date, coupled with Hiaasen's description of the unnamed President as a Republican, accompanied by his son, is a clear reference to George H. Bush, accompanied either by George W. Bush or his younger son, Jeb (Jeb served as governor of Florida from 1999 to 2007).
- During Skink's "pop quiz" on Max's knowledge of Florida history, he asks which of two Native American peoples - Seminoles and Tequestas - were in Florida first (the Tequestas), and the identities of former governor Napoleon Bonaparte Broward and environmental activist Marjory Stoneman Douglas (whom Max confuses with Marjorie Kinnan Rawlings, the author of The Yearling).
  - According to Jim Tile, during Skink's brief, tumultuous tenure as governor, he was caught in the act of trying to rob Broward's grave and distribute his bones as souvenirs in Tallahassee.

== Connections with Hiaasen's other works ==
- Skink, f.k.a. Clinton Tyree, and Jim Tile previously appeared in Hiaasen's novels Double Whammy and Native Tongue; Tile makes reference to Skink's loss of his eye in Double Whammy and his highway sniping of rental cars and his arson of an amusement park in Native Tongue.
- When Skink takes Max to an abandoned stilt house in Biscayne Bay, he mentions that its former occupant was a retired investigator for the State Attorney's office; this is an oblique reference to Mick Stranahan, the protagonist of Hiaasen's novel Skin Tight.
- The aftermath of Hurricane Andrew was fertile ground for several news stories exposing real-life corruption and incompetence in the construction industry and local and state governments; Hiaasen wrote several scathing columns in the Miami Herald. In particular, he derided the industry's and government's apologists for describing Hurricane Andrew as "the storm of the century," or "The Big One"—in other words, excusing their own shoddy construction or incompetence by exaggerating the force of the hurricane.
- In the subsequent novel Nature Girl, one of the characters mentions a Bonnie living in Chokoloskee that has "a solar powered sewing machine". This may refer to Bonnie Lamb, who, according to the epilogue in Stormy Weather, has since moved to Chokoloskee with Augustine.

== Other media ==
=== Audiobook ===
An audiobook version of Stormy Weather was released in 1997 by Recorded Books. The audiobook, read by George Wilson, is unabridged and runs 14 hours 8 minutes over 12 CDs.

== See also ==
- Hurricane Andrew
- Tropical cyclones in popular culture
