= Roadkill cuisine =

Preparation and consumption of roadkill

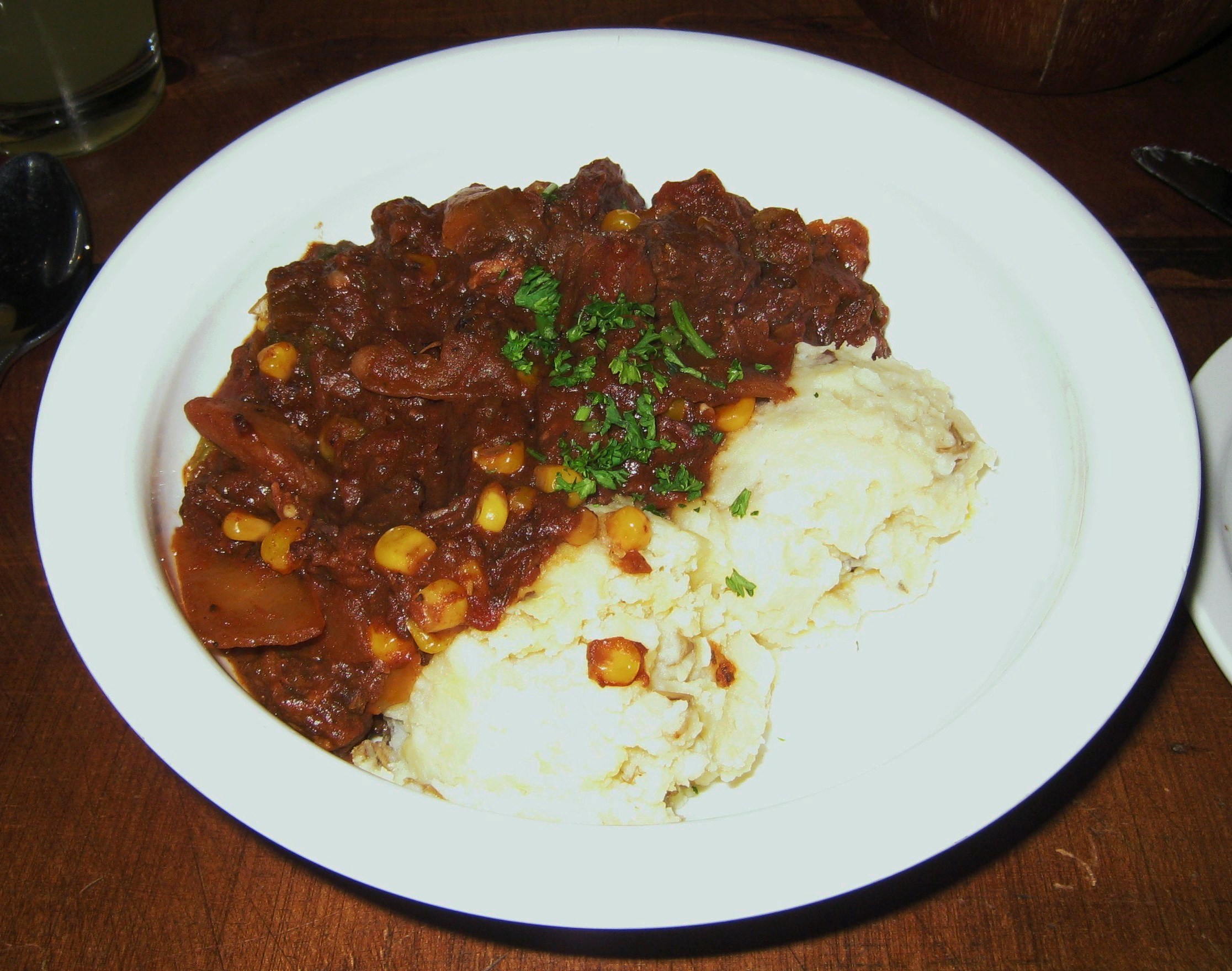
The Kentucky dish burgoo is sometimes made with roadkill meat

Roadkill cuisine is preparing and eating roadkill, animals hit by vehicles and found along roads.

It is a practice engaged in by a small subculture in the United States, southern Canada, the United Kingdom, and other Western countries as well as in other parts of the world. It is also a subject of humor and urban legend.

Large animals such as cattle, pigs, deer, elk, moose, and bear are frequently struck in some parts of the United States, as well as smaller animals such as birds and poultry, squirrels, opossum, raccoons, and skunks. Fresh kill is preferred and parasites are a concern, so the kill is typically well cooked. Advantages of the roadkill diet, apart from its free cost, are that the animals that roadkill scavengers eat are naturally high in vitamins and proteins with lean meat and little saturated fat, and generally free of additives and drugs.

Almost 1.3 million deer are hit by vehicles each year in the US. If the animal is not obviously suffering from disease, the meat is no different from that obtained by hunting. The practice of eating roadkill is legal, and even encouraged in some jurisdictions, while it is tightly controlled or restricted in other areas. Roadkill eating is often mocked in pop culture, where it is associated with stereotypes of rednecks and uncouth persons.

== Preparation ==
In the United Kingdom, various casseroles may be prepared from badger, hedgehog, otter, rat, rabbit or pheasant where available. Others recommend preparing fox cub or hedgehog in a fricassee. Hedgehog was traditionally eaten roasted with a nettle pudding. Badger must be cooked thoroughly to avoid the risk of trichinellosis (alt. trichinosis, trichiniasis). Roadkill enthusiasts in Canada recommend roasting beaver, which should first be soaked in salted water overnight after removing all fat. There are several roadkill cookbooks, typically with a tongue-in-cheek treatment but containing sensible advice, not least of which is ensuring that the flat meat is fresh and free of disease, and is adequately cooked to destroy bacteria and other contaminants.

Rat should be avoided because of the risk of Weil's disease.

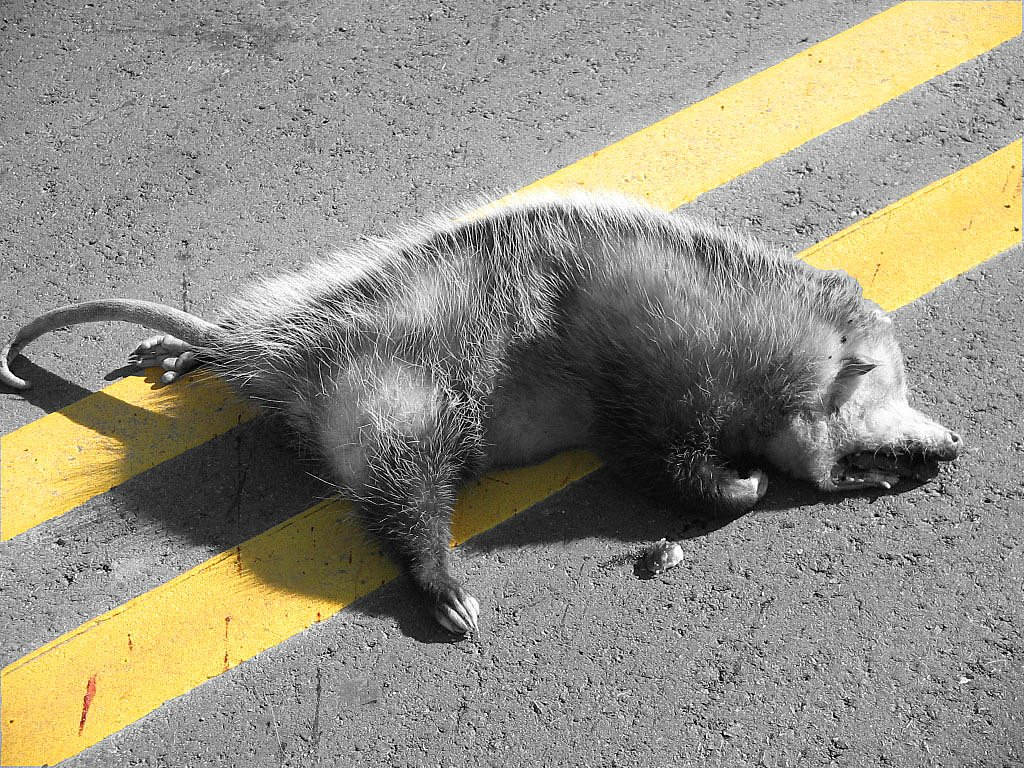
Opossum in Kansas City, Missouri

Buck Peterson has written a number of recipe books for this food source including Original Road Kill Cookbook, The International Road Kill Cookbook and The Totaled Roadkill Cookbook. Roadkill Cooking for Campers by Charles Irion gives advice on outdoor cooking of roadkill. The more discerning may prefer Jeff Eberbaugh's Gourmet Style Road Kill Cooking, which gives advice on converting roadside opossum, deer, turtle or skunk carcasses into dishes including squirrel pot pie, groundhog hoagies, creamed coon casserole and road kill stir fry.

Thomas K. Squier, a former Special Forces survival school instructor, argues that wild meat is free of the steroids and additives found in commercial meat, and is an economical source of protein. His book The wild and free cookbook includes a section devoted to locating, evaluating, preparing and cooking roadkill.

Not all sources are serious. According to some, raccoon or opossum are preferable to squirrel, and the taste is improved by aging and marinating the meat in roadside oil and grease before preparing a stew. Alternative recipes for roadkill include raccoon kebabs, moose-and-squirrel meat balls, Pennsylvania possum pot pie and skunk skillet stew. Some of these website recipes are strictly humorous in intent and warn readers that consumption may pose health hazards, possibly severe, if taken seriously.

There are various intergrades between an animal which has been squashed flat, and an animal which has been hit glancingly and thrown onto the verge. An example of the latter would be a cock pheasant which flew up and tried to challenge a passing car and was thrown on the verge with its skull crushed but no other damage.

As a guide to edibility, the mnemonic "How fresh is it? How flat is it?" serves to remind the would-be eater of the two main characteristics to check before preparing roadkill.

== By country ==
=== Commonwealth countries ===
==== Australia ====
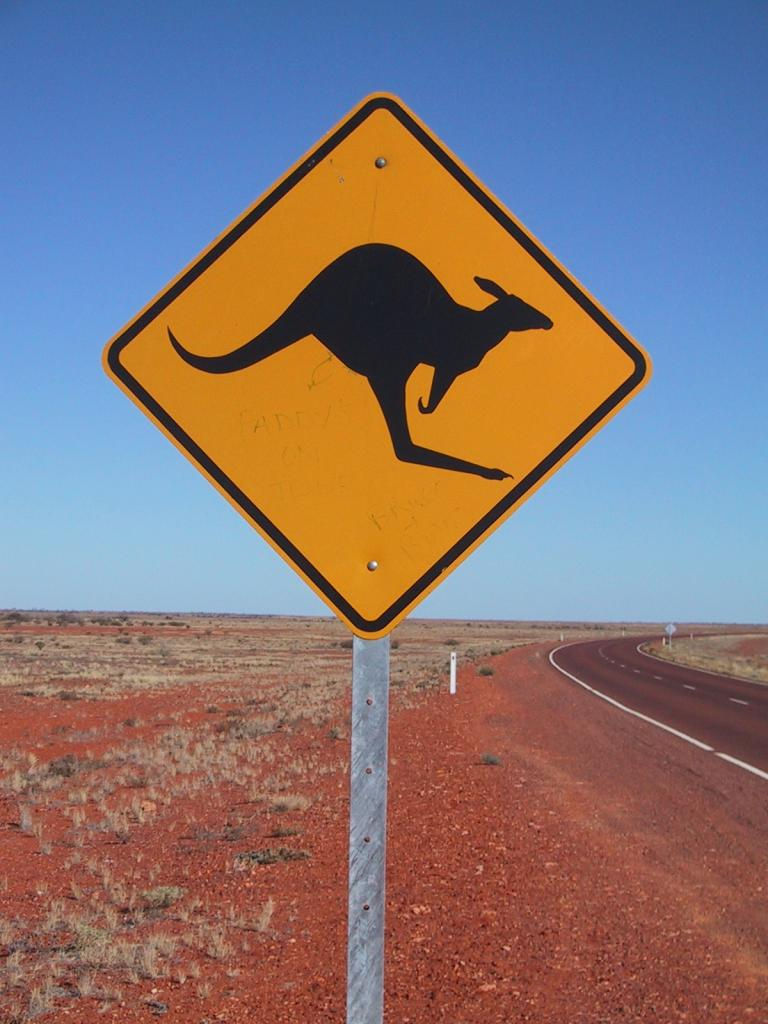
A "kangaroo crossing" sign on an Australian highway

In Australia, kangaroo meat is produced from free ranging wild animals, typically living on privately owned land. Wild kangaroos are a serious hazard at night in the Australian bush, accounting for 71% of animal-related insurance claims, followed by dogs (9%) and wombats (5%). Most vehicles in the bush are fitted with roo bars to minimize the risk of damage. The meat thus collected may be barbecued or prepared in a roo stew. Consumption of native species is only lawful if you possess a valid game hunting or scientific license.

==== Canada ====
Motorists in western Canada are at some risk of colliding with bears. Bear collisions have also been reported in Ontario. Bears killed by accident may be donated to needy people for their meat. There is some risk of trichinellosis if bear meat contaminated with Trichinella nativa is under-cooked. In 2008, protesters blocking a new highway in British Columbia set up a kitchen in their camp where they cooked raccoon stew, venison steaks, and bunny burgers using roadkill collected from the TransCanada Highway. Moose were introduced to Newfoundland in 1878, and are now abundant - and a road hazard at night. Until recently, moose that were cleanly killed in road accidents were given to charitable groups. However, in April 2009 the Department of Natural Resources stated that they were going to stop this practice, citing concerns about the provenance. A spokesman stated the department would no longer be: "providing roadkill under which we have no idea about the health of the animal, we have no idea about how the animal was butchered".

==== United Kingdom ====
The Independent and ABC News reported on food pioneer Fergus Drennan, "a full-time forager, environmentalist and star of the Fresh One Productions series The Roadkill Chef" broadcast in 2007 by the BBC. Drennan is a critic of factory farming. He does have limits to what he'll eat, "One of the few things that I tend to avoid are cats and dogs. In theory, I'd have no problem with eating them ... [but they've] always got name tags on their collars, and since I have two cats, it's a step too far."

Arthur Boyt is a retired biologist who "has spent the past 50 years scraping weasels, hedgehogs, squirrels and even otters off roads near his Cornish home, and cooking them." Boyt has published recipe books and appeared on television cookery shows and said that roadkill "is good for the body, the environment and the pocket. It's delicious and won't cost much at all. All you need is some veg and herbs." Boyt calls himself a "freegan" and, though a dog lover, does not believe in waste and is especially fond of the taste of Labrador Retrievers which he compares to lamb.

There have been reports of roadkill poaching in Sherwood Forest, home of the legendary Robin Hood. Apparently the poachers place food such as jam sandwiches on the road to attract deer. When one is killed by a vehicle, they quickly retrieve the carcass for use in game pies and venison steak.

=== United States ===
Rules about taking and eating roadkill vary in the United States. The trend has been for increased legal acceptance.

In addition to some in rural areas, cooking and eating roadkill has also been reported among the hobo population.

==== Alaska ====
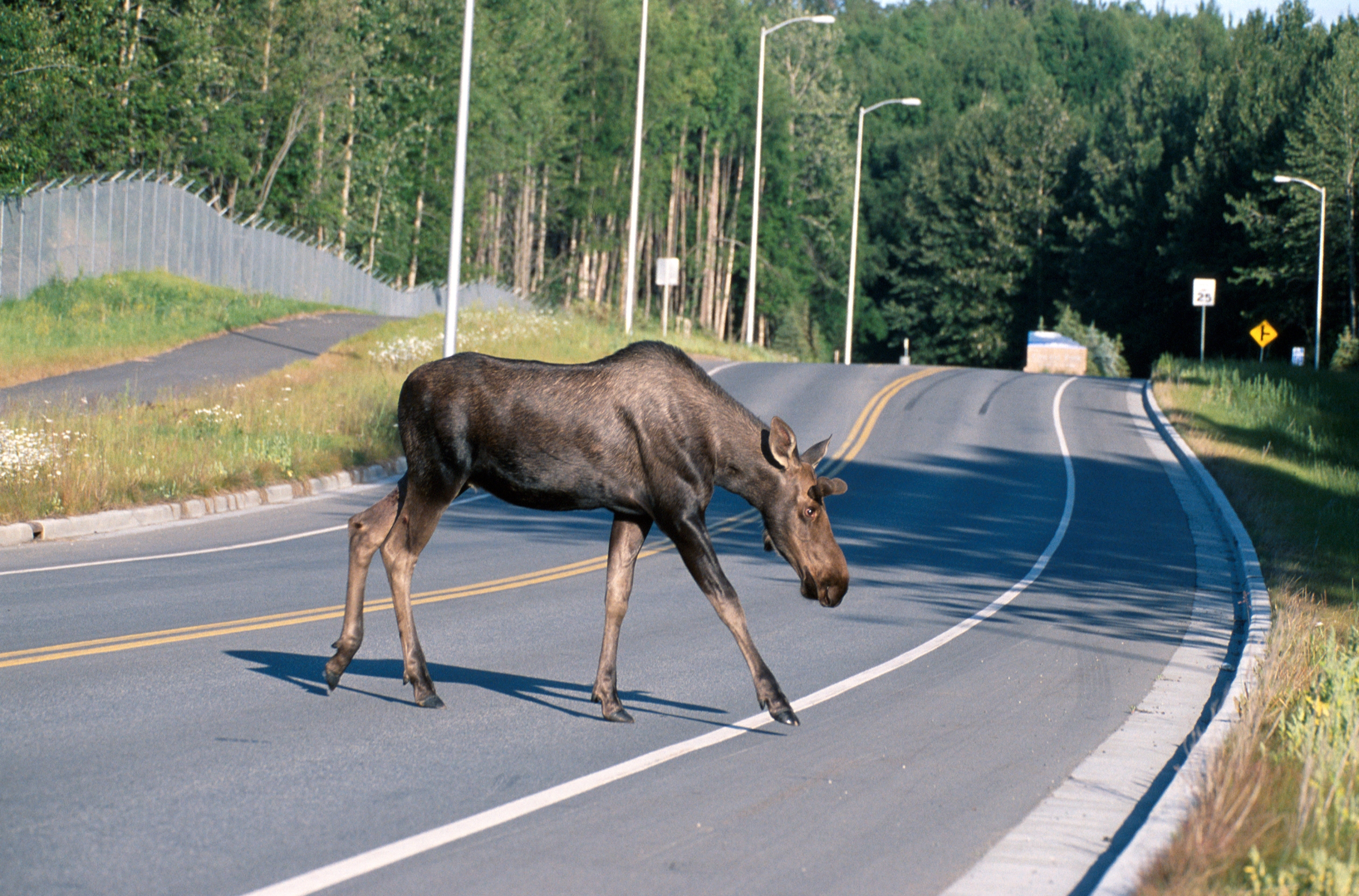
Moose crossing a road, Alaska, United States

In Alaska, big game roadkill (notably moose and caribou) are considered state property; the operator of the vehicle that killed the animal must call a state trooper or the division of fish and wildlife protection to report the kill. The troopers will turn the carcass over to charity "if it's not too smooshed". When they receive news of a moose roadkill, volunteers rush to the scene to butcher the animal, which must be quickly bled, gutted and quartered so the meat can cool as fast as possible. The meat is taken to churches, which distribute it to needy families, and soup kitchens make stew. Around 820 moose are distributed in this way each year. Local residents may also register to be included on the "roadkill list" in the more rural areas, ensuring that the valuable meat is not wasted.

==== Arizona ====
§ 17-319. Big game killed by motor vehicle; salvage permit; violation; classification

A. Notwithstanding any other provision of this title, the carcass of a big game animal that has been killed as a result of an accidental collision with a motor vehicle on a maintained road may be possessed and transported by the driver of the vehicle if the driver first obtains a big game salvage permit issued by a peace officer. A person may possess or transport the carcass or any part of the carcass of a big game animal killed as a result of an accidental collision with a motor vehicle only as provided by this section.

==== Arkansas ====
There is no express law prohibiting the taking of animals killed by vehicle in Arkansas. However, for species that are protected by state hunting laws and otherwise would require a tag to harvest, the proper procedure is to first call the Arkansas Game and Fish Commission (the poaching hotline is answered 24/7) and report the animal, providing your personal information.

==== Georgia ====
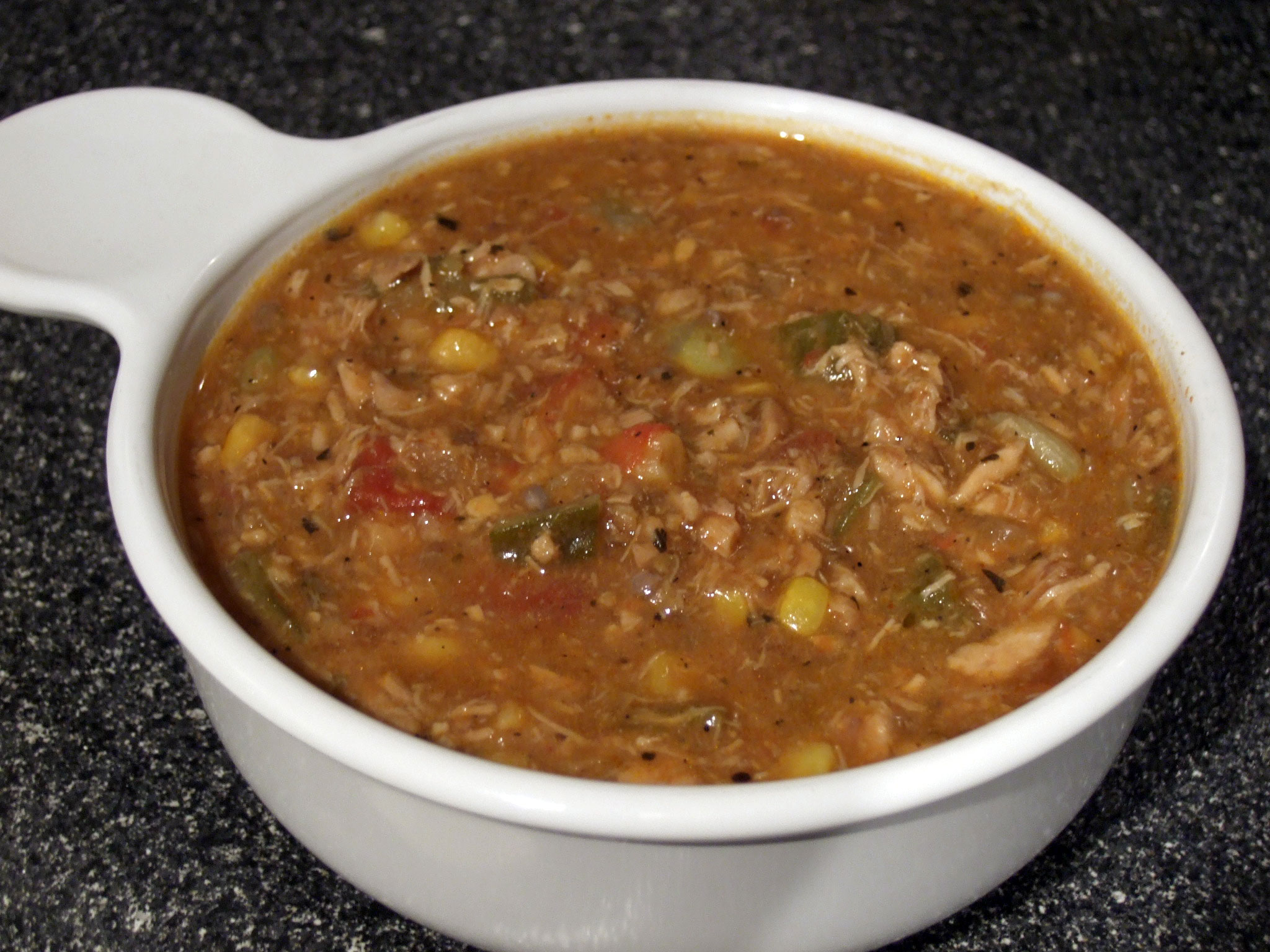
Brunswick stew made with chicken. The authentic dish contains squirrel or rabbit.

The people of Georgia claim that they invented Brunswick stew, a traditional dish now eaten throughout the southeastern United States which may also contain roadkill. There is a debate as to whether Brunswick stew was actually originally made near the town of Brunswick, Georgia, or in Brunswick County in southern Virginia. Mull is another cold-weather dish from Georgia, which may contain almost any type of meat including goat, dove, squirrel and (some say) rat and roadkill.

==== Illinois ====
A whitetail deer that is killed/injured due to a collision with a motor vehicle may be legally possessed by an individual if the following criteria are met:

1. The driver of a motor vehicle involved in a vehicle-deer collision has priority in possessing said deer. If the driver does not take possession of the deer before leaving the collision scene, any citizen of Illinois may possess and transport the deer.
2. There is no limit to the number of deer that may be possessed under these circumstances.

Road kill deer may only be claimed by persons who are residents of Illinois, are not delinquent in child support payments and do not have their wildlife privileges suspended in any state. Individuals who claim a deer killed in a vehicle collision shall report the possession of the road kill deer to the Department of Natural Resources by submitting a report to the IDNR within 24 hours by using the on-line Road Kill Deer Reporting Form or by telephoning the Department of Natural Resources no later than 4:30 p.m. on the next business day.

==== Kentucky ====
In Kentucky, the traditional roadkill stew or wild game stew is known as Burgoo, a stew-like soup of squirrel, rabbit, possum, mutton meat (or whatever meat is available) and vegetables, is declining in popularity, perhaps due to declines in traditional hunting. However, it is still widely served in Owensboro, the burgoo capital of the world.

==== Michigan ====
For at least the past 30 years, Michigan has allowed individuals who hit a deer to legally possess it. Upon hitting a deer, the driver was required to call local law enforcement and wait for them to come out to the accident scene; the driver could then receive a "Highway Killed Deer Permit" free of charge, if desired. As of September 28, 2014, this process has been streamlined and permission can be obtained via telephone by calling the DNR or local law enforcement.

==== New Jersey ====
In New Jersey, a permit is required for those who want to eat what are sometimes referred to as furry frisbees. In February 2005, following complaints by the New Jersey Society for the Prevention of Cruelty to Animals, Kraft Foods decided to stop production of Trolli U.S. Road Kill Gummies. The society complained that the products, shaped as partly flattened squirrels, chickens and snakes, would give children incorrect messages about the proper treatment of animals.

==== Tennessee ====
Tennessee's legislature has considered legalizing the eating of flattened fauna except domestic pets, a proposal that drew a flood of ridicule due to the awkward wording of the bill introduced by state senator Tim Burchett. The bill may not have been entirely necessary: an officer of the Tennessee Wildlife Resources Agency stated that "no wildlife officer would have charged a citizen with possession of road kill with intent to eat."

==== Texas ====
In May 2002, representatives of People for the Ethical Treatment of Animals (PETA) called on the Texas legislature to legalize the eating of roadkill. However, a law passed in 2007 to prohibit hunting of wildlife from roads appears to also make collection of roadkill illegal. A Texas Parks and Wildlife official said that "The department strongly encourages all persons to avoid engaging in the collection of any animal life on public roads".

==== Washington ====
Washington state began allowing the salvage of roadkill deer and elk in 2016. Salvagers must collect the entire carcass and then print a free permit from the Washington State Department of Fish and Wildlife website within 24 hours of the collection. Roadside deer carcasses cannot be scavenged in Clark, Cowlitz and Wahkiakum counties, because those areas are habitat for the federally protected Columbian white-tailed deer.

In the program's first year, about 1,600 permits were issued for the collection of roadkill deer and elk.

==== West Virginia ====
Under West Virginia state code §20-2-4, it is legal to take home and eat roadkill. Jeff Eberbaugh's Gourmet Style Road Kill Cooking was a runaway success in West Virginia when it was published in 1991. The town of Marlinton, West Virginia holds a road-kill cook-off each fall during the last Saturday of September, which attracts thousands of visitors each year. The festival features dishes such as pothole possum stew, fricasseed wabbit gumbo, teriyaki marinated bear, and deer sausage. While the food at this festival doesn't actually involve real roadkill, the dishes are prepared with the kinds of animals that are commonly knocked down by cars.

==== Wisconsin ====
A motorist who hits and kills an animal is entitled to keep it, but they must first obtain a free tag from the local authorities (sheriff or police department). If the motorist who killed the animal does not wish to claim it, anyone else can contact the authorities and request a free tag for the animal.

=== Finland ===
Found roadkills are considered waste, while in car crashes involving European elk or bear, the meat is inspected and auctioned by police.

== Rationales ==
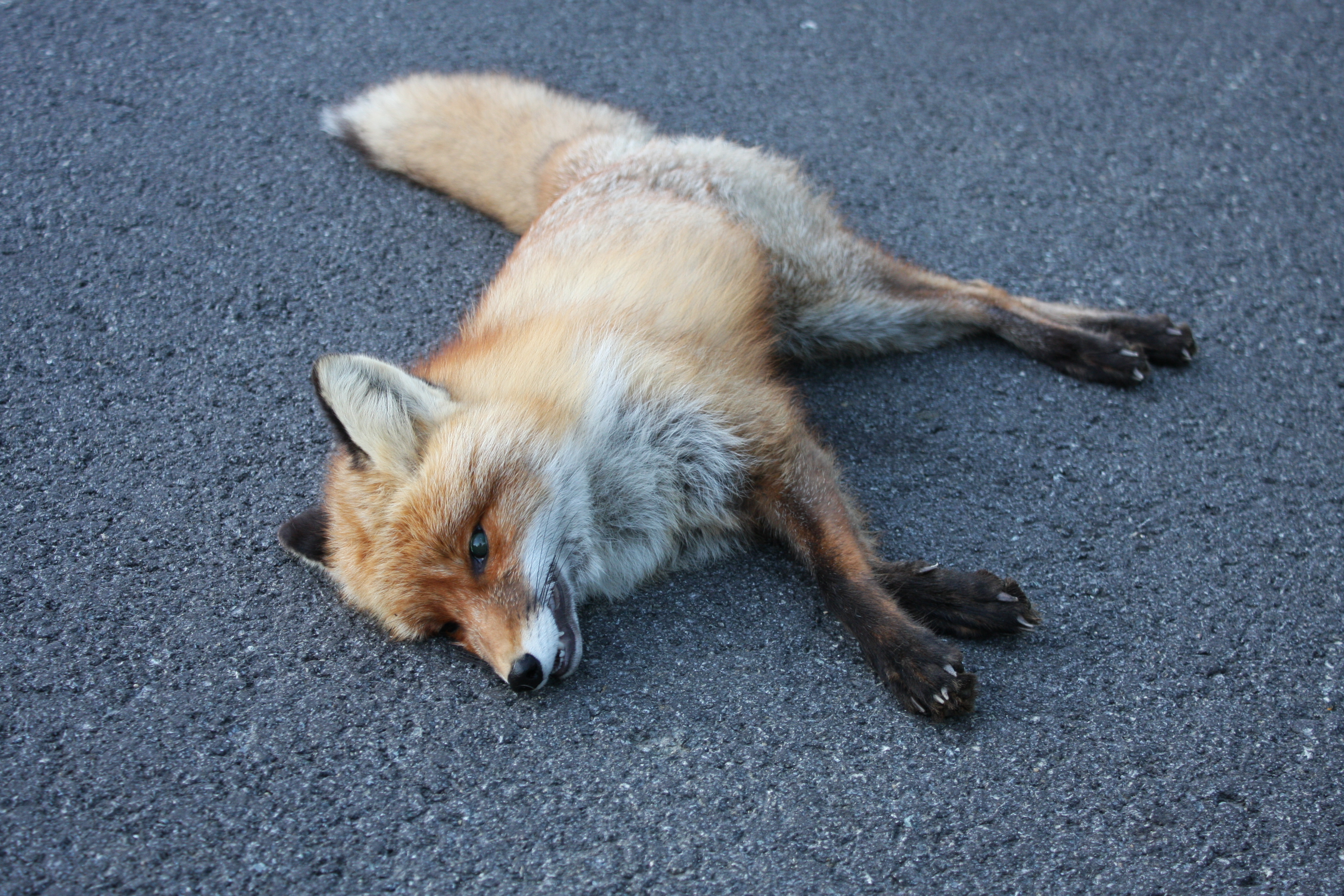
Red fox

Citing the meat's freshness, that it is organic, and free, some alternative/natural food commenters have taken to scavenging for roadkill. In his book The Revolution Will Not be Microwaved, Sandor Ellix Katz makes the case for eating roadkill in the name of sustainability. Katz talks at length about a North Carolina "earthskills" collective whose members turned to eating roadkill in the spring of 2002, and who have now become a center of information on evaluating, skinning and cooking roadkill as well as turning the hides to good use. The American right-wing activist group Media Research Center has called Katz's views “bizarre and extreme”, while alleging his ties to “left-wing environmental groups”.

In a discussion on the issue the Australian philosopher and animal rights author Peter Singer said,

I am opposed to subjecting animals to unnecessary pain and killing for food. Even so ... when a deer is accidentally hit by a car ... killing the animal to remove the pain is, in my opinion, justified and ethical. If an animal has been killed in an accident or is killed to prevent additional suffering before it dies and if this dead animal is a source of food, why not eat it when it is edible?

The theme of environmental responsibility is taken up in a number of publications by radical environmentalists, such as "Igniting a revolution: voices in defense of the earth". People for the Ethical Treatment of Animals (PETA) wrote a tongue-in-cheek article referencing the phenomenon, which urges non-vegetarians to "kick their unhealthy meat addictions", including a description of roadkill as "meat without murder" and a suggestion that "die-hard meat-eaters can help clear their consciences—and the streets—by eating roadkill."

== Nutritional value ==
Wild animals, the primary constituent of roadkill, are usually lower in calories and saturated fat than domestic meat, while being higher in Omega-3 polyunsaturated fats and slightly lower in overall fat. Nutritional values for 100 grams (about 3.5 ounces) of uncooked, lean meat except where otherwise noted:

	Calories kcal	Protein (grams)	Fat (grams)	Saturated fat (grams)	Cholesterol (mg)
Pronghorn	117	22.4	2.5		?
Badger					
American black bear, cooked	163	20.1	8.3		?
Beaver	146	24.1	4.8		
Bison	104	21.9	1.4		62
White-tailed deer	121	23.5	2.4	1.2	
Mule deer	119	22.6	2.7		107
Elk	112	22.4	2.0		67
Frog legs	73	16.5	0.3	0.0	
Groundhog	221	30.6	10.6	1.2	
Hedgehog					
Kangaroo	98	22.0	1.0		23
Opossum	221	30.6	10.6	1.2	
Pheasant	133	23.6	3.0	1.2	66
Quail (breast w/o skin)	122	22.3	3.5	1.2	
Rabbit	114	22.3	2.4	1.2	
Raccoon	211	24.7	11.8	3.5	82
Squirrel	119	21.2	3.5	0.0	
Turkey (wild - white meat)	158	21.2	7.1	2.4	
Turtle	89	20.0	0.6	0.0	
Beef (range-grazed)	112	21.8	2.4		72
Beef (grain-fed)	136	21.7	5.0		75

== Popular culture ==
The writer Richard Marcou and illustrator Randy Wall collaborated to write How to Cook... Road Kill "Goremet Cooking", a tongue-in-cheek recipe book for roadkill. Each copy is dubbed a glove compartment edition for the cook on the road.

Roadkill stew has become part of North American popular culture. A frequently told joke about rednecks or other groups of rural people asks how many it takes to eat a raccoon or opossum, with the punch line "Three. Two to do it and one to watch for cars". "Road Kill Stew", sung to the tune of "Three Blind Mice", is sung at some summer camps. Many artists have recorded variants on the theme, such as Joe Adee with his Road Kill Stew Possum Tour and Honky Tonk Confidential with their album Road Kill Stew and Other News.

Clinton Tyree, also known as Skink, is a recurring character in novels by Carl Hiaasen. He is a former governor of Florida "turned environmental guerrilla" who lives rough in the Florida wilderness and regularly eats roadkill.

The term "Roadkill Cafe" is sometimes considered a joke, with the tagline "You kill it, we grill it" or "From your grill to ours". However, there are several real Roadkill Cafes in existence, none known to be associated with each other.

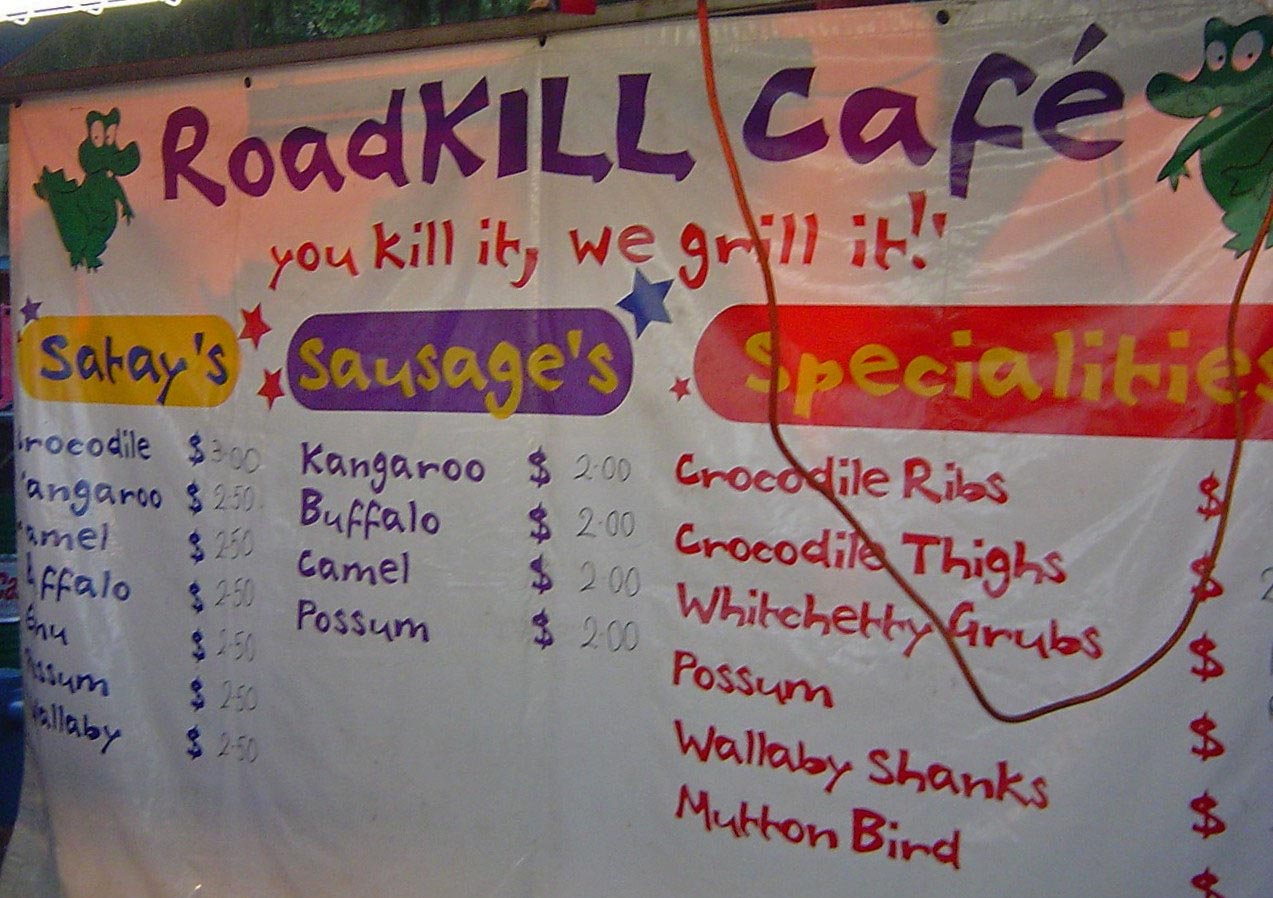
Roadkill Cafe at the Mindil Beach Sunset Markets in Darwin, Australia, carrying the motto "You kill it, we grill it"

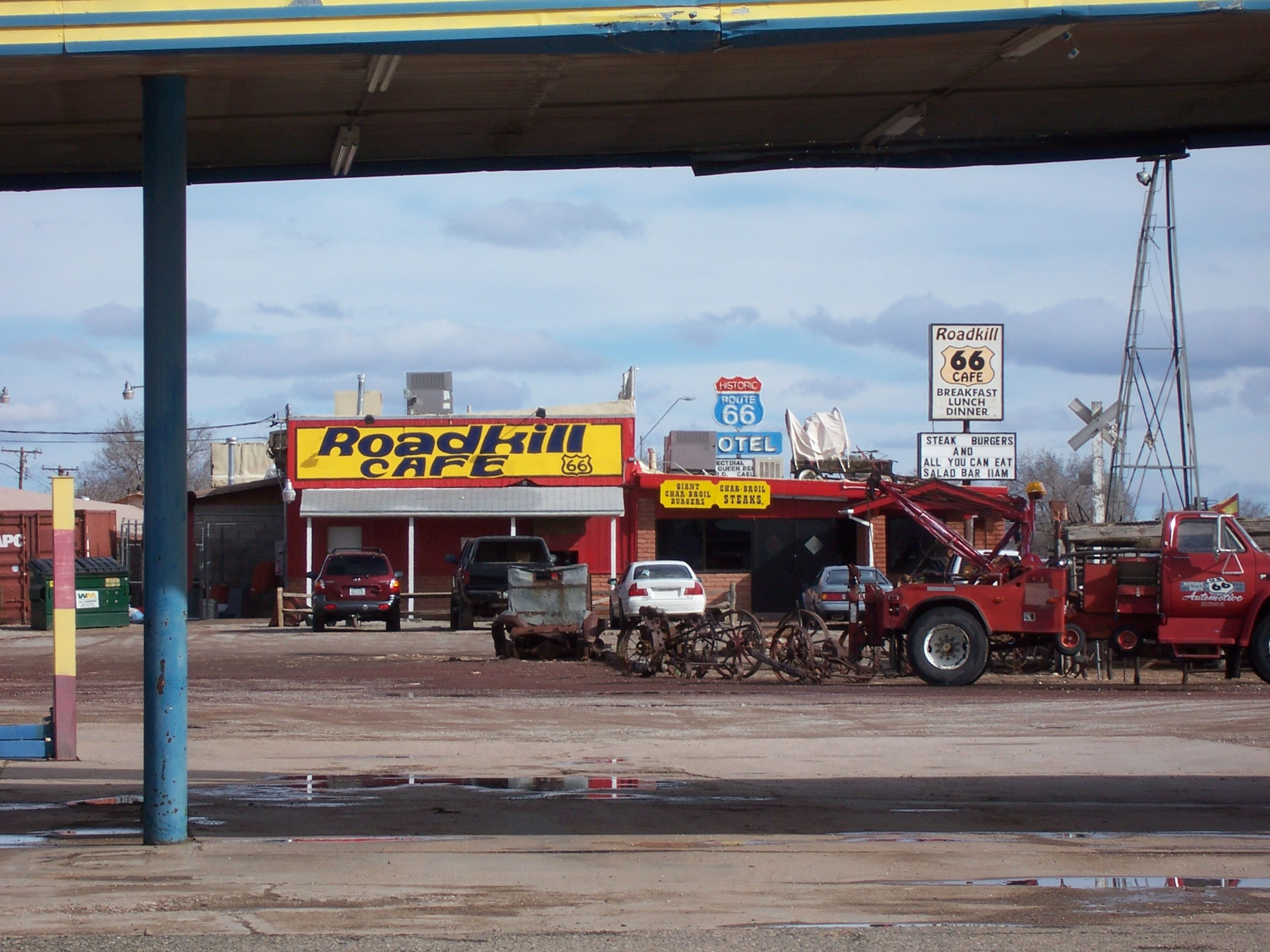
Roadkill Cafe in Seligman, Arizona

== See also ==
- Bushmeat
- Double-dead meat
