= Lucky You (The Lightning Seeds song) =

1994 song by The Lightning Seeds

Single by the Lightning Seeds

from the album Jollification
- Released: 8 August 1994
- Length: 3:53
- Label: Epic
- Songwriters: Ian Broudie; Terry Hall
- Producers: Ian Broudie; Simon Rogers

The Lightning Seeds singles chronology
"The Life of Riley" (1992)	"Lucky You" (1994)	"Change" (1995)

Music video
- "Lucky You" on YouTube

"Lucky You" is a song by British alternative rock band The Lightning Seeds, released on 8 August 1994 by Epic Records as the first single from their third studio album, Jollification (1994). It is written by Ian Broudie and Terry Hall, and produced by Broudie and Simon Rogers. The song peaked at number 15 on the UK Singles Chart.

== Background and composition ==
"Lucky You" was co-written by Ian Broudie, Terry Hall, and features Terry very noticeably on backing vocals. Instead of a snare drum, there's a handclap in the main verses and in the intro and bridge, various noises loaded into a sampler. A usual Lightning Seeds blend of upbeat melody, dizzying backing vocals and melacholic, doubting lyrics make up Lucky You.

== Release and reception ==
"Lucky You" was the lead single for Jollification and was well-received upon its release. However, it failed to break the top 40 UK singles chart, stalling at 43. After a period of touring, heavy promotion and a better success rate for singles Change, Marvellous and Perfect, Lucky You was re-released in 1995. With a different promo video, the re-release reached number 15.

== Music video ==
There were two music videos. The first music video featured Ian Broudie, Martyn Campbell, Chris Sharrock and Mike Badger in a warehouse. There are dancers, monkeys, the word Pop features heavily and there's lots of Jollification inspired imagery. The second video for the 1995 re-release, preferred by Ian Broudie, is a much simpler "playback" affair and features the touring line up with some fancy filters and effects.

== Track listing ==
1994 issue

1. Single version

2. Lunar Mix

3. Hard Luck Mix

4. Lunar Cabaret Mix

1995 issue

CD 1:

1. Lucky You (single version)

2. The Life of Riley (live)

3. Pure (live)

4. Here Today (live)

CD 2 (Fruit Machine Pack):

1. Lucky You (Single Version)

2. Open Your Eyes

3. The Likely Lads

== Charts ==
=== Weekly charts ===
Chart (1995)	Peak position
Scotland (OCC)	12
UK Singles (OCC)	15
US Maxi-Singles Sales (Billboard)	25
US Modern Rock Tracks (Billboard)	29

=== Year-end charts ===
Chart (1995)	Position
Latvia (Latvijas Top 50)	44
UK Airplay (Music Week)	40
