= Tourist Season =

1986 novel by Carl Hiaasen

- First edition
- Author: Carl Hiaasen
- Cover artist: George Corsillo
- Language: English
- Genre: Crime novel
- Publisher: G. P. Putnam's Sons
- Publication date: 1986
- Publication place: United States
- Media type: Print (hardback and paperback)
- Pages: 272
- ISBN: 0-399-13145-0
- OCLC: 12663997
- Dewey Decimal: 813/.54 19
- LC Class: PS3558.I217 T68 1986
- Followed by: Double Whammy

Tourist Season is a 1986 novel by Carl Hiaasen. It was his first solo novel, after co-writing several mystery/thriller novels with William Montalbano.

== Plot ==
Las Noches de Diciembre (Spanish, "The Nights of December") is a small terrorist cell led by rogue newspaper columnist Skip Wiley. Skip believes that the only way to save Florida's natural beauty from destruction is to violently dissuade tourists from visiting and/or settling in the state. Recruiting three comrades with similar vendettas against the state's establishment, they begin a spree of flashy kidnappings, murders and bombings to frighten off new arrivals. Their first victim is B.D. "Sparky" Harper, the head of Miami's Chamber of Commerce. Sparky's body is found stuffed into an oversized suitcase, dressed in a garish tourist outfit, smeared with sunscreen and with his legs amputated. Next, the group starts kidnapping and killing random tourists and residents, many of whom are fed to a giant crocodile nicknamed "Pavlov."

Brian Keyes, a private investigator and former reporter for the Miami Sun, is hired to help defend petty burglar Ernesto Cabal, who was caught driving Sparky's stolen car. Brian does not believe that Ernesto killed Sparky, but Miami police dismiss him. Ernesto commits suicide when told by his own lawyer that the case is a lost cause. Brian is then hired by Nell Bellamy to find her missing husband (the first tourist victim) and by Sun editor Cab Mulcahy to locate the missing Skip. After an encounter with his ex-girlfriend Jenna (who is now dating Skip), Brian tracks Skip to the Everglades and is captured by Las Noches. Revealing himself, Skip tells Brian to return to Miami and spread the word of the group's demands. He then has Brian watch as their latest victim is fed to Pavlov. Brian tries to stop the murder and is stabbed in the back by one of Skip's followers, a Cuban named Jesús Bernal. He is returned to Miami and treated in the hospital.

Since it is the start of tourist season, the police's initial reaction to Brian's warnings is to engage in a cover-up, dismissing the Las Noches communiques as a hoax. Sun reporter Ricky Bloodworth uncovers the letters and writes an article but misspells the name of the group as "Las Nachos". The terrorists retaliate with several bombings, forcing the authorities to take them seriously. Brian's old friend, Detective Al Garcia, is appointed head of a task force to catch the terrorists. Based on Skip's hints, Brian, Cab and Al deduce that Las Noches plan to kidnap the Orange Bowl Queen. Since civic leaders refuse to cancel the Orange Bowl Parade or to provide the beauty queen with visible police protection, Al suggests hiring Brian as her undercover bodyguard. Brian finds the beauty queen, Kara Lynn Shivers, to be an intelligent girl who is only in the beauty queen "racket" to indulge her father. Brian and Kara Lynn grow closer, eventually developing a relationship.

While escorting Kara Lynn home from a tennis game, Brian catches Jesús loitering in the parking lot and beats him into submission with a racket. Furious that Jesús has foiled the group's element of surprise, Skip devises a new plan. Jesús, aching for reinstatement with the anti-Castro terrorist group he was expelled from, abandons Las Noches and sends a mail bomb to Al. Farcically, the bomb is instead opened by an over-eager Ricky, illegally sifting Garcia's mail for a scoop. Because of Jesús' poor construction, the bomb only injures Ricky. Al never learns that the bomb was addressed to him, and the bombing is attributed to Las Noches. The next evening, Skip uses a helicopter to bombard the deck of a cruise ship with shopping bags containing live snakes. As the panicked passengers dive off the ship and the Coast Guard is summoned, the helicopter unexpectedly crashes at sea before it reaches land. No bodies are recovered. Miami's civic leaders assume the terrorists are dead, but Brian and Al insist that their security precautions remain in place until after the parade.

In a last-ditch effort, Jesús kidnaps Al at gunpoint and drives him to Key Largo to be executed. Al is wounded in the shoulder by Jesús' shotgun, but Brian manages to track them down and kills Jesús. To his surprise, the parade proceeds without any sign of Las Noches. The following evening, during the Orange Bowl, Brian belatedly realizes that Kara Lynn is supposed to make a brief appearance during the game's halftime show and that Las Noches has chosen that moment to strike. Kara Lynn is kidnapped and carried out of the stadium on an airboat, though one of the terrorists, ex-football player "Viceroy" Wilson, is shot to death by her unofficial escort. Brian deduces from Skip's old press clippings that he has taken Kara Lynn to Osprey Island, a small nature preserve in the middle of Biscayne Bay. There, Skip reveals to Kara Lynn that the island has been mined with dynamite, to be exploded at dawn, to allow for the construction of a new condominium. He plans to leave her there, with the island's other remaining wildlife, so that her death will send a message to Florida's greedy developers.

Before Skip can depart, Brian arrives and disables him with a bullet to the leg. Skip initially refuses to tell Brian where he has anchored his boat, prepared to let the dynamite claim the three of them all at once. However, upon realizing that Brian has brought Jenna along, he surrenders the boat's location. To Brian's surprise, he refuses to go along with them. As they speed away from the island, Keyes, Kara Lynn and Jenna look back and see Skip is climbing a tree, trying to scare a bald eagle nesting there into taking flight before the dynamite explodes. The novel ends just as the "all clear" signal for the detonation is sounded, with the three of them whispering the same prayer: "Please fly away."

== Characters ==
=== Main characters ===
- Brian Keyes (32): a former reporter for the Sun, now a private detective.
- Cab Mulcahy: managing editor of the Sun, Keyes's friend and mentor.
- Ricky Bloodworth: wet-behind-the-ears reporter for the Sun. Energetic and ambitious, Bloodworth yearns for success in journalism, but lacks all the other qualities necessary for a good reporter, including sensitivity, tact, and basic writing skills.
- Al García: Detective Sergeant for the Metro-Dade Police Homicide unit.

=== Victims ===
- Theodore Bellamy, shriner
- B.D. "Sparky" Harper, president of the Miami Chamber of Commerce
- Renee LeVoux, tourist from Montreal
- Ida Kimmelman, retiree
- Dr. Remond Courtney, shill psychiatrist

=== Las Noches de Diciembre ===
- Skip Wiley (White, 37): A popular columnist for the Sun, leader and founder of Las Noches. Wiley wants to save the Florida environment by scaring tourists out of Florida. Wiley reasons that the entire Florida economy is dependent on tourism and emigration from other parts of America, and that without it the whole state structure will collapse.
- Daniel "Viceroy" Wilson (African-American, 36): formerly a star fullback for the Miami Dolphins football team, Wilson was cut from the team after critically injuring both knees. After several years as a drug addict and a petty criminal, he has cleaned up, educated himself, and dreams of revenge on the white-dominated establishment of Florida.
- Jesús Bernal (Cuban, late 20s): formerly a member of an anti-Castro group (the "First Weekend in July Movement") in Florida seeking to drive Castro from power and let Cuban exiles return home. Jesús was expelled from the movement after one mistake too many. Overflowing with machismo, he thinks of himself as the most experienced and well-trained of Las Noches at committing terrorist acts, but in fact is completely inept at anything except writing snappy press releases (a number of farcical situations in the novel arise from his attempts to plant homemade bombs). His militant politics are also something of a pose, since he was born and raised in New Jersey, graduated from Dartmouth College, and has never been to Cuba in his life.
- Tommy Tigertail (Seminole, mid-20s): A member of the Seminole Nation, and the source of Las Noches funding. Tommy is an innovator, largely responsible for turning white people's fetish for bingo into a multi-million dollar business for his tribe, and is also deeply aggrieved by the white men's actions against his ancestors, and their destruction of Florida's natural beauty.
- Pavlov: a giant American crocodile.
- Jenna: Skip's girlfriend, Brian's ex-girlfriend.

== Themes ==
The book is not only an example of the crime fiction genre, but a satire as well, of many subjects from tourism to sports to race relations to the newsroom. It also contains examples of the literary device of the red herring; for example, deep background is given to characters who appear briefly only to die off, which keeps the reader guessing as to who will make it to the end of the book.

Hiaasen is a newspaper columnist from the Miami Herald. In an interview, he said that he took much of his inspiration from his work on the Herald. Readers may believe that Skip Wiley is a slightly more crazed version of the author; both are newspaper columnists, and both are very passionate and entertaining writers. One theme that persists in the book is moral ambiguity; while Brian Keyes understands the value of Skip Wiley's ends, Keyes would have preferred a less violent means. Their conflict arises as a matter of where they place their allegiance: Brian Keyes to humankind, and Skip Wiley to the wild.

Hiaasen's novels typically deal with distinctly Floridian themes such as environmental destruction of unique ecosystems, the inability to sustain rapid growth, and crooked politicians, among others.

== Cultural references ==
- Jimmy Buffett, a friend of Hiaasen's, based a song on the novel, The Ballad of Skip Wiley. The song also incorporates Hiaasen's character of former Governor Clinton "Skink" Tyree, a later creation of Hiaasen.
- Garcia comments that Las Noches crimes are making Richard Speck, a serial killer, look tame by comparison; likewise, when Jenna claims that Skip is a better man than Brian because he "makes things happen," Brian retorts, "so did Juan Corona[.]" Corona was a Mexican-American serial killer with at least 25 known victims.
- The terrorist group that Jesus Bernal belongs to, "The First Weekend in July Movement," is fictional, but Bernal refers to several real-life anti-Castro terrorist groups operating in South Florida, including Omega 7 and Alpha 66.
- When Reed Shivers, Kara Lynn's father, dismisses the risk to his daughter's safety from "a bunch of losers," Keyes reminds him that "one nut can shoot the damn President in Dealey Plaza," referring to the assassination of John F. Kennedy by Lee Harvey Oswald.
- There are multiple references to the early history of Florida that most of the novel's characters remain willfully ignorant of, including the Second Seminole War, Miami's initial founding as Fort Dallas, and the actions of early land barons such as Henry Flagler and Carl Fisher.
- Sparky Harper inaugurated the Orange Bowl Friendship Cruise in 1980, but attendance was low during the first year as a result of the Liberty City riots and the Mariel boatlift.

== Continuity with Hiaasen's other works ==
- Though Clinton Tyree, one of Hiaasen's few recurring characters, makes his debut in the subsequent novel Double Whammy, Tyree shares much of Skip Wiley's passionate environmentalism and anger at corruption, though not his indiscriminate murderousness.
- Al Garcia makes his first appearance as one of Hiaasen's recurring characters.
- During the civic meeting to discuss Las Noches, a city leader laments half-jokingly that he wishes they had targeted Disney World instead of Miami. In Hiaasen's subsequent novel Native Tongue, the fictional "Amazing Kingdom" theme park carries heavy influence with South Florida politicians, largely because they blame Disney World for siphoning tourists' custom from South Florida to Orlando.
- Several of Hiaasen's novels feature a recurring joke that radiology is a "soft" medical discipline and those that practice it are not "real" doctors. This novel features the first such joke: aboard the Orange Bowl cruise, a tourist couple introduce themselves as a doctor and his wife; a few minutes later when his wife is bitten by a snake the "doctor" does nothing, explaining that "I'm just a radiologist!"
- Tommy Tigertail, the only surviving member of Las Noches, reappears peripherally in Hiaasen's novel Nature Girl. He is a prominent and influential elder of the Seminole tribe and has recanted his more radical sentiments. He also tells his nephew Sammy about Wiley, whom Tommy believes was reincarnated as a bald eagle. In an ironic scene, just such an eagle perches briefly over the nature-hating antagonist of that novel Boyd Shreave, and defecates on his head.
- Tommy dwells several times on the topic of the Second Seminole War in Tourist Season. His Nature Girl is the first novel to return to the topic.

== Other media ==
An audiobook version of Tourist Season was released in 1998 by Recorded Books. The audiobook, read by George Wilson, is unabridged and runs 13 hours 48 minutes over 12 CDs.
