= Lucky You (play) =

Lucky You is a theatre adaptation of the bestselling novel by Carl Hiaasen that premiered at the 2008 Edinburgh Festival Fringe.

The play was adapted by Denis Calandra and Francis Matthews, directed by Francis Matthews, produced by Katharine Doré and Jon Plowman, with music composed by Loudon Wainwright III. It stars Nicola Alexis, Trevor White, Corey Johnson, Alexandra Gilbreath, Josh Cohen, Kristina Mitchell, Geff Francis and Paul Reynolds.
