= Lucky You (novel) =

1997 novel by Carl Hiaasen

- First edition
- Author: Carl Hiaasen
- Language: English
- Publisher: Alfred A. Knopf
- Publication date: Nov 1997
- Publication place: United States
- Media type: Print (Hardback & Paperback)
- Pages: 353
- ISBN: 0-679-45444-6
- Preceded by: Stormy Weather
- Followed by: Sick Puppy

Lucky You is a 1997 novel by Carl Hiaasen. It is set in Florida, and recounts the story of JoLayne Lucks, a black woman who is one of two winners of a lottery.

The book parodies paranoid militia movement groups that believe in somewhat bizarre conspiracy theories. It also takes a satiric look at the fictional community of Grange, Florida, (based on the real community of Cassadaga) and its cottage tourist industry based on the "discovery" of various religious miracles.

A theatrical adaptation premiered in Edinburgh in 2008.

== Plot summary ==
Newspaper reporter Tom Krome is sent to interview JoLayne Lucks, an African-American veterinary assistant who holds one of two winning Florida Lottery tickets. The other winning ticket is held by Bode Gazzer and his best friend "Chub," two unemployed white supremacists who are the only members of a fledgling militia. Unwilling to accept only half of the $28 million jackpot, Bode insists that they track down the owner of the other winning ticket. Discovering that this other winner is black seems to vindicate his conspiracy theory that the government is keeping "Christian white men" from winning the lottery, making his and Chub's next decision easy.

After Bode and Chub savagely beat JoLayne and steal her ticket, she appears at Tom's hotel room pleading for help. Tom urges her to contact the police, but she says she can't: she plans to use the lottery proceeds to buy Simmons Wood, a pristine forest plot near her home, to prevent it being redeveloped; she can't afford to wait for the police, since a labor union in Chicago has already made an offer for the property. Meanwhile, Bode and Chub approach "Shiner," the clerk at the convenience store where JoLayne bought her winning ticket, and convince him to hand over the security video showing her purchase by playing on his small-town boredom and offering him a place within the new "brotherhood."

When Tom's editor refuses to allow any investigation into the lottery theft, Tom quits and helps JoLayne track down the robbers via her stolen credit card. JoLayne provides her friend Moffitt, an agent with the Bureau of Alcohol, Tobacco and Firearms (ATF), with the robbers' license plate number. Moffitt identifies Bode and searches his apartment, deducing that the ticket has likely been concealed inside a condom in his wallet. Moffitt leaves an ominous message on Bode's wall that sends his paranoia into overdrive, leading to the robbers fleeing in Bode's truck. Before doing so, Chub orders Shiner to kidnap Amber, a waitress at Hooters who he has become smitten with, and bring her to his and Bode's refuge.

Meanwhile, Tom is surprised to hear from his lawyer that his house has exploded. His girlfriend, Katie, is married to a violent circuit court judge named Arthur Battenkill, who sent his law clerk Champ Powell to burn down Tom's house. Champ accidentally ignited the fire with himself inside, and his remains are similar enough to Tom's for the coroner to declare Tom dead. Unknown to Tom, his lawyer plans to use the situation to his client's advantage: his estranged wife, Mary Andrea, has gone to absurd lengths to avoid being served with divorce papers, including assuming false names and traveling throughout the U.S. and Canada. Tom's lawyer predicts that Mary Andrea, an actress, will attempt to capitalize on the publicity surrounding his "death" and return to Florida long enough for her to be served.

Bode and Chub steal a motorboat and plan to make a refuge on Pearl Key, a small island in Florida Bay. However, because of their inept navigational skills, Tom and JoLayne easily follow them in a boat of their own. As Tom predicted, tension over Amber's presence—coupled with Shiner's belated realization that Bode and Chub never intended to share the jackpot with him—eventually causes the three men to argue, allowing Tom and JoLayne to ambush and disarm them. Chub is interrupted in his attempt to rape Amber by a shotgun wound to his shoulder, while Bode is knocked unconscious and tied up, allowing JoLayne to remove a lottery ticket from his wallet. Tom sends Amber and Shiner back to the mainland in the thugs' boat, with Amber armed with Chub's revolver to make sure Shiner behaves.

Bode loosens his bonds and tries to escape in the only remaining boat. While wrestling with Tom in the shallows, he inadvertently kicks a napping stingray and his femoral artery is pierced. JoLayne does her best to treat Chub's gunshot wound, but can do nothing to save Bode. Tom and JoLayne depart the island in the remaining boat, leaving Chub behind with some meager supplies. They collect JoLayne's first lottery payout in Tallahassee and return to her hometown in time to bid against the mob-controlled union for Simmons Wood. At first, Bernard Squires, the union's representative, willing to outbid JoLayne, but Moffitt threatens to put him and his real employer in the newspapers. Squires withdraws from the negotiations and flees to South America with $250,000 in cash from the union.

While Shiner is driving her home, Amber is surprised to discover the other winning ticket (the one originally belonging to JoLayne) hidden in an empty chamber of Chub's revolver. With Shiner's reluctant agreement, she decides to return the ticket to JoLayne. The crowning irony of the novel is that, throughout the story, Bode and Chub are the only ones who know that they are the rightful owners of the second winning ticket; the other characters act from the belief that there is only one winning ticket in their possession, which eventually results in both tickets winding up with JoLayne.

A chance meeting at the newspaper office brings Katie and Mary Andrea into contact, and they say their goodbyes to Tom. Katie informs on her husband to the police, leading to his arrest for felony murder. Chub, unable to attract the attention of passing boats or aircraft, eventually dies on Pearl Key. Tom and JoLayne, now a couple and the holders of both winning lotto tickets, decide to make their home near Simmons Wood, now safe from development.

== Allusions to real-life persons, places, or events ==
- The novel was published in the aftermath of the Oklahoma City bombing in 1995 (an event which Bode claims was the work of the U.S. government, trying to frame two innocent white men). The bombing inspired a brief media focus on American militia movements, which Hiaasen parodies with the characters of Bode and Chub:

Bodean James Gazzer had spent thirty-one years perfecting the art of assigning blame. His personal credo - Everything bad that happens is someone else's fault - could, with imagination, be stretched to fit any circumstance. Bode stretched it. The intestinal unrest that occasionally afflicted him surely was the result of drinking milk taken from secretly radiated cows. The roaches in his apartment were planted by his filthy immigrant next-door neighbors. His dire financial plight was caused by runaway bank computers and conniving Wall Street Zionists; his bad luck in the South Florida job market, prejudice against English-speaking applicants. Even the lousy weather had a culprit: air pollution from Canada, diluting the ozone and derailing the jet stream... A series of unhealthy friendships eventually drew Bode Gazzer into the culture of hate and hard-core bigotry. Previously, when dishing out fault for his plight, Bode had targeted generic authority figures - parents, brothers, cops, judges - without considering factors such as race, religion or ethnicity. He'd swung broadly, and without much impact. But xenophobia and racism infused his griping with new vitriol. All of [Chub]'s siblings made it to Georgia State University, and [Chub] himself could have gone there, too, had he not by age fifteen already chosen a life of sloth, inebriation and illiteracy... Chub felt an instant kinship with Bode, whose global theories and braided explanations struck a comforting chord. For instance, Chub had been stung when his parents scorned him as a tax cheat, but Bode Gazzer made him feel better by enumerating the many sound reasons why no full-blooded white American male should give a nickel to the Infernal Revenue. Chub brightened to learn that what he'd initially regarded as ducking a debt was, in fact, an act of legitimate civil protest.

- Bode has decorated his apartment with portraits of David Koresh, David Duke, Gordon Kahl, Randy Weaver, and other anti-government, and/or pro-gun or pro-racism figures. A sticker on his pickup truck's bumper reads "Mark Fuhrman for President". Likewise, Chub's trailer home features stickers and T-shirts with mottoes such as "Fry O. J." and "God Bless Marge Schott".
- Krome sarcastically refers to Sinclair as "a regular Ben Bradlee" after Sinclair's timid refusal to let Krome pursue the robbery story.
- Moffit refers to the Bureau of Alcohol, Tobacco and Firearms' disastrous raid on Koresh's compound in Waco, Texas.
- While evading her husband's process servers, Mary Andrea Finley Krome uses the alias "Julie Channing," as a tribute to her two favorite Broadway performers (presumably Julie Andrews and Carol Channing).
- When JoLayne challenges Tom to name African-American musicians he is fond of, he lists Marvin Gaye, Jimi Hendrix, B.B. King, Al Green, Billy Preston, "the Hootie guy," (Darius Rucker), and later Robert Cray;
- JoLayne jokes that she wouldn't mind accompanying Tom on his planned move to Alaska, even if there are not many other African-Americans living there; "one would be fine, long as it's Luther Vandross."
