= Buck Peterson =

American humor writer

Buck Peterson (born in Minnesota) is an American humor writer and cookbook author, best known for The Original Road Kill Cookbook (1985) containing cooking recipes for animals that have been struck and killed by motor vehicles, such as roadkills, which he believes to be a highly underrated food source.

In the early 1980s, he wrote food and wine articles for Playboy.

== Bibliography ==
- The Original Road Kill Cookbook. Ten Speed Press. 1985. ISBN 0-89815-200-3.
- Buck Peterson's Guide to Indoor Life. Ten Speed Press. 1992. ISBN 0-89815-468-5
- Endangered Species Cookbook. Ten Speed Press. 1993. ISBN 0-89815-556-8
- The International Road Kill Cookbook. Ten Speed Press. 1994. ISBN 0-89815-567-3.
- The Totaled Roadkill Cookbook. Celestial Arts. 1996. ISBN 0-89087-812-9.
- Wildlife of the New Millennium. Longstreet Press. 1999. ISBN 1-56352-546-1
- The Roadkill USA Coloring & Activity Book. Ten Speed Press. 2001. ISBN 1-58008-279-3
- The Compleat Waterfo(u)wler: A Discourse on Duck Hunting with a Little Goose on the Side. The Lyons Press. 2003. ISBN 1-58574-776-9.
- Buck Peterson's Complete Guide to Fishing. Ten Speed Press. 2006. ISBN 1-58008-736-1.
- The Redneck Wedding Planner.. Broadway Books. 2006. ISBN 0-7679-2135-6
- Buck Peterson's Complete Guide to Deer Hunting. Ten Speed Press. 2006. ISBN 1-58008-738-8.
- Buck Peterson's Complete Guide to Bird Hunting. Ten Speed Press. 2007. ISBN 978-1-58008-739-1.
- Peterson, B. R.; McLean, J. Angus (2010). Quick-fix cooking with roadkill. Kansas City, Missouri: Andrews McMeel Publishing, LLC. ISBN 978-1-4494-0199-3. OCLC 776997153.
