= Native Tongue (Hiaasen novel) =

1991 novel by Carl Hiaasen

- First edition
- Author: Carl Hiaasen
- Language: English
- Genre: Mystery
- Publisher: Alfred A. Knopf
- Publication date: 1991
- Publication place: United States
- Media type: Print (hard and paperback)
- Pages: 325 pp
- ISBN: 0-394-58796-0
- OCLC: 24281597
- Dewey Decimal: 813/.54 20
- LC Class: PS3558.I217 N38 1991

Native Tongue is a novel by Carl Hiaasen, published in 1991. Like all his novels, it is set in Florida. The themes of the novel include corruption, environmentalism, exploitation of endangered species, and animal rights.

== Synopsis ==
Joe Winder, a former investigative reporter, now works in the public relations department for the Amazing Kingdom of Thrills, a theme park located on North Key Largo, Florida. Joe's dulled investigative instincts are roused by the theft of two endangered "Blue Tongued Mango Voles" from the park's rare animal pavilion. His boss, Charles Chelsea, discourages him from looking into the theft, but Joe secretly questions Dr. Will Koocher, the young biologist hired to supervise the captive breeding of the voles.

The Amazing Kingdom's founder and owner is Francis X. Kingsbury, a.k.a. Frankie King, a convicted racketeer who relocated to Florida under the Witness Protection Program after testifying against several mid-level members of John Gotti's crime family. Having discovered a previously unknown talent for selling real estate, Frankie has become very wealthy after building the Kingdom. His next project is to build Falcon Trace, an enormous vacation resort near the park, blatantly ignoring the proximity of a federal wildlife preserve.

The theft of the voles was commissioned by Molly McNamara, the elderly founder of a small environmentalist group called the Mothers of Wilderness. Unfortunately the two burglars she hired, Bud Schwartz and Danny Pogue, carelessly kill both voles during the getaway. Furious, Molly gives both burglars non-fatal gunshot wounds and forcibly recruits them into the group. Meanwhile Joe, who opposes Falcon Trace, keeps investigating the theft. The Kingdom's trained orca suddenly dies, and Will's dead body is found lodged in its throat during the autopsy. Joe refuses to let go of his suspicions of foul play, and the Kingdom's security chief, Pedro Luz, catches him searching Will's office for clues.

Charlie decides to fire Joe, but not before Joe reveals he's uncovered the motive for Will's murder: a bottle of blue food coloring hidden in the vole lab, meaning Will had discovered that the "endangered" voles were fake and was silenced before he could expose the hoax. Meanwhile, Molly sends Bud and Danny to burglarize Frankie's office at the Kingdom, looking for proof of illegal activities connected with Falcon Trace. Among Frankie's private files, Bud finds news clippings and correspondence showing his true identity as a former mobster.

Unknown to Molly, Bud and Danny approach Frankie and blackmail him for the return of the files. Frightened of the mob's retaliation, Frankie promises a large sum. Bud and Danny are elated, but return to Molly's condominium to find her savagely beaten–Frankie sent Pedro to give her "a warning" after her group picketed the opening ceremony of Falcon Trace. Joe's girlfriend Nina leaves him after he loses his job, but he finds allies in Carrie Lanier, an actress who plays one of the Kingdom's animal characters, and "Skink," a hermit who lives wild in the Key Largo woods. Both men agree that the law can do little to punish Frankie for Will's murder.

Joe sabotages equipment at the Falcon Trace construction site and, with Carrie's encouragement, issues phony press releases about the park. Charlie counters each of these releases, while Pedro unsuccessfully tries to kill Joe. Under Skink's guidance, Joe and Carrie meet and compare notes with Molly, Bud and Danny, leading Joe to learn of Frankie's true identity. When Bud and Danny appear to exchange Frankie's files for the blackmail money, Pedro and one of his security guards try to kill them instead. The burglars escape, and an enraged Bud tracks down a mid-ranking Gotti associate to inform him of Frankie's whereabouts. A hit man is sent, but his shot accidentally wounds a golf pro standing next to Frankie.

Disguised in Carrie's animal costume, Joe enters the park and, with Bud and Danny's help, confronts Frankie in his office. Joe offers him a graceful way out, giving him a press release announcing that he will cancel Falcon Trace for environmentally conscious reasons. Joe reminds Frankie that since he obtained the permits for Falcon Trace under a false name and hired convicted felons as security guards, he will be in violation of his probation. As Frankie considers taking Joe's offer, Pedro bursts in, disarms Joe and marches him out of the office. Frankie orders him killed. Skink rescues Joe and pitches Pedro into the whale tank, where he drowns while being raped by a bottlenose dolphin.

Skink rejects Joe's subtle approach in favor of burning the Kingdom down. After the two men watch Carrie's first and last performance as the star of the Kingdom's Jubilee parade, Skink trips the park's fire alarm and causes the tourists and employees to flee. As Frankie tries to find his security detail, he is shot dead by the hit man. Joe and Carrie escape the burning park on foot while Molly, Danny and Bud watch the proceedings on television. In the epilogue, Falcon Trace is acquired by outside investors with plans to continue the development, but the project is halted when the Mothers of Wilderness report a sighting of two more of the presumed-extinct voles in the nearby woods. The land, and the remains of the Amazing Kingdom, are replanted and eventually incorporated into the nearby nature preserve.

== Characters ==
- Joe Winder: The protagonist of the book. He works in public relations for The Amazing Kingdom, and was formerly an investigative reporter.
- Carrie Lanier: Winder's love interest. An aspiring actress who currently plays one of the animal characters at the Amazing Kingdom.
- Charles Chelsea: Vice President of public relations for The Amazing Kingdom, and Winder's immediate boss. A true spin doctor, he is so terrified of Kingsbury's displeasure that he will cover up anything remotely unpleasant that happens at the Kingdom.
- Pedro Luz: The fitness-obsessed head of security at The Amazing Kingdom, a corrupt ex-policeman who combines steroids with an IV drip.
- Molly McNamara: The seemingly 'sweet' old lady who hires two former robbers to steal the voles. She is a member of the Mothers of Wilderness, a fictional environmentalist group whose highly funded work usually comes to nothing.
- Bud Schwartz and Danny Pogue: The two burglars hired by Molly.
- Skink, otherwise known as Clinton Tyree: Former Governor of Florida. After giving up faith in the political system he decides to live in the Everglades. He always wears a shower cap and an electronic tracking device he found on a wild Florida panther (leading to the appearance of the trackers at the climax). Skink saves Joe's life on more than one occasion and is instrumental at the ending of the book.
- Francis X. Kingsbury: The owner of the "Amazing Kingdom of Thrills" and a convicted felon, is a member of the Witness Protection Program after grassing on some mobsters in order to preserve himself.

== References to actual history, science, or current events ==
- Kingsbury conceived the "Mango Vole" scam as a way of competing with Walt Disney World's much-lauded (though ultimately unsuccessful) attempt to repopulate the now-extinct dusky seaside sparrow.
- The "Mango Voles" were actually cosmetically altered pine voles (Microtus pitymys); far from being endangered, as Kingsbury's accomplice tells him, they are classified as a species of least concern because of their abundance.
- Skink admits to secret dreams of breaking into Riker's Island prison in New York State and killing Mark David Chapman, the man who murdered John Lennon, the lead singer for The Beatles. Skink and Winder both discuss The Dakota hotel, the scene of Lennon's murder.
- Winder is saddened that Carrie, unlike him, cannot clearly remember the circumstances of Lennon's murder, and she defends that she was only fourteen years old when it happened, and, moreover, "it's easy to lose track of these idiots," naming other emotionally disturbed gunmen who have become famous, such as Lee Harvey Oswald, Sirhan Sirhan and John Hinckley;
- The Amazing Kingdom's nightly parade is based loosely on the history of Florida, making lighthearted, bloodless references to historical figures such as Juan Ponce de León, the pirate Black Caesar, and the Seminole chief Osceola, and events such as the Great Miami Hurricane of 1926. It also deliberately excludes mention of such episodes as the slaughter of French Huguenots at Fort Caroline in 1565 ("It would have been difficult to find a musical score suitable to accompany a mass disemboweling...")
- Several real-life pro golfers are named as contemporaries of Kingsbury's pro, Jake Harp, including Ben Hogan, Jack "The Bear" Nicklaus, Raymond Floyd, Arnold "Arnie" Palmer, Lee "The Mex" Trevino, Greg "The Shark" Norman, and Billy Casper.
- Kingsbury wears a variety of hairpieces to conceal his baldness, imitating the hairstyles of persons such as Kenny Rogers and Jack Kemp.

== Connections with Hiaasen's other works ==
- Skink and his best friend Jim Tile reappear after their introduction in Double Whammy.
- Hiaasen's book Team Rodent: How Disney Devours the World collects a series of essays castigating Walt Disney World, and the Disney Company in general, for their reality-distorting brand of entertainment and their corporate greed. The fictional "Amazing Kingdom" acts as a thinly veiled parody of Disney World, a theme park run by a fugitive ex-mobster whose sole motivation for providing family entertainment is that it is amazingly lucrative, and who will go to any lengths, including murder, to protect it.
- In Hiaasen's debut novel, Tourist Season, one of the civic leaders discussing Miami's response to a new eco-terrorist group operating in South Florida laments, "why doesn't this kind of shit ever happen to Disney World?" Hiaasen expands on this theme in Native Tongue, declaring that South Florida business and civic leaders blame Disney World for diverting the family tourist trade to Orlando, and greeted Kingsbury's proposal for a competitive theme park with instant, roaring approval.
- One of the most disgraceful floats in the Amazing Kingdom's nightly parade is entitled "Migrants on a Mission," portraying cheerful Caribbean farm workers dancing in Florida's sugar cane fields; Hiaasen's subsequent novel, Strip Tease, focuses on the sugar cane industry's exploitation of migrant labor, and the workers' squalid living conditions.
- Warren Zevon is named as one of Joe Winder's favorite rock musicians; Zevon was a long-time friend of Hiaasen, and the two collaborated on the lyrics for the song "Basket Case," which appeared in Hiaasen's subsequent novel of the same name and Zevon's 2002 album My Ride's Here.
