= Double Whammy (novel) =

1987 novel by Carl Hiaasen

- First edition
- Author: Carl Hiaasen
- Language: English
- Publisher: G.P. Putnam's Sons
- Publication date: 1987
- Publication place: United States
- Media type: Print (hardback & paperback)
- Preceded by: Tourist Season
- Followed by: Skin Tight

Double Whammy is a 1987 novel by Carl Hiaasen. The protagonist, a private investigator named R. J. Decker, is hired to expose a celebrity bass fisherman as a cheat and is drawn into a frame-up for murder. The book introduced the character of Clinton Tyree, aka Skink, who becomes a recurring character in subsequent Hiaasen novels.

== Explanation of the title ==
The "Double Whammy" is a freshwater fishing lure, supposedly the favorite of the celebrity angler. It is described as "the hottest lure on the pro bass circuit."

== Plot ==
Private investigator R. J. Decker is hired by sugarcane tycoon Dennis Gault to prove that Richard "Dickie" Lockhart, his rival in the professional bass fishing circuit, is a cheat. Decker, a disgraced newspaper photographer, looks up a former colleague, reporter Ott Pickney. Finding the local fishing guides too expensive, Decker takes Ott's advice and meets a reclusive hermit who calls himself Skink.

While teaching Decker about fishing, Skink mentions seeing Robert Clinch, a professional fisherman who recently died, out on Lake Jesup on the morning of his death; much to Decker's intrigue, Skink claims that Clinch wasn't fishing. Attending Clinch's funeral, Decker meets Gault's sister Elaine, known as Lanie, who confides to Decker that she and Clinch were lovers. She tells Decker that Gault hired Clinch to catch Lockhart first, believing Lockhart had Clinch murdered.

Ott is skeptical of Lanie's suspicions, since the coroner ruled Clinch's death an accident and fishing to be too outlandish a motive. However, when he interviews Clinch's widow, he also discovers clues that Clinch wasn't fishing. Finding the remains of Clinch's boat, Ott discovers signs of sabotage. Ott is murdered at that moment. After finding the body, Decker and Skink are both committed to nailing Lockhart. They tail him to his latest fishing tournament on Louisiana's Lake Maurepas, but inadvertently photograph the wrong gang of cheaters; Lockhart wins the tournament anyway.

Skink tries to raise Decker's spirits, adding, "Worse comes to worst, I'll just shoot the fucker." Later, Decker returns to find Lanie waiting in his hotel room. They have sex, and he drops her off at her hotel. Decker notices lights at the lakeside. He discovers Lockhart floating in the weigh tank, clubbed to death. Assuming Skink is the culprit, Decker drives back to Florida and is greeted by the Miami police, led by Detective Al Garcia. Skink intercepts Decker and tells him Gault's whole assignment was a setup, allowing Gault to kill his hated rival and put the blame on Decker.

The Outdoor Christian Network, led by televangelist Charlie Weeb, organizes a fishing tournament in Lockhart's memory to promote Weeb's housing development at the edge of the Everglades. Weeb is desperate to boost sales of the condominia, as his TV network is so financially dependent on the development that its failure will also ruin Weeb himself. He becomes even more desperate when the bass salted into the condo's lakes die, revealing that the land the development is built on is toxic. He orders his new spokesman, Eddie Spurling, to cheat by harvesting caged bass from the neighboring stretch of clean water in the Everglades.

While trying to flee Miami, Decker and Skink are stopped by Garcia, who has already found holes in Gault's frame-up story and realized Decker is innocent. Meanwhile, a worried Gault sends a hired thug, Thomas Curl, to kill Decker before Garcia finds him. While researching Lockhart's history, Decker and Skink learn of Weeb's development, and Skink resolves to stop it by sabotaging the fishing tournament. With the help of Skink's friend, State Trooper Jim Tile, Decker tracks down Lanie and forces her to confess her role in the conspiracy. Although her recorded statement is enough to clear Decker, Curl kidnaps his ex-wife Catherine and demands that Decker trade his life for hers. Decker tells Skink to go ahead with his plan to sabotage the tournament while he deals with Curl.

Skink's original plan is to have Garcia and Tile enter the tournament, posing as brothers, and win by catching Queenie, Skink's enormous pet bass. With publicity for Weeb's development aimed exclusively at white people, Skink predicts that having an African-American and a Cuban win the tournament will negatively affect Weeb's business. However, at the last moment, Skink changes his plan and arranges a "confrontation" between Queenie and Gault. He anonymously tips off Gault as to the location where he will plant Queenie, while sabotaging the motor of Garcia and Tile's boat. Decker rescues Catherine and kills Curl with a booby-trapped camera.

Predictably, the tournament is a fiasco: The latest batch of fish, sickened by the toxic water, refuse to eat, while Garcia and Tile are the only participants to catch one (tiny) bass. Spurling refuses to cheat, forcing Weeb to name them the winners and admit that the promised $250,000 grand prize is "not available." Garcia and Tile reveal their badges and arrest Weeb for fraud on live television. Skink sees all the bass floating to the surface and realizes that he has put Queenie in mortal danger by slipping her into the toxic water. Decker and Catherine join him on a boat borrowed from Spurling, and they speed to where he put her into the water.

They come upon Gault's boat, where Lanie is sitting alone and Gault's dead body is floating in the water. Gault had succeeded in hooking Queenie, but was unprepared for her weight and power, and so he tried to use his boat's engine to exhaust her. When she unexpectedly changed direction, Gault was unwilling to let her go and was pulled overboard into his own boat's propeller. Skink dives into the water, pulls a barely alive Queenie out, and leaps across a levee to put her back into the Everglades. Decker and Catherine, following onto the levee, cannot see either of them but are sure they hear the sound of both swimming to safety.

== Banning ==
- In 2017, the Texas Department of Corrections included Double Whammy on its list of banned books which inmates of the state prisons were not allowed to read. Hiaasen remarked that he was "flattered," although at a loss to understand how the book could spark a prisoner uprising.

== Connections with Hiaasen's other works ==
- Detective Al Garcia reappears, after his introduction in Tourist Season. A joking reference to his "victory" in the bass fishing tournament is made in the subsequent novel Skin Tight.
- Clinton Tyree, aka Skink, becomes a recurring character, along with FHP Trooper Jim Tile.
- Hiaasen's novels often feature a recurring joke that radiology is a "soft" medical discipline, and people who practice it are not "real" doctors. In this novel, the pathologist who conducts a hurried autopsy on Robert Clinch's body reflects internally that sometimes he wishes he had gone into radiology "like his dumb cousin."
- As governor, Tyree was disheartened to learn that his own running mate, the lieutenant governor, was a principal shareholder in a development company that acquired the wildlife preserve Tyree was trying to save. The lieutenant governor is not named, and does not appear, until Hiaasen's 2010 novel Star Island.

== Allusions to actual history, geography, or persons ==
- Decker's father was an FBI agent stationed in Dallas, Texas, when John F. Kennedy was assassinated. Decker's passion for photography was first kindled when he saw the Zapruder film as a young child.
- When Skink resigns from office, he purchases a bus ticket out of Tallahassee using the alias "Black Leclere," the name of one of the two main characters of Jack London's short story Bâtard.
- Several references are made to the largest largemouth bass ever caught, by George W. Perry in Georgia in 1932, which weighed 22 lb 4 oz. This record was unrivaled until 2009, when Japanese fisherman Manabu Kurita caught a bass of equal weight.
- When Skink and Decker are renting a small motorboat to stake out Dickie Lockhart at Lake Maurepas, Skink assuages the dockworker's suspicions by pretending to be Philippe Cousteau, the famous oceanographer. Cousteau died in a plane crash at age 38 in 1979, eight years before the novel's publication. His son, Philippe, Jr., born posthumously, was only seven years old at the time of publication.

== Adaptation ==
In May 2025, it was announced that Double Whammy was to receive a potential television adaptation titled R.J. Decker, with ABC ordering a pilot episode. In late June, Scott Speedman was cast as Decker. In September, a series was ordered for the 2026 midseason. The series debuted on March 3, 2026 and was renewed for a second season in May 2026.

== See also ==
- Roadkill cuisine
