= Stribling =

Stribling is a surname. Notable people with the surname include:

- Bill Stribling (1927–2006), American football end in the National Football League
- Channing Stribling (born 1994), American football player
- Cornelius Stribling (1796–1880), rear admiral in the United States Navy
- De'Zhaun Stribling (born 2002), American football player
- Melissa Stribling (1927–1992), Scottish film and television actress
- Michael Stribling (born 1951), American musician, best known for his series of New Age albums
- Robert Mackey Stribling (1833–1914), doctor, soldier and representative to the Virginia House of Delegates
- Thomas Sigismund Stribling (1881–1965), American writer and lawyer, published under the name T.S. Stribling
- Young Stribling (1904–1933), professional boxer in the Heavyweight division
- Joan Stribling Bafta Craft, RTS, D&AD, BBC (in house) Awards Freelance Film,TV, Stage Designer- Hair, Make-up & Prosthetics. Fine Artist & Choral Singer

== See also ==
- J. C. Stribling Barn, brick barn built c. 1890 to 1900 at 220 Isaqueena Trail in Clemson, South Carolina
- USS Stribling (DD-867), Gearing-class destroyer in the United States Navy
- USS Stribling (DD-96), Wickes-class destroyer in the United States Navy during World War I
- Stribog
- Stripling (disambiguation)
- Strobin
