= Bad Monkey =

Bad Monkey or Bad Monkeys may refer to:

- Bad Monkeys, 2007 American psychological thriller novel by Matt Ruff
- Bad Monkey (album), 2012 release by American bluesman Iron Mike Norton
- Bad Monkey (novel), 2013 American crime fiction satire by Carl Hiaasen
- Bad Monkey (TV series), 2024 American black comedy-drama based on Hiaasen's novel
