= Elizabeth Donald =

American writer (born 1975)

- Born: 1975 (age 50–51) Merced, California, U.S.
- Occupation: Author; journalist
- Education: Bryn Mawr School; Westview High School; University of Memphis; University of Tennessee at Martin; Southern Illinois University Edwardsville (MFA)
- Genres: Horror fiction; science fiction
- Notable awards: Darrell Award Mimi Zanger Award
- Spouse: Jim Gillentine (2014-present)
- Children: Ian Smith
- Parents: Ralph Donald; Patrice Stribling Nelson
- Relatives: Michael Stribling (uncle)

Website
- www.elizabethdonald.com

Elizabeth Donald (born 1975) is an American author and journalist, best known for writing horror and science fiction, including the Nocturnal Urges vampire mystery series and Blackfire zombie series.

== Life and career ==
Elizabeth Donald was born in Merced, California in 1975, the older of two children to Dr. Ralph Donald, a professor of mass communications retired from SIUE, and Patrice Stribling Nelson, a classical pianist. Donald attended Bryn Mawr School in Baltimore, Maryland and then Westview High School in Martin, Tennessee, graduating in 1993. She next attended the University of Memphis, initially studying theater, and then transferred to the University of Tennessee at Martin to study journalism, graduating with a bachelor's degree in mass communications. She later earned a masters degree in media studies and a Master of Fine Arts degree in creative writing from Southern Illinois University Edwardsville.

Her first novel, Nocturnal Urges, was published in 2004, launching the three-book vampire series. Since then, she has published many novels and novellas, as well as a number of short story publications in various magazines. She has won the Darrell Award for speculative fiction three times as well as the Mimi Zanger Award for fiction, and has been a finalist for other awards, including the Prism Award from Romance Writers of America, the Imadjinn Award, and the Knost Award. Her first screenplay was a finalist for the Imaginarium Film Festival Award.

She regularly appears at horror- and science fiction-themed conventions such as Archon, Dragoncon, MidSouthCon and Hypericon. In 2009, her novella titled "The Cold Ones" (Sam's Dot Publishing) sold out its first print run in 48 hours and launched the Blackfire series of novels and short stories. The protagonist of this novella was named after fellow author Sara M. Harvey.

She works as a freelance editor and writing coach, editing anthologies and novels for small-press publishers and working with beginning writers on fiction projects. In 2014, she launched a photography site, selling nature and art photography that has been licensed for book covers and other commercial purposes and has been featured in art shows and journals.

Elizabeth Donald was a full-time reporter at the Belleville News-Democrat newspaper in Illinois from 2000 until 2018. She has won multiple journalism awards, including the Southern Illinois Editorial Association and Illinois Press Association awards. She was vice president of the St. Louis Society of Professional Journalists for three years, and elected chapter president in 2015, and continues to serve. She has been a member of the national SPJ ethics commission since 2009, and was part of the team that rewrote the organization's code of ethics in 2014. In 2010, she was one of two initial recipients of the Terry Harper Memorial Fellowship from the national Society of Professional Journalists. She is a contributor to journalism trade magazines and guest lecturer on the subjects of journalism ethics and the changing nature of journalism in the 21st century.

Currently she teaches journalism, creative writing and English composition as an adjunct professor in the St. Louis region and has been active in advocacy for the First Amendment, both through her universities and as St. Louis SPJ president. She is a member of the Association of Writers and Writing Programs, the Authors Guild and other national writing and advocacy organizations, including the Sigma Tau Delta honor society, for which she served as a chapter president in 2022-23. She continues to work as a freelance journalist for multiple regional and national publications, including the St. Louis Labor Tribune and McClatchy.

Her uncle, Michael Stribling, is a new-age musician. She is married to author Jim Gillentine and has one son, Ian Smith, from a previous marriage. She is a lifelong member of the Episcopal Church and resides in Edwardsville, Illinois.

== Works ==
- Blackfire Rising, 2025 novel, Falstaff Books
- Yanaguana, October 2020, novella, appearing in the collection Foul Womb of Night by Crone Girls Press
- Moonlight Sonata, 2017 collection, Dark Oak Press
  - Finalist for Imadjinn Awards, 2018
- Nocturne Infernum, 2015 compendium of three novels, Seventh Star Press
- Gethsemane, 2014 novella, Aardvark Productions
- Dreadmire, 2013 novel, Inkstained Succubus Press
  - Re-released 2024 in an anniversary edition
- Infinity, 2011 novella, Aardvark Productions
- Blackfire, 2011, Sam's Dot Publishing
- The Cold Ones, 2009, Sam's Dot Publishing
- The Dreadmire Chronicles, 2009, Spellbinder Books
- Abaddon, 2007, novel, Cerridwen Press
  - Winner of the 2008 Darrell Award
- Nocturne, 2006 Cerridwen Press
- Tandem, 2006, ebook, Ellora's Cave Publishing
  - Also appears in "Sultry Summer Fun," a print anthology published in May 2007
- Setting Suns, 2006, anthology, New Babel Books
  - Winner of the 2007 Darrell Award for the story, "Wonderland"
  - Re-released in 2022 in an anniversary edition
- A More Perfect Union, 2005, novel, Ellora's Cave Publishing
  - Finalist for the 2006 Darrell Award
  - Rereleased in 2005 by Cerridwen Press
- Nocturnal Urges, 2004, novel, Ellora's Cave Publishing
  - Winner of the 2005 Darrell Award
  - Finalist for the 2004 Prism Award
  - Rereleased in 2005 by Cerridwen Press

Short works:

- “Fever,” short story, republished in ‘’Weird STL’’, February 2025
- “Not,” short story, published in the 2024 St. Louis Writers Guild anthology, January 2024
- “Azrael,” short story, published in parABnormal Magazine, December 2023
- “Tiny Monsters,” short story, published in River Bluff Review, April 2023
- “Seasons,” poem, published in River Bluff Review, April 2023
- “River’s End,” poem, published in River Bluff Review, April 2023
- “Fever,” short story, published in the literary magazine River Bluff Review, December 2021
- “The Train,” short story, winner of the Mimi Zanger Award for literary fiction.
- “Shiny People,” short story, published in the anthology Coppice and Brake by Crone Girls Press, March 2020
- “Sgt. Curious,” short story, published in the literary magazine River Bluff Review, March 2020
- “Dear Katrina,” short story, published in the literary magazine River Bluff Review, March 2020
- “In Memoriam,” short story, published in the anthology Stories We Tell After Midnight, October 2019
- “Weathergirl,” short story, published in the anthology Cover of Darkness, May 2009
- “Miracle Girl,” essay, published in the Belleville News-Democrat, March 2009.
- “Bargaining With Spiders,” short story, published in the anthology Twilight and Thorns, December 2007
- “Silent,” short story, published in the magazine Thirteen Stories, December 2003. Reprinted in Aoife’s Kiss Magazine, March 2007.
- “Muse City: I Live With It Every Day,” short story, co-written with Jason R. Tippitt, published by Distinctive Fiction, November 2003.
- “Jesus Loves Me,” short story, published in the e-zine The Murder Hole, March 2003
- “Blue Light Special,” essay, published in Panorama Magazine, November 2003.
- “Code Red,” essay, placed in the 2002 Writer’s Digest Writing Competition.
- “Vertigo,” short story, published in DogEar Magazine, September 2002.
- “The Modern Apprenticeship, Brought to You by Bill Gates,” essay, published in the New Jersey Special Review Assessment, 2002.
