= USS Stribling =

Two ships of the United States Navy have been named USS Stribling for Cornelius Stribling.

- The first USS Stribling (DD-96) was a Wickes-class destroyer, later redesignated DM-1.
- The second USS Stribling (DD-867) was a Gearing-class destroyer from 1945 to 1976.
