= Jaime Moyer =

American actress

Jaime Moyer is an American actress known for her appearances on Modern Family, A.P. Bio, K.C. Undercover, and Parks and Recreation; as well as voice work on Bob's Burgers and The Great North.

== Career ==
Jaime Moyer was born in Hamtramck, Michigan. She began her comedy career at The Second City in Chicago, where she wrote and starred in original sketch comedy; and at Planet Ant in Motor City, Detroit. In 2011, she won the Maestro prize at the Out of Bounds Comedy Festival in Austin, Texas. Moyer has regularly appeared as Guillermo’s wife on Jimmy Kimmel Live!. Moyer is an acting teacher and coach. She is still associated with Planet Ant.

Moyer has appeared on such television shows as Modern Family as Mrs. Pasternack, A.P. Bio as Joyce, and K.C. Undercover as Jodie Goldfeder. She has voiced characters on Bob's Burgers and The Great North. She also wrote for three seasons on Nickelodeon's Lego City Adventures. Moyer teaches improv and acting; and is co-founder of Go Comedy!

== Filmography ==
Year	Title:	Role:	Notes
2006	Offshore	Marge	
2007	The Planning Lady	Joanne Sanderson	Short
2016	Wingmen	Officer	Short
2017	Bitch	Plumber	
2010	The Night Is Young	Tara	
2019	Run Free	Groundskeeper	Short
2022	The Bob's Burgers Movie	Ticket Seller Lady (voice)	

== Television ==
Year	Title	Role	Notes
2009	Prayers for Bobby	Liz	TV movie
2011	Consequences	Barbara’s Mom	
2013	Parks and Recreation	Roz Degrandis	
2014	Bonnie Blake: Parole Officer	Kneecap Nancy	5 episodes
2013	Jennifer Falls	Doreen	2 episodes
2015	2 Broke Girls	Carmen	
2016	Last Will and Testicle	Ovarian Cancer	
2016	Game Shakers	Brenda	
2015–2016	K.C. Undercover	Jodie Goldfeder	6 episodes
2016	F’d	Shiela	
2017	Detroiters	Bartender	
2018	Nicky, Ricky, Dicky & Dawn	Mrs. Monet	
2018	Oishi: Demon Hunter	Mahjong Lady / Diamond	3 episodes
2018	Badge of a Quitter	Mall Cop	
2019	Future Man	Clamp Barrowmaker	2 episodes
2010	Bootstrapped	Businesswoman	
2016–2019	Modern Family	Mrs. Pasternack	4 episodes
2019	Will & Grace	Janae	
2019–2020	Bob's Burgers	Colleen / April (voice)	2 episodes
2020	The Big Show Show	Miss Riggi	3 episodes
2019–2021	A.P. Bio	Joyce	8 episodes
2019–2021	Lego City Adventures	Writer	38 episodes
2022	Bob Hearts Abishola	Mel	
2023	Night Court	Linda	2 episodes
2025	Mid-Century Modern	Marilou	
2021–2025	The Great North	Jennifer / Titanic Baby	5 episodes
2025	Super Duper Bunny League	Auntie Freeze	2 episodes

== Podcast ==
Year	Title	Role	Notes
2018	Hello from the Magic Tavern	Glorbia	
2019	The Neighborhood Listen	Miss L (voice)	
2023	How to Destroy Everything	Support Group	
2025	The Novelizers		
