= Skin Tight (novel) =

1989 novel by Carl Hiaasen

- First edition
- Author: Carl Hiaasen
- Language: English
- Publisher: Putnam
- Publication date: September 1989
- Publication place: United States
- Media type: Print (hardback & paperback)
- Pages: 319 pp
- ISBN: 978-0-399-13489-0
- OCLC: 19511900
- Dewey Decimal: 813/.54 20
- LC Class: PS3558.I217 S57 1989
- Preceded by: Double Whammy
- Followed by: Native Tongue

Skin Tight is a novel by Carl Hiaasen. It focuses on a former detective for the Florida State Attorney's office, who becomes the target of a murder plot by a corrupt plastic surgeon.

== Plot summary ==
Dr. Rudy Graveline, is the director of the Whispering Palms Surgery Center which is in the book a well-known surgery center in Bal Harbour, Florida. But the story shows that he has never been trained or certified in cosmetic surgery. He has built his reputation through social connections and by taking credit for the work of his associates. On the few occasions when Rudy himself performs surgery, the book indicates that something goes wrong. So far in the story, he has weathered malpractice complaints and investigations by the state through bribery and intimidation.

Rudy learns from his former nurse, Maggie Gonzalez, that a private investigator named Mick Stranahan is investigating the disappearance of college student Victoria Barletta, who Rudy accidentally killed during a botched nose job. Rudy decides to have Mick killed. In reality, Maggie has turned whistleblower and is planning to tell her story on the sensationalist talk show In Your Face!, pointing to Mick to misdirect Rudy. The intended hit on Mick fails when he ambushes the hit man and impales him with the sword of a stuffed marlin head.

Reynaldo Flemm, the host of In Your Face!, and his producer, Christina Marks, come to Miami looking for Maggie. Rudy approaches a disfigured felon named Blondell Wayne Tatum ("Chemo"), who agrees to kill Mick in exchange for a discount on his dermabrasion treatments. After Chemo tracks down Mick's vengeful ex-wife, Chloe, she eagerly guides him to Mick's house in Stiltsville. However, when Chloe realizes that Chemo means to kill Mick as opposed to scaring him, the ensuing argument ends with Chemo drowning her. Chemo burns down an abandoned stilt house, assuming it is Mick's because of Chloe's incorrect directions.

The next day, Detective Al Garcia and Marine Patrol Officer Luis Cordova inform Mick that he is the prime suspect in Chloe's murder. When Mick tells them that someone is trying to kill him, they advise him to lie low. Instead, Mick confronts Rudy outside his clinic and warns him to desist, emphasizing his point by blowing up the doctor's Jaguar. Mick is visited by Christina, who had interviewed his old partner, Timmy Gavigan, and been told a detail from the Barletta case: Rudy's brother, George, is a tree trimmer. Mick deduces from this that a woodchipper was used to dispose of Barletta's body.

Chemo attacks Mick's house with a submachine gun. After a shootout, he finds himself in the ocean and loses his hand to a Great Barracuda, opting to attach a portable weed whacker to the stump instead of a conventional prosthesis. Rudy has Chemo travel to New York City to eliminate Maggie. However, when she tells him about Rudy's past, Chemo is mortified that he has entrusted his face to such a fraud and decides to help her blackmail Rudy with the knowledge about Barletta's death. Maggie has shot a videotaped confession for security, but Mick and Christina obtain a copy.

Returning to Miami, Mick delivers the video to Al before surviving another murder attempt, this time by a pair of corrupt detectives hired by a crooked county commissioner tied to Rudy. Yet again, Mick outfoxes them and lures them into a fatal booby trap. Mick turns up the heat on Rudy by recruiting his brother-in-law, a personal injury lawyer named Kipper Garth, to sue him yet again for malpractice. He then confronts George, who tries to kill Mick and is shot dead by Al. Chemo and Maggie kidnap Christina, holding her hostage in exchange for Mick's copy of the video.

Reynaldo tries to crack the case himself by scheduling a nose job and abdominoplasty with Rudy, planning to conduct an ambush interview once the operation is done. The scheme fails when Rudy conducts the abdominoplasty first and puts Reynaldo under general anesthesia. When a cameraman bursts into the operating room to start the interview, Rudy panics and accidentally stabs Reynaldo through the heart with a liposuction cannula. With George dead and no option left but to flee the country, Rudy returns home to find that his girlfriend, actress Heather Chappell, has been kidnapped by Mick. Realizing they will never get paid until Mick is no longer a threat to Rudy, Chemo and Maggie join him to confront Mick at his house, taking Christina with them.

During the confrontation, Mick knocks out Chemo and Rudy, and sends Christina, Maggie and Heather back to the mainland. Mick then attempts to "jog" Rudy's memory of Barletta's death by "recreating" the circumstances of the botched nose job, with Rudy as the "patient." Scared, Rudy admits he accidentally killed Barletta, then got George to get rid of the body. He also confesses to hiring Chemo to kill Mick; Chemo is so alarmed at Mick learning his motive for taking the job that he kills Rudy. Mick ties up Chemo, calls the police and swims away. Al arrives and Chemo is arrested.

Chemo is convicted of murdering Chloe and Rudy and is sentenced to 17 years in prison. Maggie is convicted of perjury and obstruction of justice and is killed in a riot at the Dade County Stockade. Reynaldo's body is sent to a medical school on Guadeloupe to serve as a clinical teaching aid, while In Your Face! is cancelled following his disappearance. Barletta's parents receive a suitcase full of money, supposedly a gift from Rudy's estate. Christina takes a newspaper job in Miami and purchases a second-hand fishing boat.

== Connections with Hiaasen's other works ==
- Al Garcia, who has appeared in Tourist Season and Double Whammy, makes his third appearance. Luis Cordova makes a joking reference to Garcia's "victory" in a bass fishing tournament in the latter novel.
- A passing reference is made to Mick Stranahan in Stormy Weather, when Clinton Tyree, aka "Skink," camps on Mick's old stilt house, which has been abandoned since the former occupant "married a beautiful twelve-string guitarist and moved to the island of Exuma."
- Mick Stranahan, Luis Cordova, and Kipper Garth all re-appear in Hiaasen's 2004 novel, Skinny Dip. Christina Marks does not appear, as Mick tells the female protagonist of that novel that she married, and later divorced, him.
- Chemo reappears in Hiaasen's 2010 novel, Star Island.
- Hiaasen's novels often feature a recurring joke that radiology is a "soft" medical discipline, and those that practice it are not "real" doctors; Rudy not only finished dead last in his medical school class, but he "barely squeaked through a residency in radiology" before deciding to specialize in cosmetic surgery "for the simple reason that it was exceedingly lucrative."

== Allusions to actual history, geography, or persons ==
- In his foreword, Hiaasen gives thanks to a plastic surgeon, who supplied him with technical details. At the time this novel was written, Hiaasen was still married to his first wife, Connie, who was employed as a surgical nurse.
- Reynaldo Flemm is a parody of Geraldo Rivera.
- There are several parallels between Rudy Graveline and Reinaldo Silvestre, a fake plastic surgeon operating in Miami Beach who was exposed in 1999; like Graveline, Silvestre had no qualifications as a cosmetic surgeon (or any medical qualifications at all), yet managed to convince many patients of his skills through social interaction; despite repeated grisly mistakes, his victims were often too embarrassed to admit the cause of their disfiguring injuries, while new patients - swept up by the culture of Miami Beach - never bothered to investigate Silvestre's qualifications or review any of the malpractice complaints against him.

== Reception ==
The New York Times Book Review highlighted the book's "taut, fast-paced action" and noted the author' dark, biting tone towards Florida corrupt system. Several other book critics or literary commentators point to the book dark, satirical aspect and laud the book's high-energy entertainment value.
