= Stripling =

Stripling may refer to:

== People ==
- Byron Stripling (born 1961), trumpet player, vocalist, & bandleader
- Jon Stripling, bass player
- Kathryn Stripling Byer (1944–2017), author
- Randy Stripling, actor
- Robert E. Stripling (died 1991), American civil servant
- Ross Stripling (born 1989), professional baseball player
- Sidney Stripling (died 1940s), musician
- The Stripling Brothers, Charlie (1896–1966) and Ira (1898–1967), American country musicians

== Schools and companies ==
- Stripling & Cox, department store
- Stripling Middle School, Fort Worth, Texas

== Other uses ==
- Landing Stripling, Tom and Jerry cartoon
- A character in the 2013 Carl Hiaasen novel Bad Monkey
