= Detroiters =

TV series

- Genre: Sitcom
- Created by: Sam Richardson; Tim Robinson; Zach Kanin; Joe Kelly
- Starring: Sam Richardson; Tim Robinson
- Country of origin: United States
- Original language: English
- No. of seasons: 2
- No. of episodes: 20

Production
- Executive producers: Sam Richardson; Tim Robinson; Zach Kanin; Joe Kelly; Lorne Michaels; Jason Sudeikis
- Running time: 22 minutes
- Production companies: Broadway Video; Central Productions

Original release
- Network: Comedy Central
- Release: February 7, 2017 – August 16, 2018

Detroiters is an American sitcom created by Sam Richardson, Tim Robinson, Zach Kanin, and Joe Kelly. The series, filmed on location in Detroit, starred native Michiganders Richardson and Robinson. The series premiered on Comedy Central on February 7, 2017 and ran for two seasons. On December 11, 2018, Comedy Central canceled the series.

Best friends and next-door neighbors Sam Duvet (Richardson) and Tim Cramblin (Robinson) work together as creatives at Tim's family's advertising agency in Detroit (which Tim took over after his father stepped down), producing low-budget TV commercials for local businesses.

== Cast ==
=== Main ===
- Sam Richardson as Sam Duvet
- Tim Robinson as Tim Cramblin

=== Recurring ===
- Shawntay Dalon as Chrissy Cramblin, Tim's wife and Sam's sister; she works on an automotive assembly line
- Pat Vern Harris as Sheila Portnadi, the secretary at Cramblin Advertising
- Lailani Ledesma as Lea, an intern at Cramblin Advertising
- Andre Belue as Tommy Pencils, an employee at Cramblin Advertising
- Quintin Hicks as Quintin the Bartender
- Chris Powell as Ned, a security guard for the building in which Cramblin Advertising is located
- Carolette Phillips as Rhonda Devereux
- Jason Sudeikis as Carter Grant, a Chrysler executive
- Amber Ruffin as Molly
- Mort Crim as himself
- Obba Babatundé as Mr. Duvet

=== Guest stars ===
- Kevin Nash as "Big Hank" Cramblin, Cramblin-Duvet's former CEO and Tim's father, who was committed to a mental hospital before the show's events.
- Chris Redd as Doughnut Perkins, a stand-up comedian whose routine relies heavily on Tim being in the audience.
- Keegan-Michael Key as Smilin' Jack
- Cecily Strong as Roz Chunks "The Mom Attorney", a client of Cramblin-Duvet's whose son is a compulsive masturbator.
- Michael Che
- Marc Evan Jackson as Dr. Kozak
- Larry Joe Campbell as Chuck
- Richard Karn as himself
- Malcolm-Jamal Warner as Sebastian
- Rick Mahorn as himself
- Jim Harbaugh as himself
- Steve Higgins as Eddie Champagne
- Tim Meadows as Walt Worsch
- George Wallace as Freddie "Motown" Brown
- Wendy Raquel Robinson as Councilwoman Gwinett
- Conner O'Malley as Trevor, Tim's brother
- Faizon Love as Farmer Zack
- Trick Trick as Cash for Copper Carl
- Danny Brown as Dr. Mayflower
- Mary Lynn Rajskub as Margaret
- Anthony Adams as Uncle George, Sam's Uncle

== Episodes ==
| Season | Episodes | Originally released | |
| Season | Episodes | First released | Last released |
|---|---|---|---|
| 1 | 10 | February 7, 2017 | April 11, 2017 |
| 2 | 10 | June 21, 2018 | August 16, 2018 |

=== Season 1 (2017) ===
| No. overall | No. in season | Title | Directed by | Written by | Original release date | Prod. code | US viewers (millions) |
|---|---|---|---|---|---|---|---|
| 1 | 1 | "Pilot" | John Solomon | Zach Kanin, Joe Kelly, Sam Richardson & Tim Robinson | February 7, 2017 | 101 | 0.447 |
Best friends Sam and Tim work on an advertising pitch for Chrysler, but they run into problems with the company's vice president of marketing, Carter Grant.
| 2 | 2 | "Hog Riders" | Nick Jasenovec | Comedian CP & Chip Hall | February 14, 2017 | 106 | 0.388 |
An adventuresome client inspires Sam and Tim to ditch the office and cruise around on their newly purchased motorcycle.
| 3 | 3 | "Sam the Man" | Oz Rodriguez | Sam Richardson | February 21, 2017 | 104 | 0.366 |
Sam tries to date again, but is confused for a prostitute. He develops feelings for his client and realizes the prostitution life is not for him.
| 4 | 4 | "Devereux Wigs" | Bill Benz | Zach Kanin | February 28, 2017 | 102 | 0.368 |
An old Motown legend is approached to perform a jingle for a local wig company ad that Tim and Sam are producing, which forces Tim to come to terms with his own singing skills.
| 5 | 5 | "Happy Birthday Mr. Duvet" | Becky Martin | Amber Ruffin | March 7, 2017 | 107 | 0.288 |
Its Mr. Duvet's 60th birthday. That means everyone has to deliver a speech. Sam isn't worrying, as he spent the last year preparing a speech centered around jokes about his dad's mustache. That is until Sam's dad arrives without a mustache, leaving Sam without a plan. Tim meets a real clown at the party, and is disappointed when he doesn't live up to his expectations.
| 6 | 6 | "3rd Floor" | Bill Benz | Zach Kanin | March 14, 2017 | 103 | 0.426 |
A new tech company moves into Tim and Sam's building, disrupting their daily flow. Sam lies to Tim about his plans after developing a crush on one of the women from the new company.
| 7 | 7 | "Smilin' Jack" | Nick Jasenovec | Tim Robinson | March 21, 2017 | 105 | 0.336 |
After getting fired by a furniture store client, Tim and Sam try to make an ad for the store's main competitor, who struggles on camera. Guest starring Keegan-Michael Key.
| 8 | 8 | "Dream Cruise" | Becky Martin | Michael Che | March 28, 2017 | 108 | 0.355 |
Sam and Tim go onto local television to promote their "De2roit" shirts with Lea and Tommy singing the jingle, but Tommy gets stage fright causing Lea to injure her ankle. Because Sam and Tim think "insurance is for suckers" they have to go to all of their clients that owe them money to try to pay Lea's medical bill, or she'll quit.
| 9 | 9 | "Husky Boys" | Nick Jasenovec | Joe Kelly | April 4, 2017 | 109 | 0.341 |
Big Hank makes a triumphant return, with Tim and Sam having to learn how to take a back seat to a creative genius.
| 10 | 10 | "Quick Rick Mahorn in Dearborn" | Oz Rodriguez | Joe Kelly | April 11, 2017 | 110 | 0.345 |
Tim and Sam run into Carter Grant from Chrysler at an Advertising Award Ceremony and are racked with guilt after seeing what happened to him after they hit him with a car. Meanwhile, Rick Mahorn overhears Sam and Tim talk about his poor acting skills and decides to do something about it.

=== Season 2 (2018) ===
| No. overall | No. in season | Title | Directed by | Written by | Original release date | Prod. code | US viewers (millions) |
|---|---|---|---|---|---|---|---|
| 11 | 1 | "April in the D" | Andrew Gaynord | Zach Kanin | June 21, 2018 | 201 | 0.264 |
After a celebratory dinner, Sheila gets a DUI. In searching for her lawyer, Sam and Tim find an 'April in the D' video of one of the lawyers and decide they could also get the lawyer as a client. Meanwhile, Cramblin-Duvet is on a hot streak and a rival offers to buy them.
| 12 | 2 | "Jefferson Porger" | Stephanie Laing | Joe Kelly | June 21, 2018 | 206 | 0.233 |
Tim becomes jealous after Sam has success acting in a commercial, and tries to replicate the results, which does not go how he would have hoped.
| 13 | 3 | "Duvet Family Reunion" | Stephanie Laing | Amber Ruffin | June 28, 2018 | 202 | 0.247 |
Sam brings his new girlfriend to the Family Reunion and Tim is nonplussed to say the least. Sam deals with feeling inadequate to his dad.
| 14 | 4 | "Trevor" | Dale Stern | Tim Robinson | July 5, 2018 | 204 | 0.314 |
Tim's mother asks if he can get his brother, Trevor, a job at the agency, where he turns out to be a natural. Trevor also moves in with Tim and Chrissy, where Tim and Trevor start fighting and pranking. This forces Chrissy to find solace at Sam's house where their sibling rivalry turns into a mutual enjoyment of a dance show.
| 15 | 5 | "Farmer Zack" | Alex Buono | Amber Ruffin | July 12, 2018 | 203 | 0.254 |
After hearing an old commercial jingle that Sam sang with his ex-girlfriend, Sam decides it needs an update with his new girlfriend singing. Everyone agrees that the new version is less sexy and not fun like the original. Sam is forced to reach out to his ex-girlfriend to ask her to re-record the new jingle. Meanwhile, Chrissy is recording YouTube tutorials at home and Tim finds out that the comments section roasts him, causing Tim to spiral.
| 16 | 6 | "Mort Crim" | Dale Stern | Comedian CP & Chip Hall | July 19, 2018 | 205 | 0.255 |
The guys court legendary newscaster Mort Crim to be the celebrity spokesperson for one of their clients. After a break-in, Ned ramps up security in the building.
| 17 | 7 | "Lois" | Dale Stern | Sam Richardson | July 26, 2018 | 207 | 0.316 |
Sam starts speaking differently to try and impress his new girlfriend. Tim gets roped into spending time with a widower. Chrissy has trouble hitting it off with a new coworker.
| 18 | 8 | "Hark Motors" | Andrew Gaynord | Zach Kanin | August 2, 2018 | 208 | 0.274 |
Sam and Tim decide to play dirty after Doner starts stealing their clients, but get more than they bargain for with an eccentric auto company owner.
| 19 | 9 | "Little Caesars" | Dale Stern | Joe Kelly | August 9, 2018 | 209 | 0.279 |
After a fortuitous accident at a fundraiser, Sam and Tim find themselves reeling in a big fish of a client: Little Caesars.
| 20 | 10 | "Royals" | Alex Buono | Leila Strachan | August 16, 2018 | 210 | 0.239 |
The future of Cramblin Duvet is in jeopardy when Sam discovers that he might be a father.

== Production ==
=== Development ===
Robinson and Richardson, both raised in Michigan, performed improv comedy together first at Hamtramck's Planet Ant Theatre, and later at Chicago's Second City. They became close friends and conceptualized the idea of Detroiters. In an interview with the Metro Times, Robinson stated that they sought to depict Detroit as it really is and to avoid the overtly negative light in which the city is typically shown.

Lorne Michaels' Broadway Video produced the show, and Jason Sudeikis, Joe Kelly, and Zach Kanin were executive producers. Robinson and Richardson also wrote for the show.

=== Cast and filming ===
Detroiters was shot on-location in Detroit; filming locations included Doner Advertising, Belle Isle, Hamtramck, the Detroit Institute of Arts, and the headquarters of Little Caesars. Many of the commercials shown throughout the series are based on actual spots that showed in the 1990s in the area.

The show hired over 200 people from Detroit, including cast members Lailani Ledesma, Christopher Powell, and Shawntay Dalon. The theme song was written by local artist and shoe entrepreneur Rick Williams.

=== Release ===
Season 1 of Detroiters premiered on February 7, 2017, on Comedy Central. The show was renewed and season 2 premiered on June 21, 2018.

=== Cancellation ===
On December 11, 2018, it was announced that Comedy Central had chosen not to pick up the show for a third season. Along with the announcement, Richardson tweeted, "Maybe it will find a home elsewhere, who knows?" Comedian Seth Meyers wrote an op-ed for Vulture where he advocated for another network to pick up the show.

== Broadcast ==
Internationally, the series premiered in Australia on The Comedy Channel on February 13, 2017.

In September 2024, it was announced that both seasons of Detroiters would begin streaming on Netflix in the United States starting October 15. The show did not appear on the platform until the following day, October 16, after Netflix gave no explanation for the delay.

== Reception ==
Detroiters received positive reviews from television critics. On Rotten Tomatoes, the first season holds an approval rating of 90%, based on 20 reviews, with an average rating of 7.1/10. The site's critical consensus reads, "Proudly stupid yet surprisingly soulful, Detroiters showcases an impressive level of commitment from its charming, well-matched leads – and balances its goofy humor with an equal helping of heart." On Metacritic, the first season holds a score of 75 out of 100, based on 11 critics, indicating "generally favorable reviews".

On Rotten Tomatoes, the second season received a 100% approval rating based on 10 reviews with an average rating of 9/10. The site's critical consensus reads, "Sam Richardson and Tim Robinson's pair of lovable dimwits continue to delight in an even better sophomore season that dishes out more foiled dreams with an infectious dose of heart."
