= All Def Comedy =

- Created by: Russell Simmons
- Directed by: Stan Lathan
- Country of origin: United States
- Original language: English
- No. of seasons: 1
- No. of episodes: 7 + special

Production
- Executive producers: Russell Simmons; Stan Lathan; Chris Conti; Jeru Tillman
- Running time: 57 minutes (special); 30 minutes (series)

Original release
- Network: HBO
- Release: November 12, 2016
- Release: December 1 – December 29, 2017

Related
- Def Comedy Jam

All Def Comedy is an American stand-up comedy television series on HBO created by Russell Simmons. It is the successor to his Def Comedy Jam series which aired for eight seasons spanning 1992 to 1997 and 2006 to 2008.

A television special Russell Simmons Presents All Def Comedy aired on November 12, 2016, leading to a six-episode season that premiered on December 1, 2017 and concluded on December 29, 2017. The series was hosted by Tony Rock.

== Episodes ==
No.	Original air date	US viewers (millions)
Special	November 12, 2016	0.396
Special	Chris Powell, Zainab Johnson, Kevin Tate, Robert S. Powell III, Tony T. Roberts	0.396
1	December 1, 2017	TBA
1	Clayton Thomas, Jordan Rock, Robert S. Powell III, Gary Owen	TBA
2	December 8, 2017	TBA
2	Sydney Castillo, Leonard Ouzts, Just Nesh, DeRay Davis	TBA
3	December 15, 2017	TBA
3	Alex Babbitt, Daphnique Springs, Nate Jackson, D'Lai	TBA
4	December 22, 2017	TBA
4	Na'im Lynn, Ryan Davis, Kelly Kellz, Mark Viera.	TBA
5	December 29, 2017	TBA
5	Kareem Green, Jess Hilarious, Henry Coleman, JJ Williamson	TBA
6	December 29, 2017	TBA
6	Karlous Miller, Teddy Ray, Tony Baker, Deon Cole	TBA

== See also ==
- All Def Digital, also known as All Def, the digital media company Simmons founded in 2013
