= Chris Powell (comedian) =

American actor, writer, and comedian

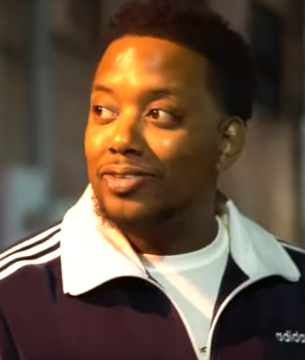
- Powell in 2017
- Born: Christopher Powell; March 19, 1983 (age 43); Detroit, Michigan, U.S.
- Other name: CP
- Education: Michigan State University
- Occupations: Actor, comedian
- Years active: 2010—present
- Known for: Detroiters, Love Life

Christopher Powell, also known as Comedian CP, (born March 19, 1983) is an American actor, writer, and comedian. He appeared on Empire, Detroiters, All Def Comedy, and season two of HBO Max's Love Life.

== Life and career ==
Powell was born and raised in Detroit, Michigan. He attended Mumford High School and received his bachelor's degree in communication studies from Michigan State University. In college he joined the fraternity Kappa Alpha Psi.

Powell worked in advertising before leaving in 2010 to pursue a career in the entertainment industry. His monthly comedy show at Saint Andrew's Hall, "The CP Show", helped him gain wider prominence, in addition to posting comedic videos online.

In 2015, Powell booked his first television role in a recurring role as Lil Prince on Empire. Powell was also selected to perform stand-up on HBO's All Def Comedy (2016). For two years, he was a cast member and writer on the Comedy Central series Detroiters (2017-2018). He was also a writer for Black Jesus.

Powell acted in a supporting role on season two of the HBO Max series Love Life (2021).

== Personal life ==
Powell is married and has daughters.
