= Westview High School (Tennessee) =

Coordinates: 36.30231°N 88.84636°W

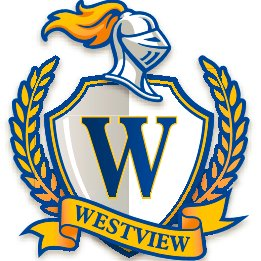

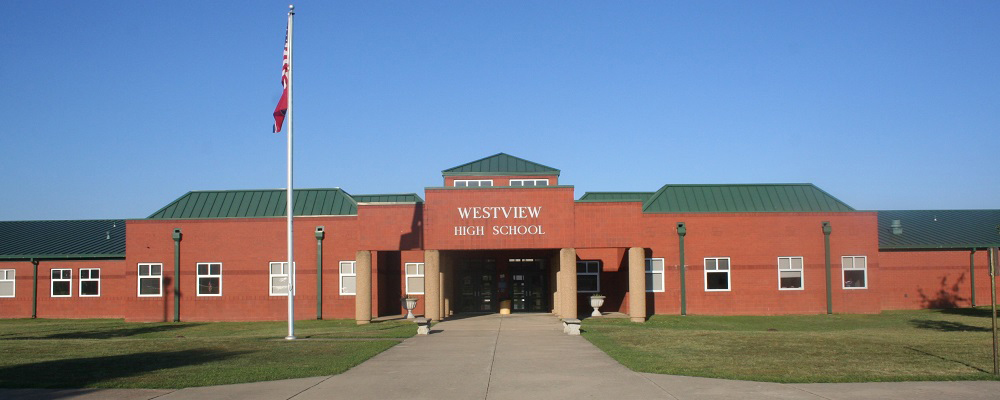

Location
- 8161 Highway 45, Martin, TN 38237; United States

Information
- Former name: Martin High School
- Type: Public High School
- Established: 1925
- School district: Weakley County Schools
- Principal: Brian Allen
- Assistant Principal: Delana Smith
- Staff: 48.83 (FTE)
- Grades: 9-12
- Enrollment: 560 (2022-2023)
- Student to teacher ratio: 11.47
- Colors: Royal Blue, Yellow Gold
- Website: https://whs.weakleyschools.com/

Westview High School is a public high school in Martin, Tennessee, United States. It is part of the Weakley County school district. As of 2022, it has an enrollment of approximately 544 students. The current principal is Brian Allen.

== History ==
Martin High School was established in 1925. The mascot was originally the Panthers until Fall 1970 when Martin High School was renamed Westview High School and the mascot was changed to the Chargers. In Fall 1971, the school moved into a newly constructed building. In Fall 1982, Sharon High School branched off from Westview High School, but was later re-consolidated in 1991.

== Notable alumni ==
- Chad Clifton, NFL football player for the Green Bay Packers
- Elizabeth Donald, author
- Justin Harrell, NFL football player for the Green Bay Packers
- Crystal Renee Hayslett - Actress and costume designer, known for BET's Sistas and BET+'s Zatima
- Ty Simpson (2022), quarterback for the Los Angeles Rams
