= Bad Monkey (album) =

Studio album by Iron Mike Norton
- Released: May 7, 2013
- Studio: The Gutbuckit
- Genre: Blues, blues rock
- Length: 30:33
- Label: GFO
- Producer: Iron Mike Norton

Iron Mike Norton chronology
Bad Monkey (2013)	Bloody Knuckles (2013)

Bad Monkey is an album released by American blues artist Iron Mike Norton. It was released May 7, 2012, on GFO Records and distributed by INgrooves. It is considered the cornerstone album for Norton, establishing his signature "swamp stomp" style of blues.

== Production ==
Bad Monkey was recorded at The Gutbuckit in Gainesville, Missouri, and produced by Iron Mike Norton.

The song"Whiskey And Wine (live)" was recorded live at Simple Man's in Mountain Home, Arkansas.

== Track listing ==
All tracks are written by Iron Mike Norton except track 10, written by John Newton.

No.	Title	Length
1.	"Shake My Tree"	3:03
2.	"Jethro Dean Is A Love Machine"	2:53
3.	"Red Light Blues"	3:05
4.	"Heartbeat Canon"	3:19
5.	"The Earl Of Hooker"	2:52
6.	"Whiskey And Wine (live)"	3:27
7.	"Got'dem Moves"	2:43
8.	"Come To Me"	4:00
9.	"S.O.B."	3:04
10.	"Amazing Grace"	2:17

== Personnel ==
=== Musicians ===
Iron Mike Norton – Slide guitar (all tracks), Guitar (all tracks except 6), Dobro (track 10), vocals (all tracks), Bass guitar (tracks 4 & 8). Drums (all tracks), Roland TR-808 (tracks 1, 3, and 7)

=== Production ===
Iron Mike Norton – producer, mixing engineer
