= Blondell Wayne Tatum =

Fictional character by Carl Hiaasen

Blondell Wayne Tatum, a.k.a. Chemo, is a fictional character who has appeared in two novels by Carl Hiaasen, Skin Tight (1989) and Star Island (2010).

== Personal history ==
Tatum was born in North Dakota. His parents belonged to a religious sect that believed in polygamy, vegetarianism, and refusing to pay income taxes. Tatum was orphaned at age six when his parents were killed in a shootout with FBI agents in a post office outside Grand Forks. He went to live with his aunt and uncle, who were fugitives from felony mail fraud charges in New Jersey, masquerading as Amish wheat farmers in rural Pennsylvania. Blondell first turned to crime when he was sixteen (holding up a bank with a pitchfork), eventually becoming a corrupt, though popular, city official in a small Pennsylvania town.

His life took a drastic turn due to a freak accident during an electrolysis procedure to remove two ingrown hair follicles from the tip of his nose. While Tatum was unconscious, the doctor suffered a stroke and mistakenly applied the needle to his entire face. After Tatum woke up, he killed the doctor and fled the city, trying to find a cure for his facial condition. One wrongly-prescribed medication produced a lasting effect which "looked as if someone had glued Rice Krispies to every square centimeter of his face" and led to his nickname, "Chemo" (since many people wrongly assumed he was undergoing chemotherapy).

In Bal Harbour, Florida, he approaches Dr. Rudy Graveline, a plastic surgeon who offers him a discount on dermabrasion treatments in exchange for Chemo killing Mick Stranahan, a former State Investigator who is causing Rudy worry.

During his first, failed attempt, Chemo drowns Stranahan's vengeful ex-wife, Chloe, with an anchor, after she points out the house she thinks is his. During his second, Chemo dives off the balcony of Stranahan's stilt house in Biscayne Bay, and his hand is bitten off by a strike from Stranahan's pet Great Barracuda. Instead of a conventional prosthesis, he chooses to attach a portable weed whacker.

The whole affair spirals out of control, though Chemo is able to steal an amount of cash from Graveline that allows him to undergo a complete facial dermabrasion from a competent plastic surgeon. Although this treatment succeeds in removing the "Rice Krispies" effect, his surgeon advises him that he will still have to regrow the outer layer of his facial skin.

Eventually, Chemo is caught in a confrontation between Graveline and Stranahan out on the stilt house, where he kills Graveline out of fear (or mortification) that Graveline is about to confess the terms of the "deal" that he and Graveline had for killing Stranahan. Chemo is later arrested, and sentenced to four concurrent seventeen-year life sentences at Raiford.

In 2010, he is back in Florida, having been paroled after 17 years, and enjoyed a lucrative spell of employment as a mortgage loan broker. After the subprime mortgage bubble bursts, he is back to doing security, sometimes as a bodyguard for visiting celebrities. He carves out a small specialty for himself as a life coach for those with self-destructive addictions, since he has no awe whatsoever of fame, is immune to seduction, and not at all averse to beating his charges to pulp if they misbehave themselves. After pop star "Cherry Pye's" latest drug-and-alcohol escapade, her record promoter recruits Chemo to be her latest bodyguard, over the objections of her family.

== Appearance ==
Aside from his facial condition (which never completely recovers after the electrolysis mishap) and the weed trimmer attached to his arm, Chemo's appearance is also frightening because of his pallid, almost-reptilian complexion, the sparse hair on his scalp, and the fact that he stands 6'9" tall.

== Books with Chemo ==
- Skin Tight
- Star Island
