= Bloody Knuckles (album) =

Studio album by Iron Mike Norton
- Released: June 4, 2013
- Studio: The Gutbuckit
- Genre: Blues, blues rock, Southern rock, swamp rock
- Length: 33:01
- Label: GFO
- Producer: Iron Mike Norton

Iron Mike Norton chronology
Bad Monkey (2012)	Bloody Knuckles (2013)	Box Fulla Bones (2015)

Bloody Knuckles is an album released by American blues rock artist Iron Mike Norton. It was released June 4, 2013, on GFO Records and distributed by INgrooves.

== Production ==
Bloody Knuckles was recorded at The Gutbuckit in Gainesville, Missouri, and produced by Iron Mike Norton.

== Track listing ==
All tracks are written by Iron Mike Norton

No.	Title	Length
1.	"War Horse"	3:30
2.	"Killer Bee"	3:26
3.	"Jess B, Frends"	3:32
4.	"Roses And Rust"	4:14
5.	"Strawberry Crush"	3:03
6.	"Black Tooth Grin"	1:51
7.	"49 Dog tear"	3:49
8.	"Get Close"	3:08
9.	"El Legarto"	2:55
10.	"Calhoun County"	3:43

== Personnel ==
=== Musicians ===
Iron Mike Norton – Slide guitar (all tracks except 8), Guitar (all tracks), vocals (all tracks), Bass guitar (tracks 4 & 7). Drums (all tracks), Roland TR-808 (tracks 2, 8)

=== Production ===
Iron Mike Norton – producer, mixing engineer
