= Bad Monkey (TV series) =

2024 American black comedy television series

- Genre: Black comedy; Crime drama
- Based on: Bad Monkey by Carl Hiaasen
- Developed by: Bill Lawrence
- Starring: Vince Vaughn; L. Scott Caldwell; Rob Delaney; Meredith Hagner; Natalie Martinez; Alex Moffat; Michelle Monaghan; Ronald Peet; Jodie Turner-Smith; John Malkovich; John Ortiz; Charlotte Lawrence; Yvonne Strahovski
- Music by: Waz & Jamie Jackson
- Country of origin: United States
- Original language: English
- No. of seasons: 1
- No. of episodes: 10

Production
- Executive producers: Bill Lawrence; Jeff Ingold; Matt Tarses; Marcos Siega; Vince Vaughn; Liza Katzer
- Producers: Stephanie Johnson; Jean Higgins
- Cinematography: John Brawley; Michael Watson
- Editors: Les Butler; Perri Frank; Evan J. Warner
- Running time: 39–57 minutes
- Production companies: Doozer Productions; Warner Bros. Television

Original release
- Network: Apple TV+
- Release: August 14 – October 9, 2024
- Network: Apple TV

Bad Monkey is an American black comedy crime drama television series developed and executive produced by Bill Lawrence. A co-production between Warner Bros. Television, Two Soups Productions and Doozer Productions, it is based on the 2013 novel of the same name by Carl Hiaasen.

The series is led by Vince Vaughn, L. Scott Caldwell, Rob Delaney, Meredith Hagner, Natalie Martinez, Alex Moffat, Michelle Monaghan, Ronald Peet, and Jodie Turner-Smith. Bad Monkey premiered on August 14, 2024, on Apple TV+.

In December 2024, the series was renewed for a second season, which is slated to premiere on December 2, 2026.

== Premise ==
Andrew Yancy is a former police detective who has been reduced to conducting restaurant inspections in South Florida. A severed arm found by a tourist pulls Yancy into a world of greed and corruption that decimates the land and environment in both Florida and the Bahamas.

== Cast ==
=== Main ===
- Vince Vaughn as Andrew Yancy, a one-time detective turned restaurant inspector
- L. Scott Caldwell as Ya-Ya, Dragon Queen's grandmother
- Rob Delaney as Nick Stripling, Eve's husband and "Christopher", Eve's boyfriend after a fake drowning
- Meredith Hagner as Eve Stripling, the wife of fake drowning victim Nick Stripling (season 1)
- Natalie Martinez as Rosalba "Rosa" Campesino, a medical examiner from Miami who helps Andrew Yancy, and becomes his lover
- Alex Moffat as Evan Shook, a real estate developer designing a mansion next to Yancy's property
- Michelle Monaghan as Bonnie Witt / Plover Chase, a woman in an abusive marriage with a secret past
- Ronald Peet as Neville Stafford, a young Bahamian fisherman
- Jodie Turner-Smith as Dragon Queen / Gracie (season 1), an Obeah–practicing woman living in Andros, Bahamas
- John Malkovich as Spencer (season 2)
- John Ortiz (Note: For the first season, Ortiz is credited as "Special Guest Star" but is a recurring cast member.) as Rogelio (season 2; recurring season 1), a police detective and Yancy's best friend
- Charlotte Lawrence as Caitlin (season 2; recurring season 1), a model, recovering addict, and Eve's stepdaughter
- Yvonne Strahovski as Delaney (season 2)

=== Recurring ===
- Todd Allen Durkin as Sheriff Sonny Summers, a witless local cop and boss of Yancy
- Nina Grollman as Madeline, a naive young woman, former girlfriend to Charles Phinney
- Tom Nowicki as Captain Fitzpatrick / Narrator
- Lauren Buglioli as Heather, a popular meteorologist in Miami, known for her "Heather with the Weather" segment
- Victor Turpin as Montenegro, Rogelio's husband, Yancy's lawyer and close friend
- David St. Louis as Egg, a native of Andros, muscle for Nick Stripling
- Gizel Jiménez as Mel Campesino, Rosa's sister, later known as "Hurricane Mel"
- Reese Antoinette as Dawnie, Neville's ex-girlfriend
- Ashley Nicole Black as Johnna Russell, an agent with the Oklahoma State Bureau, pursuing Bonnie
- Gonzalo Menendez as Mendez, a corrupt cop in Miami
- Scott Glenn as Jim Yancy, Andrew Yancy's father
- Bob Clendenin as K.J. Claspers, a pilot who works for the Striplings
- Alex MacNicoll as Cody, a former student of Bonnie's with whom she had a sexual relationship
- Arian Cartaya as Sam O'Peele
- Sam Jaeger (season 2)
- Nate Jackson (season 2)
- Brent Morin (season 2)
- Peter Billingsley (season 2)
- June Diane Raphael (season 2)
- Keyla Monterroso Mejia (season 2)
- Mo Amer (season 2)
- Dax Shepard (season 2)

In addition, Crystal the Monkey co-stars as Driggs.

=== Guest ===
- Zach Braff as Israel "Izzy" O'Peele, Nick's best friend and business partner

== Episodes ==
=== Series overview ===
Season	Episodes	Originally released		
Season	Episodes	First released	Last released	Network
1	10	August 14, 2024	October 2, 2024	Apple TV+
2	10	December 2, 2026	February 3, 2027	Apple TV

=== Season 1 (2024) ===
No. overall	No. in season	Title	Directed by	Written by	Original release date	Prod. code
1	1	"The Floating-Human-Body-Parts Capital of America"	Marcos Siega	Teleplay by : Bill Lawrence	August 14, 2024	T82.10301
A severed arm is discovered by a fishing boat off the coast of the Florida Keys. Ex-detective Andrew Yancy, suspended for having assaulted the husband of his lover, is tasked to deliver the arm to the Miami morgue. The arm is identified by Dr. Rosa Campesino as having belonged to Nick Stripling and is returned to his wife Eve. Eve's step-daughter Caitlin believes she killed her father for his money. At a bar, Yancy witnesses Charles Phinney, the first mate of the boat where the arm was found, being shot dead. On Andros Island, resident Neville Stafford consults with the local Obeah, Gracie, known as the "Dragon Queen", to put a curse on the developers seeking to replace his home with a resort. Christopher, the man developing the resort, is revealed to have been the one who shot Phinney.
2	2	"A Hundred Bucks Says You Won't"	Erica Dunton	Adam Sztykiel & Ellie Knaus	August 14, 2024	T82.10302
Much to his chagrin, Yancy is given a new job as a restaurant inspector. A conversation with Caitlin leads Yancy to investigate Eve's home alongside an equally suspicious Rosa where the two discover bone fragments in the shower drain. After having his home demolished, Neville, believing that Gracie's curse has failed, leaves the island to see his half-sister. Yancy learns that his lover Bonnie is actually a fugitive from Oklahoma; having fled after having sex with one of her underage students. Gracie confides to her grandmother, Ya-Ya, that the situation between Neville and Christopher will soon drag many people in.
3	3	"Nobody Said He Was Alvin Einstein"	Erica Dunton	Matt Tarses	August 21, 2024	T82.10303
Yancy and Rosa interrogate Phinney's girlfriend Madeline, learning that her boyfriend was paid to reel the arm in. Investigating Nick's former workplace, the two visit Dr. Israel O'Peele, who explains his time working with Nick to scam Medicare. Yancy later returns to Israel's apartment only to find the latter dead from a gunshot. Neville returns to Andros and confronts Gracie for her curse failing before parting with his monkey Driggs as a show of faith. Neville then steals a USB drive containing info on the resort project. Caitlin confronts Eve, accusing her of murdering her father only to be stopped by Christopher, who is revealed to actually be a one-armed Nick.
4	4	"Nothing's Wrong With It, I Just Don't Need It Anymore"	Marcos Siega	Annie Mebane	August 28, 2024	T82.10304
Flashbacks reveal how Nick and Eve first met. When the FBI caught wind of his Medicare scam, Nick faked his death by willingly having Israel amputate his arm and bribing Phinney into "reeling" it in. When Phinney and Israel risked exposing the deception, Nick, under orders from Eve, had them killed. Additionally, it is explained how Yancy lost his detective job in Miami in an attempt to expose the corrupt Officer Mendez, and how he met Bonnie and the reasons for assaulting her husband. In the present, Mendez, now a detective, learns from Israel's neighbor that she witnessed Yancy leaving her neighbor's apartment the day he was killed. Meanwhile, Yancy, after realizing that Nick possibly faked his death, is knocked unconscious by Nick himself.
5	5	"That Damn Arm Is Back"	Marcos Siega	Brian C Brown	September 4, 2024	T82.10305
After surviving his attempted murder, Yancy recovers Nick's misplaced cell phone. Yancy and Rosa learn that Yancy is now a wanted suspect for Israel's murder, forcing them to hide out with Rosa's family. Neville attempts to hand the USB drive to city hall, but is betrayed. Having been cut off from her funds by her husband, Bonnie returns to Key West where she encounters Cody, the student she slept with. After digging up Nick's arm, Yancy takes one of the fingers, and manages to unlock Nick's phone. He and Rosa deduce which airport the Striplings will be flying out of. Despite failing to catch them as the plane takes off, Yancy calls Eve, revealing that Nick failed to kill him.
6	6	"Yo, Would You Tell Ms. Chase I Still Love Her Like Crazy"	Liz Friedlander	Milla Bell-Hart	September 11, 2024	T82.10306
Returning home from the airstrip to find Bonnie and Cody, Yancy sends them to his father's place for them to lie low. He then meets up with his partner Rogelio to discuss things only to discover that Ro set him up to be arrested by a vengeful Mendez. While investigating the hangar for proof of Yancy's innocence, Rosa finds Neville in the Striplings' plane, having stowed away to escape the wrath of the Striplings' bodyguard Egg. Feeling guilty for betraying his friend, Ro interrogates Israel's neighbor, learning that Mendez had ordered her to leave out the fact that she had also witnessed Nick at her apartment the day the doctor was killed, exonerating Yancy. After threatening the Striplings when they make her a worthless offer for land she had inherited, Gracie is abducted by an unknown figure.
7	7	"A Total Cat Person"	Liz Friedlander	Ashley Nicole Black	September 18, 2024	T82.10307
Flashbacks explain how Gracie became the "Dragon Queen". In the present, the Striplings are revealed to have abducted Gracie. Eve points out how they are both willing to do whatever it takes to get what they want, convincing Gracie to take the Striplings' offer. Ya-Ya learns that the land was never legally signed over to Gracie. Confronting her granddaughter, the latter tearfully admits that she does not believe in her magic and leaves. After providing the sheriff with evidence provided by Neville regarding the Striplings, Yancy earns his detective job back but is told that the FBI are not extraditing Nick any time soon. After being given a speech by Yancy, Bonnie is arrested and extradited back to Oklahoma.
8	8	"The Russian Mob Is Very Active in Key West"	Colin Bucksey	Michael C. Martin	September 25, 2024	T82.10308
Despite her arrest, Bonnie is released after Cody's parents drop the charges against her. Returning to Florida, she burns down a spec home next to Yancy's place in order to be arrested for arson. Yancy and Rosa hatch a plan with Caitlin to get Nick and Eve back on US soil by having Rosa pose as a buyer for some resort property. As Yancy and Rosa toast their success with Neville and his girlfriend Dawnie, the Striplings visit the bar Yancy and Rosa went to earlier that day where they find a photo of them with their pilot, Claspers.
9	9	"You Really Don't Want to Kill This Scrumptious Little Puppy"	Sam Jones	Matt Tarses	October 2, 2024	T82.10309
Eve invites Rosa over under the guise of discussing business before revealing that she saw the incriminating photo, leading to her being held hostage by Egg. Gracie tells Yancy and Neville about Rosa's situation, leading Yancy to head off to the Striplings' mansion. He is instead confronted by Nick who tries to shoot him. As Yancy tries to remind Nick about Caitlin, Neville sneaks up from behind and stabs Nick in the back with a fishing rod. Rosa escapes by shooting Egg in the leg, and reunites with Yancy and Neville, who informs the two that they need to get off the island. Despite Rosa's pleas for him to leave with her, Yancy stays behind to see things through. While trying to find help for Nick, Eve runs into Gracie. Having reembraced her Dragon Queen persona after some soul-searching, Gracie viciously warns Eve that she will get what's coming to her.
10	10	"We're in the Memory-Making Business"	Colin Bucksey	Bill Lawrence & Matt Tarses	October 9, 2024	T82.10310
Despite her threats, Gracie is killed after Eve impales her on a fallen tree branch. Having been left paralyzed due to his injuries, Nick, no longer of use to Eve, is dumped from a wheel chair into the canal by her where he drowns. As Eve is making her getaway in her yacht, Yancy dives in and grabs hold of the rope but ultimately decides to let her go. Nick's body is recovered by Neville, who pickpockets Nick's watch in order to sell it for money to rebuild his home. While hiding in Portugal, Eve falls to her death after choking on a carrot. After receiving a final call from Bonnie, who escaped prison, Yancy and Rosa agree to end things so Rosa can find herself. Ya-Ya returns Driggs to Neville and begins training Dawnie's younger sister Lulu to become the next queen. Despite wanting to settle down for a while, Yancy becomes intrigued when Rogelio approaches him about something in his car.

=== Season 2 ===
No. overall	No. in season	Title	Directed by	Written by	Original release date	Prod. code
11	1	"You Can't Save All the Turtles"	David Dobkin	Adam Sztykiel	December 2, 2026	TBA
12	2	"Andrew Yancy, Animal Vigilante"	David Dobkin	Milla Bell-Hart	December 9, 2026	TBA
13	3	TBA	TBA	Ellie Knaus	December 16, 2026	TBA
14	4	TBA	TBA	Michael C. Martin	December 23, 2026	TBA
15	5	TBA	TBA	Chris Downey	December 30, 2026	TBA
16	6	TBA	TBA	Brian C. Brown	January 6, 2027	TBA
17	7	TBA	TBA	TBA	January 13, 2027	TBA
18	8	TBA	TBA	Allison Bosma & Jon DeWalt	January 20, 2027	TBA

== Production ==
In December 2018, Bill Lawrence's Doozer Productions signed an eight-figure five-year overall deal with Warner Bros. Television. In August 2021, the two studios announced the development of Bad Monkey, a 10-episode drama series based on the 2013 novel of the same name by Carl Hiaasen, with Vince Vaughn starring and Apple TV+ distributing. In December 2021, Michelle Monaghan, Jodie Turner-Smith, and Meredith Hagner joined the cast. In January 2022, Ana Villafañe, Rob Delaney, Ahmed Elhaj, Arturo Luis Soria, and Alex Moffat were added to the cast. In March 2022, Natalie Martinez was cast as a series regular to replace Villafañe because, according to Deadline Hollywood, "the character had been written older than Villafañe's age, leading to the decision to replace her." In April, L. Scott Caldwell and Charlotte Lawrence were reported to star, with Ronald Peet taking over Elhaj's role. In June, it was announced John Ortiz had been cast to replace Soria in the series.

Filming began in February 2022, in the Florida Keys and Miami, Florida. Filming locations included Blue Springs in Orange City and Duval Street, Key West. In December 2024, Apple TV+ renewed the series for a second season, with production moving from Florida Keys and Miami to Los Angeles. In August 2025, John Malkovich was cast as a series regular for the second season. In September 2025, Ortiz was promoted as a series regular while Yvonne Strahovski joined the cast as a new series regular for the second season. In October 2025, Sam Jaeger and Nate Jackson were cast in recurring capacities, Martinez was announced to return as a series regular and Charlotte Lawrence was promoted to a series regular for the second season. In November 2025, Brent Morin, Peter Billingsley, and June Diane Raphael joined the cast in recurring roles for the second season. In January 2026, Keyla Monterroso Mejia and Mo Amer were cast in recurring capacities for the second season.

=== Stalking Incident ===
During production in February of 2026, Lamar Roman, a Monroe County Sheriff's Office deputy working to provide security for the set and crew, began stalking one of the actresses. He accessed the DAVID and MNI databases to retrieve information about his target. Lamar used the information collected in the automated license plate reader system to track his victim, later perform a traffic stop on her. Roman was charged with three counts of the misuse of the systems and fired from the sheriff's office. In a negotiated deferred prosecution package, he was assigned therapy, ordered not to contact the victim, and community service.

== Release ==
Bad Monkey premiered on August 14, 2024, on Apple TV+, with the first two episodes available immediately and the rest debuting on a weekly basis until October 9, 2024. The second season is set to premiere on December 2, 2026.

== Reception ==
The review aggregator website Rotten Tomatoes reported a 93% approval rating with an average rating of 7.1/10, based on 70 critic reviews. The website's critics consensus reads, "A vibrant riff on the P.I. serials of television's yesteryear, Bad Monkey is a breezy good time that fully leverages Vince Vaughn's motormouth charms." Metacritic, which uses a weighted average, assigned a score of 74 out of 100 based on 32 critics, indicating "generally favorable reviews".
