= Hypericon =

Speculative fiction convention

- Status: Defunct
- Genre: Multi-Genre
- Venue: Marriott Nashville Airport
- Locations: Nashville, Tennessee
- Country: United States
- Inaugurated: 2005
- Organizer: Frontiers Nashville
- Filing status: Non-profit
- Website: http://hypericon.net

Hypericon was a speculative fiction convention held yearly in June in Nashville, Tennessee. Hypericon was presented by Frontiers Nashville, a non-profit organization dedicated to the support of the fannish community and their myriad of interests, and partnered with Make Nashville, a local maker space and producer of the Nashville Mini Maker Faire. The event also supported the Nashville Public Library Foundation as a featured charity in 2017.

Some convention activities included a "premium" consuite, luau, cosplay contest with a $500 prize, role-playing games, live action roleplaying, filmmaking panels, a room party competition, art show, dealers' room, artist and exhibit tables, screening room, "old-school" arcade, maker room, and 24-hour gaming room.

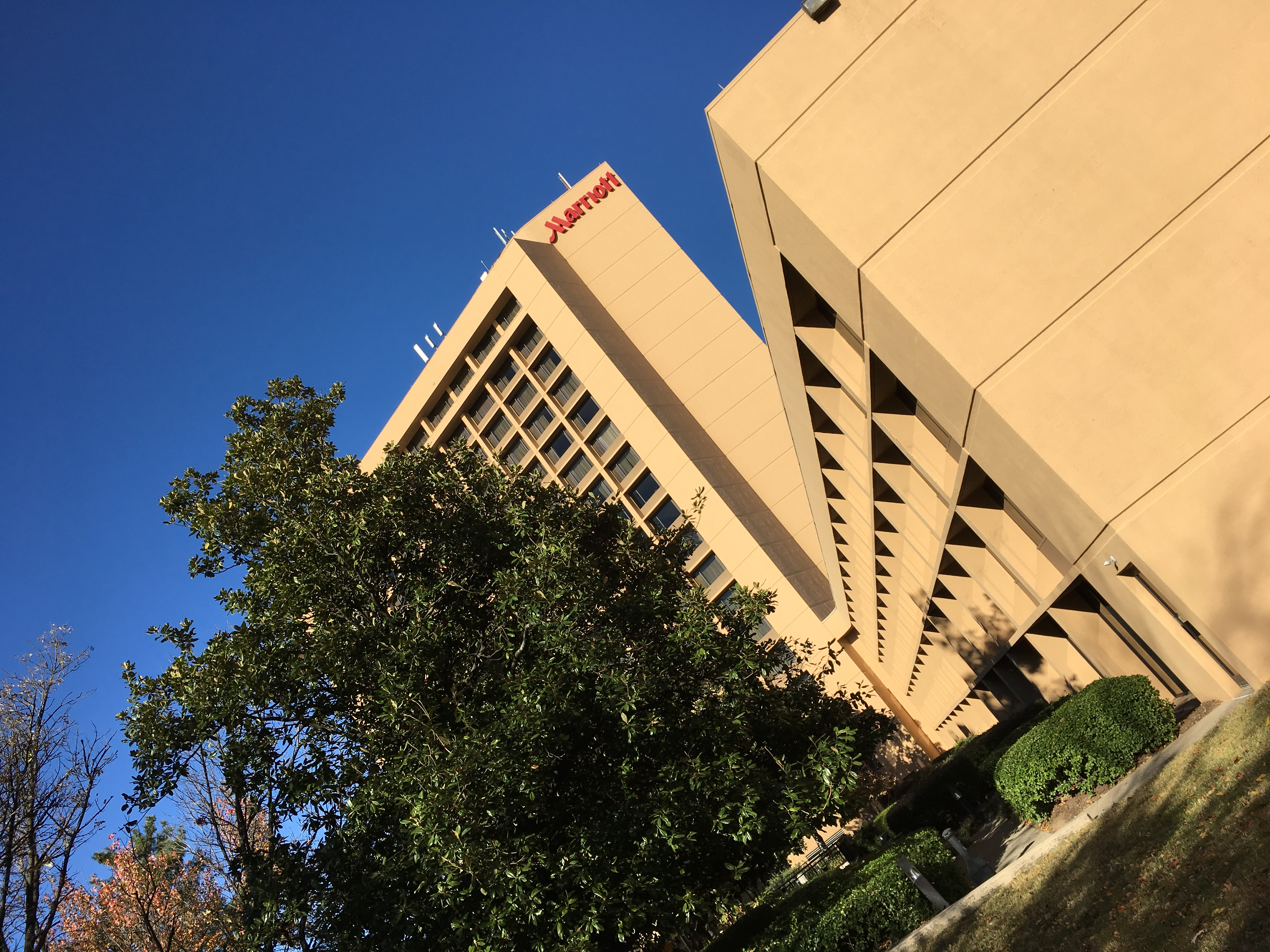
Hypericon's new home as of 2017 - the Nashville Marriott Airport.

Through 2010, Hypericon was held at the Days Inn Stadium in Nashville. Starting in 2011, the convention moved to the Holiday Inn Express Nashville Airport, near Nashville International Airport.

== Past Conventions ==
Hypericon 1 was held June 17–19, 2005. Guests of Honor was Tom Piccirilli, Hunter Cressall, Amy H. Sturgis, Melissa Gay, and Todd Lyles. Fan Guests of Honor were the Known World Players.

Hypericon 2 was held June 23–25, 2006. Guest of Honor was Tim Powers. Special guests included Sherrilyn Kenyon, Brian Keene, Glen Cook, and John Skipp.

Hypericon 3 was held June 15–17, 2007. Guest of Honor was Scott Nicholson. Artist Guests of Honor were Michael Bielaczyc and Paul Bielaczyc. Special guests were Sherrilyn Kenyon and Glen Cook. Fan Guests of Honor were Frank and Millie Kalisz

Hypericon 4 was held June 27–29, 2008. Literary Guest of Honor was Joe R. Lansdale. Artist Guest of Honor was Alex McVey. Additional guests included Sherrilyn Kenyon, Glen Cook, Geoffrey Girard, Bryan Smith, Elizabeth Donald, Sara M. Harvey, P.S. Gifford, and more.

Hypericon 5 was held June 5–7, 2009, and served as the host to DeepSouthCon 47. Author GoH was Brian Keene, Artist GoH was Steven Gilberts, Fan GoH was Bob Embler, Filk GoH was Kathy mar and Special Guests were Jonathan Mayberry and Glen Cook.

Hypericon 6 was held June 4–6, 2010, and included Ramsey Campbell, Sherrilyn Kenyon, Glen Cook, and The Great Luke Ski among its honored guests.

Hypericon 7 was held June 17–19, 2011, at the Holiday Inn Express Airport, and included author Glen Cook and artist Loren Damewood as guests of honor.

The convention took a hiatus in 2012.

Hypericon 8 was held June 14–16, 2013, at the Holiday Inn Express Airport, and included author Robin Hobb as guest of honor.

Hypericon 9 was held June 13–15, 2014, at the Holiday Inn Express Airport. Guests of honor were writer Jack Ketchum, artist Sam Flegal, author/costumer Sara M. Harvey, author Glen Cook, and author/filmmaker/small press guy Stephen Zimmer. Other guests included H. David Blalock, Jackie Gamber, Maruice Broaddus, Melissa Gay, Jimmy Gillentine, Herika Raymer, Loren Damewood, and Angelia Sparrow.

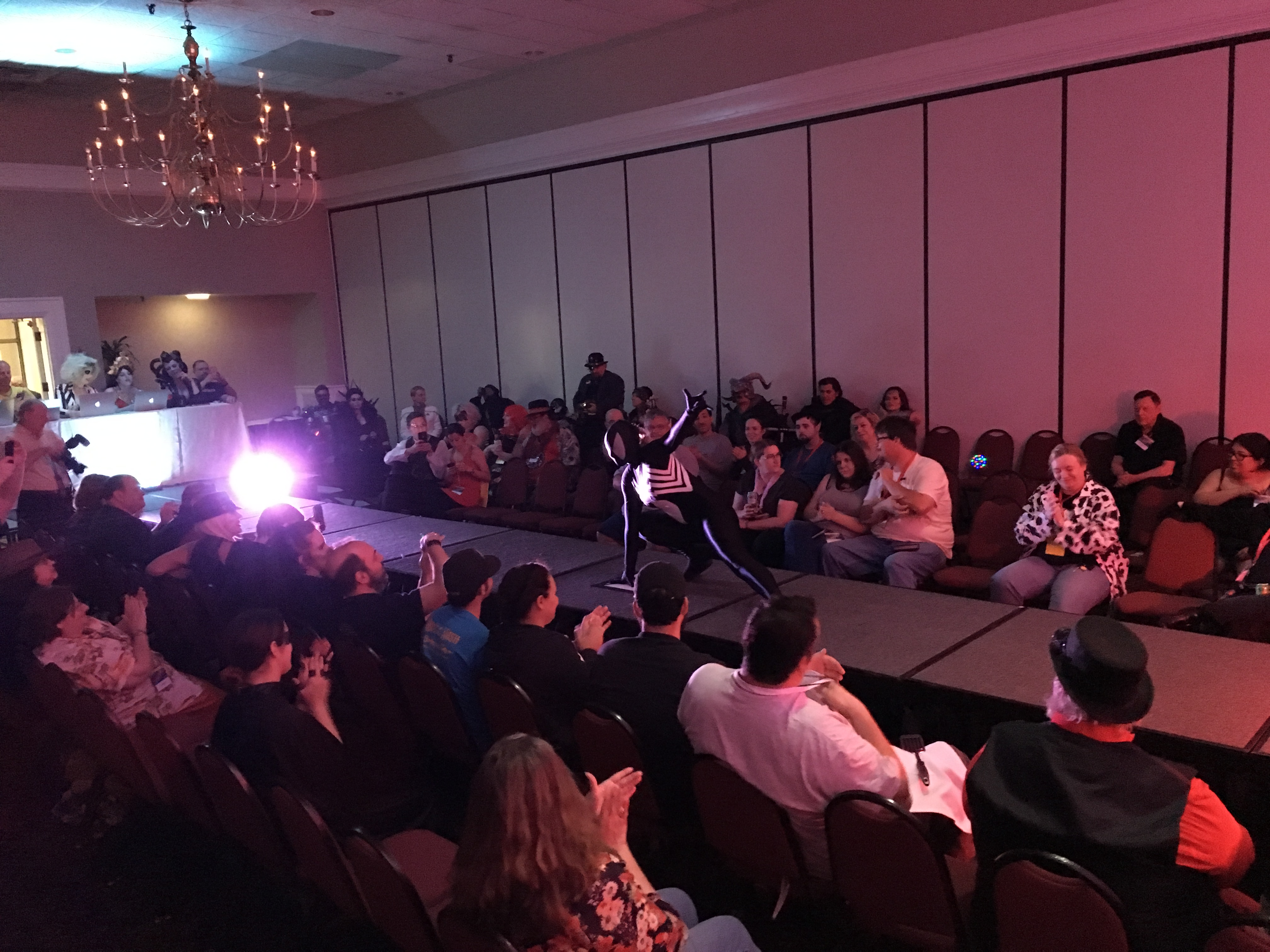
The Hypericon 11 Cosplay, with runway.

Hypericon 10 was held June 19–21, 2015, at the Holiday Inn Express Airport. Guests included writer Gabriel Bethir, artist Ethan Black, author H. David Blalock, Costume designer and hobbyist Kristen M Collins, Young Adult Novelist D. G. Driver and Author and RPG enthusiast Jonathan French. Other guests include Glen Cook, Dan Gamber, Jackie Gamber, Melissa Gay, Jimmy Gillentine, Eric Jamborsky, Mark Kinney, Brick Marlin, Robert Midgett, Van Allen Plexico, Betsy Phillips, Angelia Sparrow, Dennis R. Upkins, Stephen Zimmer, and others.

Hypericon 11 was held June 17–19, 2016, at the Millennium Maxwell House Hotel. Guests of honor included author Stephen Zimmer, artist Mitch Foust, actor Santiago Cirilo, cosplayer Gogo Incognito, filmmaker and special-effects makeup artist Rick Prince, steampunk crafter James Neathery, and Master of Ceremonies Big Daddy Cool, Johnny Delarocca. Other guests included Michael Bielaczyc, Elonka Dunin, Melissa Gay, Cosplay, Inc., Infinite Dreams Gaming, D.G. Driver, Glen Cook, Cosplay Collective, Tommy Hancock, Michelle Nickel, Loren Damewood, Louise Herring-Jones, Van Allen Plexico, Conquest Gaming, and Bryan Stancliff

Hypericon 12 was held June 16–18, 2017, at the Marriott Nashville Airport. Guests of Honor included Bob Hepner, game designer Robert Schwalb, and Master of Ceremonies Big Daddy Cool, Johnny Delarocca. Other guests include author Leonardo Ramirez, drag performer Venus Ann Serena, and performance troupe The Bombshell Kittens.

== The "Next-Gen" Era ==
Beginning with Hypericon 11, organizers engaged in a modernization effort for the convention (internally deemed "Hypericon Next-Gen"), adopting new branding and a larger scope of content, guests, and fandom. Attendance doubled in the single year between 2015 and 2016. Upon the cancelation of another local multi-genre convention, Geek Media Expo (GMX), interest in the market began shifting to Hypericon.

== Infinity Membership ==
In 2017, the convention began offering its take on a lifetime badge - the "Infinity Membership." This membership class, launched at a price of $300, served as an ongoing and permanent registration for its holder, but was also transferable for a fraction of its original cost, an infinite number of times. The badge was metal and laser-etched, with a leather lanyard, and retained by the registrant for automatic entry into the event each year. The cost would have increased over time as the convention planned to grow, and there were intended to be multiple VIP benefits associated with the Infinity Membership.

As part of this higher level of commitment for attendees, the Infinity League launched as a fan investment opportunity, offering supporters one of six slots in an "elite" group that invested $1000 each for one year in the convention. They received a complimentary Infinity Membership in return for their generosity and instead of interest.

== Social Missions ==
The event was billed as an opportunity for "enrichment through geekery," promotion of literacy through the "geek arts," supporting local maker culture, connecting creators to those aspiring to their craft, and connecting support for the local library's new media and "geeky" offerings. Another core value of the convention was to offer more substantial food in their consuite than many other events, to help offset attendance costs for fans in the community.
