= Zach Kanin =

American cartoonist

- Born: Zachary Kanin; September 20, 1983 (age 43); Washington, D.C., U.S.
- Occupations: Cartoonist, writer, producer
- Years active: 2002–Present
- Notable work: Detroiters; I Think You Should Leave with Tim Robinson
- Children: 3

Zachary Joshua Kanin (born September 20, 1983) is an American writer, producer, and cartoonist. He is a former SNL staff writer and the co-creator, producer, and writer of Detroiters and I Think You Should Leave with Tim Robinson.

== Early life and education ==
Kanin was born in Washington, D.C. to Dennis R. Kanin and Carol Kanin, and was raised in Newton, Massachusetts. His maternal grandfather is former Rhode Island governor Frank Licht. Kanin began drawing as early as preschool. He attended The Roxbury Latin School in West Roxbury, MA before matriculating to Harvard University. At Harvard, he received his degree in English. He joined The Harvard Lampoon in 2002 and later became president.

== Career ==
Kanin worked as an assistant to The New Yorker's cartoons editor, Robert Mankoff for two years after college. Eventually, Kanin began to submit his own work for publication. He has published approximately 300 cartoons in The New Yorker as of 2014. The style of his cartoons was described by Richard Gehr of The Comics Journal as "a slightly surreal place where things have gone sometimes seriously awry."

Kanin was hired to the writing staff of SNL in 2011 and left in 2016. While working there he met fellow writer Tim Robinson and the two became writing partners. They collaborated to create Detroiters (2017–2018), I Think You Should Leave with Tim Robinson (2019–), and The Chair Company (2025–). He was also a writer for Documentary Now!, The Characters, and Michael Bolton's Big, Sexy Valentine's Day Special.

== Personal life ==
Kanin married Christina Angelides, daughter of former California state treasurer Phil Angelides, in 2011.

== Awards and nominations ==
Year	Award	Category	Nominated work	Result	Ref.
2011	Silver Reuben Award	Gag Cartoons	—N/a	Won	
2012	Primetime Emmy Awards	Outstanding Writing for a Variety Series	Saturday Night Live	Nominated	
2013	Primetime Emmy Awards	Outstanding Writing for a Variety Series	Saturday Night Live	Nominated	
2013	Primetime Emmy Awards	Outstanding Writing for a Variety Special	Saturday Night Live Weekend Update Thursday	Nominated	
2016	Primetime Emmy Awards	Outstanding Writing for a Variety Series	Saturday Night Live	Nominated	
2022	Primetime Emmy Awards	Outstanding Short Form Comedy, Drama Or Variety Series	I Think You Should Leave with Tim Robinson	Nominated	
2023	Primetime Emmy Awards	Outstanding Short Form Comedy, Drama Or Variety Series	I Think You Should Leave with Tim Robinson	Won	
2026	Primetime Emmy Awards	Outstanding Writing for a Comedy Series	The Chair Company	Nominated	
2013	Writers Guild of America Awards	Comedy/Variety Talk Series	Saturday Night Live	Nominated	
2014	Writers Guild of America Awards	Comedy/Variety Talk Series	Saturday Night Live	Nominated	
2015	Writers Guild of America Awards	Comedy/Variety Talk Series	Saturday Night Live	Nominated	
2016	Writers Guild of America Awards	Comedy/Variety Talk Series	Saturday Night Live	Nominated	
2017	Writers Guild of America Awards	Comedy/Variety Talk Series	Saturday Night Live	Won	
2018	Writers Guild of America Awards	Comedy/Variety Music, Awards, Tributes, Specials	Michael Bolton's Big, Sexy Valentine's Day Special	Nominated	
2020	Writers Guild of America Awards	Comedy/Variety Sketch Series	I Think You Should Leave	Won	
2022	Writers Guild of America Awards	Comedy/Variety Sketch Series	I Think You Should Leave	Won	
