= Justin Harrell =

American football player (born 1984)

- Harrell with the Green Bay Packers in 2007

No. 91
- Position: Defensive tackle

Personal information
- Born: February 14, 1984 (age 42); Martin, Tennessee, U.S.
- Listed height: 6 ft 4 in (1.93 m)
- Listed weight: 315 lb (143 kg)

Career information
- High school: Westview (Martin)
- College: Tennessee (2002–2006)
- NFL draft: 2007: 1st round, 16th overall pick

Career history
- Green Bay Packers (2007–2010)

Awards and highlights
- Super Bowl champion (XLV); Second-team All-SEC (2005); Cotton Bowl Classic Defensive MVP (2005)

Career NFL statistics
- Total tackles: 28
- Stats at Pro Football Reference

Justin Tyrell Harrell (born February 14, 1984) is an American former professional football player who was a defensive tackle in the National Football League (NFL). He was selected by the Green Bay Packers 16th overall in the 2007 NFL draft and was part of their Super Bowl XLV championship against the Pittsburgh Steelers. He played college football for the Tennessee Volunteers.

== Early life ==
Harrell was named the 2A Mr. Football in Tennessee and was named All-American by PrepStar recruiting service. During his senior season at tight end he caught 18 passes for 354 yards and six touchdowns. Harrell attended Westview High School in Martin, Tennessee where his team was a state runner-up his senior year. He started three years in basketball and averaged 17 points per game. He also started all four years in football.

== College career ==
Harrell attended and played college football at the University of Tennessee.

== Professional career ==
Pre-draft measurables
Height	Weight	Arm length	Hand span	40-yard dash	10-yard split	20-yard split	20-yard shuttle	Three-cone drill	Vertical jump	Broad jump	Bench press
6 ft 4 3/8 in (1.94 m)	300 lb (136 kg)	34 1/2 in (0.88 m)	9 3/4 in (0.25 m)	5.08 s	1.77 s	2.97 s	4.79 s	7.63 s	30.5 in (0.77 m)	9 ft 0 in (2.74 m)	31 reps

At the 2007 NFL draft, Harrell was selected 16th overall in the first round by the Green Bay Packers. He was the second defensive tackle taken in the draft after Amobi Okoye (Texans).

Harrell took part in only limited drills with the Packers in their organized team activities (OTA) practices as a result of the torn biceps tendon suffered while playing for Tennessee. Harrell was cleared to practice with the team at the preseason camp which began July 28. Harrell immediately drew criticism for showing up to OTA and Training Camp his rookie season out of shape and slightly overweight.

On July 27, 2007, Harrell signed a six-year contract with the Packers. The deal reportedly had a maximum value of just under $15 million with approximately $8 million guaranteed. Harrell played in his first NFL game on October 7, 2007, against the Chicago Bears in Week 5.

Harrell spent 2008 training camp on the Active/Physically Unable to Perform (PUP) list. On August 25, he was placed on the Reserve/PUP list, forcing him to miss the first six weeks of the regular season. He was activated on November 1 after defensive end Kabeer Gbaja-Biamila was released. On August 4, 2009, Harrell again injured his back during training camp practice and was inactive for the entire 2009 season.

In the season opener of the 2010 football season, Harrell suffered a torn ACL and was placed on Injured Reserve, ending his season. He earned a Super Bowl title when the Packers defeated the Steelers in Super Bowl XLV.

As of the conclusion of the 2010 season, Harrell had participated in just 14 regular season games over four seasons. He was released on July 28, 2011.
