= Sidney Stripling =

Sidney Stripling was an African American old-time and blues musician from Kathleen, Georgia. He is believed to have been born in the 19th century, and died some time between 1941 and 1945.

At the request of Alan Lomax, in charge of the Archive of American Folk Song at the Library of Congress, John Wesley Work III of Fisk University recorded ten of Stripling's songs at the Fort Valley State College Folk Festival in Fort Valley, Georgia in March 1941. These are the only known recordings of the artist, and include ballads, spirituals, blues, dance tunes and children's songs. Stripling sings and plays what may be a four-string banjo in a style typical of the period around 1900.

== Available recordings ==
The recordings of Stripling found in The Archive of Folk Culture are:

AFS 5149

- B1. "Standin' on the Corner Smokin' a Cheap Cigar"

AFS 5154

- A2. "Hammering in My Soul"
- B2. "Whoa, Mule Whoa"

AFS 5155

- A1. "Alabama Red"
- A2. "Coon Gi'nt"

AFS 5161

- A1. "Breakaway"
- A2. "Sevassafool"
- B1. "Where You Been So Long" (with Gus Gibson, guitar)
- B2. "Lookin' For the Bully in This Town"
- B3. "Sally Walker"

The following songs have been published on the CD Deep River of Song: Georgia (Rounder Records 2001), a selection of songs from the Allan Lomax Collection:

- "Sally Walker" (Children's song)
- "Coon Gi'nt" ("Coonjine")
- "Breakaway"
- "Sevassafool" ("Sebastopol")

The song "Breakaway" is featured on the soundtrack of the Martin Scorsese movie Gangs of New York (2002).

== Trivia ==
- Is the Great-Grandfather (paternal) of the American socialite David Stripling.
