= Nate Jackson (comedian) =

American stand-up comedian (born 1983)

- Born: August 14, 1983 (age 43); Lacey, Washington, US
- Education: Eastern Washington University

Comedy career
- Years active: 2004–present
- Medium: Stand-up comedian; Actor; Radio
- Genres: Observational comedy; improvisational comedy; sketch comedy; black comedy; insult comedy; satire

TikTok information
- Page: Nate Jackson
- Followers: 4.5 million
- Last updated: July 15, 2025
- Website: Official website

Nate Jackson (born August 14, 1983) is an American stand-up comedian. Jackson was a contributor for Wild 'n Out. He has also appeared on Young Rock and his own television special on Netflix titled Nate Jackson: Super Funny.

== Career ==
Jackson was born on August 14, 1983, and raised in Lacey/Olympia, Washington.

He studied organizational communications at Eastern Washington University and graduated in 2006. While attending university, Jackson was dared by one of his friends to enter a comedy contest. After graduating from Eastern, he pursued his comedy career in Hollywood, California. Jackson was a semi-finalist at the 2007 Bay Area Black Comedy Competition and Festival (BABCCF), first runner-up in the 2008 Seattle International Comedy Competition, and finalist in the 2008 California Comedy Festival.

When he moved back to Tacoma, Washington, he performed at numerous comedy rooms around the greater Puget Sound area. Jackson launched the “Super Funny Comedy Show” in 2010. That same year, Jackson won the Bay Area Black Comedy Competition hosted by the Full Vision Arts Foundation. In 2021, Jackson opened up his own comedy club called "Super Funny Comedy Club." His club is one of only four Black-owned comedy clubs in the United States and the biggest in the Pacific Northwest.

Jackson has had presence on various social media platforms, but during the COVID-19 pandemic, Jackson committed to TikTok, having been convinced by Matt Rife, who also found commercial success via social media.

At the end of 2024, Jackson closed the Super Funny Comedy Club with no explanation. In early 2025, Jackson re-opened the club within the Courtyard Tacoma Downtown Marriott, which allowed the club to have more staffing, resources, and accommodations.

In 2023, Jackson signed with CAA for representation.

Jackson's debut standup special premiered on Netflix on July 8, 2025. Jackson is set to star in The Office spinoff show titled The Paper.

== Style ==
Jackson is known for his high-energy style and crowd work. His stand-up utilizes extensive audience interaction.

== Filmography ==
Year	Title	Role	Notes	Ref(s)
2011–2012	Will to Live	Bobby Maulsey	TV docuseries	
2013	The P Word	Himself	Comedy short; Also wrote, directed, and edited	
2014	Tosh.0	Himself	1 episode	
2014	Marvin Road	Zeke	Short film; Also writer.	
2015	She Wins	Nate	Feature film	
2015	Laff Mobb's We Got Next	Writer	1 episode	
2017	Cause and Effect	Rob	Short-film	
2017	All Def Comedy	Himself	1 episode	
2018	Wild 'n Out	Himself	13 episodes; Also creative consultant	
2018	Coming to the Stage	Creator	1 episode; Also writer.	
2020	Love & Brotherhood	Arnold	TV series	
2021	My Dead Dad	Ron	Television film	
2021	Curb Your Enthusiasm	Homeowner	1 episode	
2021–22	Young Rock	Junkyard Dog	5 episodes	
2022	American Dreamer	Valet	Film	
2022	Spirited	Recruit Guy	Film	
2023	Love & Brotherhood Sequel	Arnold	Film	
2025	Good Fortune	Denny's employee	Post-production	

=== Standup Specials ===
Year	Title	Notes	Ref(s)
2025	Nate Jackson: Super Funny	Also writer and executive producer; Netflix special	

== Tours ==
- Super Funny World Tour (2024–2025)
- Big Dog Tour (2025–present)
