= Sara M. Harvey =

American novelist

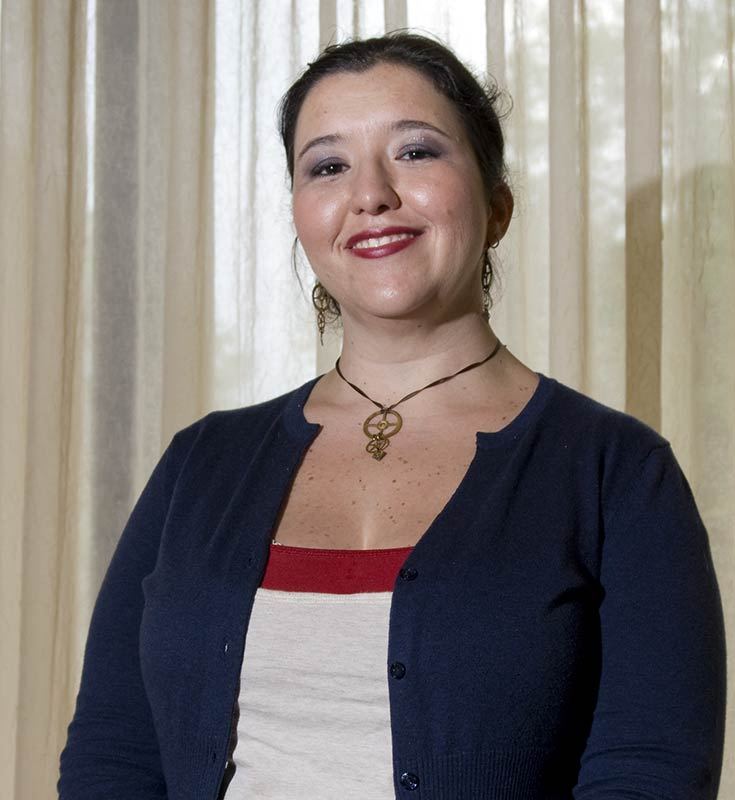
- Sara Harvey, 2009
- Born: March 11, 1976 (age 50); San Leandro, California, U.S.
- Education: University of California, Santa Cruz (BA); New York University (MA)
- Occupations: Writer and costumer
- Children: 1
- Website: saramharvey.com

Sara M. Harvey (born March 11, 1976) is an American costume designer, and an author of fiction and nonfiction, most notably having written multiple articles for the Greenwood Encyclopedia of Clothing Through World History. She is a regular speaker on the subjects of costume design at science-fiction conventions, and has won awards for her plus-sized creations.

== Early life ==
Harvey was born in San Leandro, California, and grew up in the East Bay area of Castro Valley, California. She graduated from Moreau Catholic High School and attended college at the University of Puget Sound in Tacoma, Washington, and California State University, East Bay in Hayward, California before earning a Bachelor of Arts in theater arts with an emphasis in costume design from the University of California, Santa Cruz. She later received a Master of Arts in visual culture, with an emphasis in costume history, from New York University.

== Costuming ==
Harvey spent several years working for the costume department of the Renaissance Entertainment Corporation on events held in California and Wisconsin. She also spent a year and three months working in the Creative Costume Department of Walt Disney World in Orlando (Lake Buena Vista), Florida.

She was an instructor of design and fashion history at the International Academy of Design and Technology branch in Nashville, Tennessee, known as IADT Nashville, which has since closed. She makes frequent appearances at conventions, speaking about and demonstrating costuming techniques at conferences such as Arisia, MidSouthCon, Hypericon, and Archon.

Harvey lives in Nashville, Tennessee with her husband and child.

== Published works ==
=== Fiction ===
- Music City, June 2014, Mother of Muses Publishing, ISBN 978-0-9905123-0-1
- Seven Times a Woman, November 2011, New Babel Books, ISBN 978-0-9848828-0-9
- The Tower of the Forgotten, July 2011, Apex Book Company, ISBN 978-1-937009-00-7
- Labyrinth of the Dead, June 2010, Apex Book Company, ISBN 978-0-9845535-0-1
- The Convent of the Pure, April 2009, Apex Book Company, ISBN 978-0-9816390-9-3
- "Lost and Found," March 2009, short story, Kerlak Publishing, appearing in the Dragons Composed anthology.
- "The Muse," December 2007, short story, Circle Dark Publishing e-book anthology Twilight and Thorns.
- A Year and a Day, August 2006, paperback novel, Premium Press America under Long Meadow Books imprint, ISBN 978-1-933725-13-0

=== Non-fiction ===
- The American Beauty Industry, 2010, Greenwood Publishing Group. Harvey contributed entries on fashion magazines, wigs, the "Natural Look," fashion designers, retail, and manufacturing.
- Encyclopedia of World Dress and Costume, 2010, Greenwood Publishing Group. Harvey contributed chapters on Italy, Portugal, and the United Kingdom.
- Harvey, Sara M. (2001). "The Juni-Hito Styles of Heian Japan". Clothesline. clotheslinejournal.com.
- Clothing in World History, December 2007, Greenwood Publishing Group:
  - Costumes and history of ancient Persia
  - Harvey, Sara M. (2007). "The Northern Renaissance". In Condra, Jill (ed.). The Greenwood Encyclopedia of Clothing through World History: Volume 2, 1501-1800. Greenwood. p. 61. ISBN 978-0-313-33664-5.
  - The 1960s and 1970s.
  - Harvey, Sara M. (2008). "The Seventeenth Century". In Condra, Jill (ed.). The Greenwood Encyclopedia of Clothing Through World History. Greenwood Publishing Group. ISBN 978-0-313-33664-5.
  - Harvey, Sara M. (2007). "The Nineteenth Century". In Condra, Jill (ed.). The Greenwood Encyclopedia of Clothing Through World History. Greenwood Publishing Group. ISBN 978-0-313-33664-5.
