= USS Stribling (DD-96) =

Wickes-class destroyer

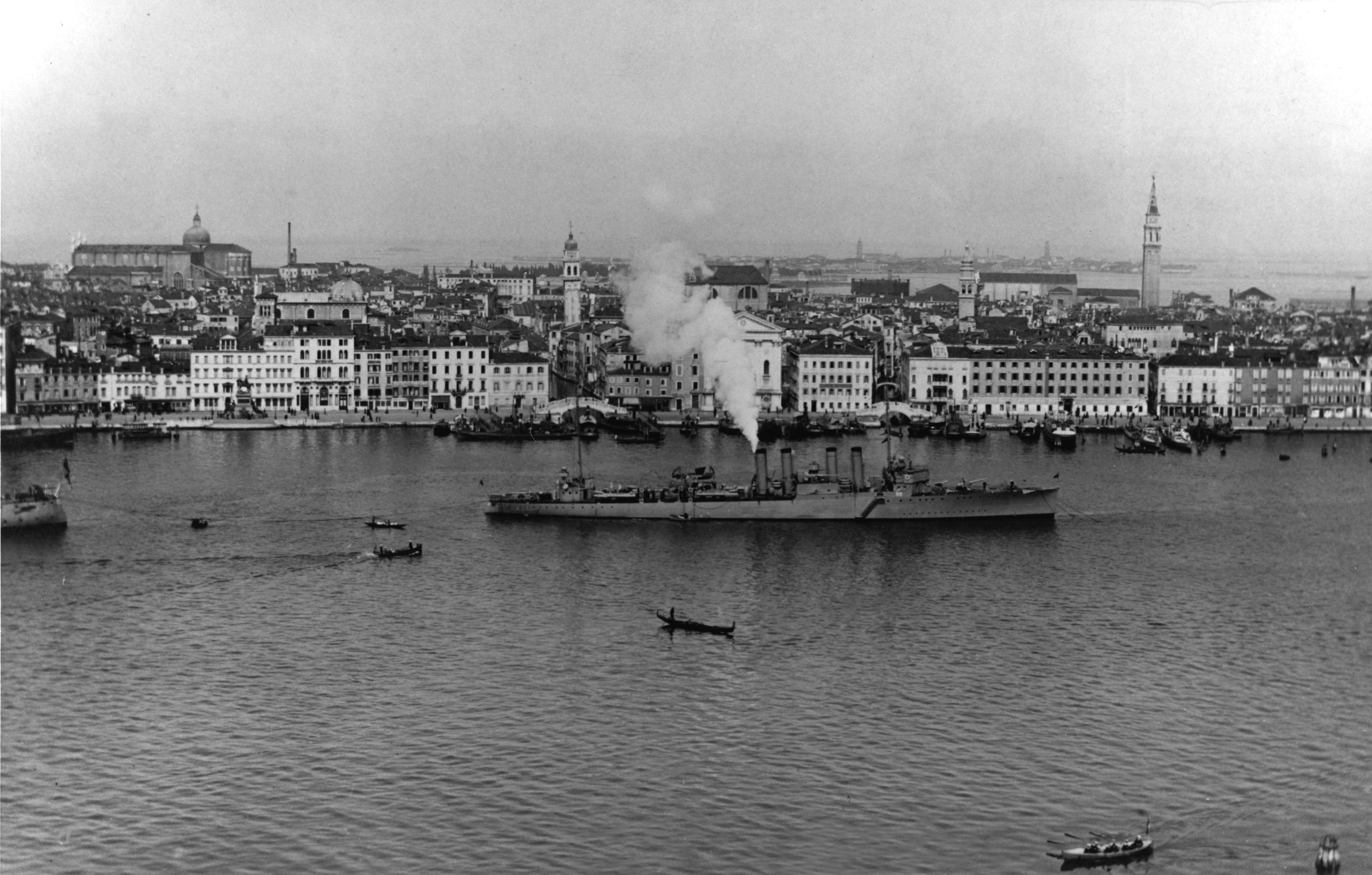
- USS Stribling at Venice, Italy, on 10 April 1919

History

United States
- Name: Stribling
- Namesake: Cornelius Kinchiloe Stribling
- Builder: Fore River Shipyard, Quincy, Massachusetts
- Laid down: 14 December 1917
- Launched: 29 May 1918
- Commissioned: 16 August 1918
- Decommissioned: 26 June 1922
- Reclassified: 17 July 1920, DM-1
- Stricken: 1 December 1936
- Fate: Sunk as target, January 1937

General characteristics
- Class & type: Wickes-class destroyer
- Displacement: 1,191 tons
- Length: 314 ft 4 1/2 in (95.8 m)
- Beam: 30 ft 11 1/4 in (9.4 m)
- Draft: 9 ft 2 in (2.8 m)
- Speed: 35 knots (65 km/h)
- Complement: 108 officers and enlisted
- Armament: 4 × 4 in (102 mm)/50 guns; 2 × 1-pounder gun; 12 × 21 in (533 mm) torpedo tubes

USS Stribling (DD-96) was a Wickes-class destroyer in the United States Navy during World War I and the years following. She was the first ship named in honor of Cornelius Stribling.

== Construction and commissioning ==
Stribling was laid down at Quincy, Massachusetts, on 14 December 1917 by the Fore River Shipbuilding Company. The ship was launched on 29 May 1918, sponsored by Miss Mary Calvert Stribling. The destroyer was commissioned at the Boston Navy Yard on 16 August 1918.

== Service history ==
On 31 August 1918, Stribling departed New York to escort a convoy across the Atlantic Ocean. However, machinery trouble forced her back into New York the following day. After almost three weeks in port, she got underway again on 18 September 1918, this time as an escort to a Gibraltar-bound convoy. She fueled at Ponta Delgada in the Azores and made Gibraltar in early October 1918. From there, she sailed with a convoy for Marseille on 10 October 1918. For the next month, she made several Gibraltar-to-Marseille circuits with Allied convoys.

After the Armistice of 11 November 1918 that ended World War I, Stribling steamed to Venice, Italy, to investigate post-armistice conditions there and at various other ports on Italy's Adriatic coast and in Dalmatia. At the completion of that duty, she headed back to the United States, arriving home in July 1919. Stribling entered the Portsmouth Navy Yard for overhaul and repairs before being placed in reduced commission at Philadelphia. There, she was converted to a light minelayer and, on 17 July 1920, she was redesignated DM-1.

In September 1921, she departed Philadelphia and teamed to the United States West Coast and, from there, proceeded on to Pearl Harbor, Hawaii. After a series of maneuvers in the Hawaiian Islands, Stribling was decommissioned on 26 June 1922. On 1 December 1936, her name was struck from the Navy list. The following month, her hulk was towed to San Pedro, California, where she was sunk as a target in January 1937.
