= Iron Mike Norton =

American blues musician (born 1973)

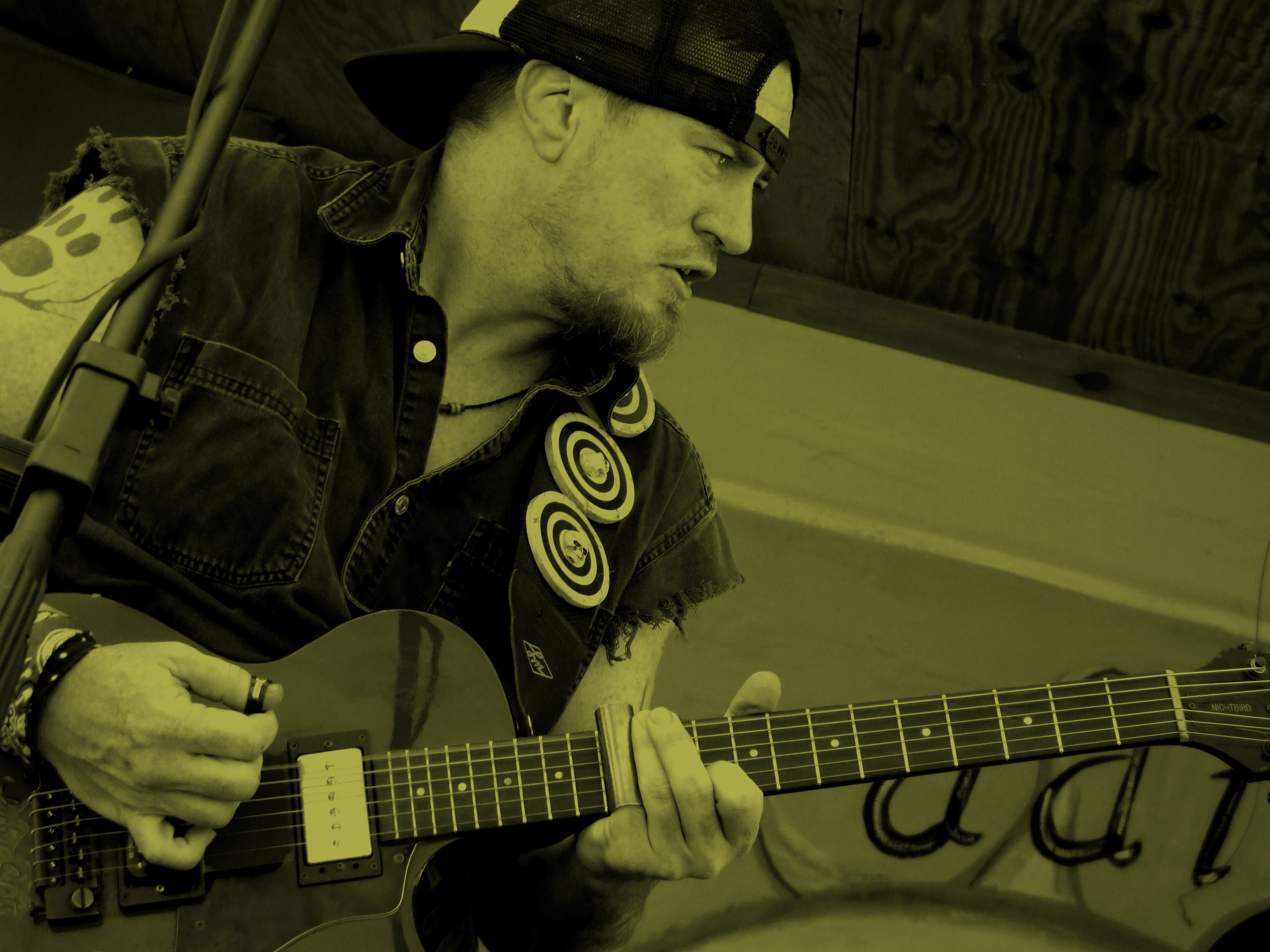

Background information
- Also known as: Michael Shaun Norton
- Born: October 20, 1973 (age 52); Fort Gordon, Georgia
- Genres: Blues, Southern rock, country
- Occupations: Musician, singer-songwriter, record producer
- Instruments: Guitar. vocals, dobro
- Years active: 1997–present
- Label: GFO
- Website: www.ironmikenorton.com

Iron Mike Norton (born October 20, 1973) is an American blues musician who plays slide guitar. Known as "the King of Swamp Stomp", Norton developed a style of blues that combines elements of traditional hill country slide guitar, with modern elements of hip-hop and other modern urban styles of music.

== Career ==
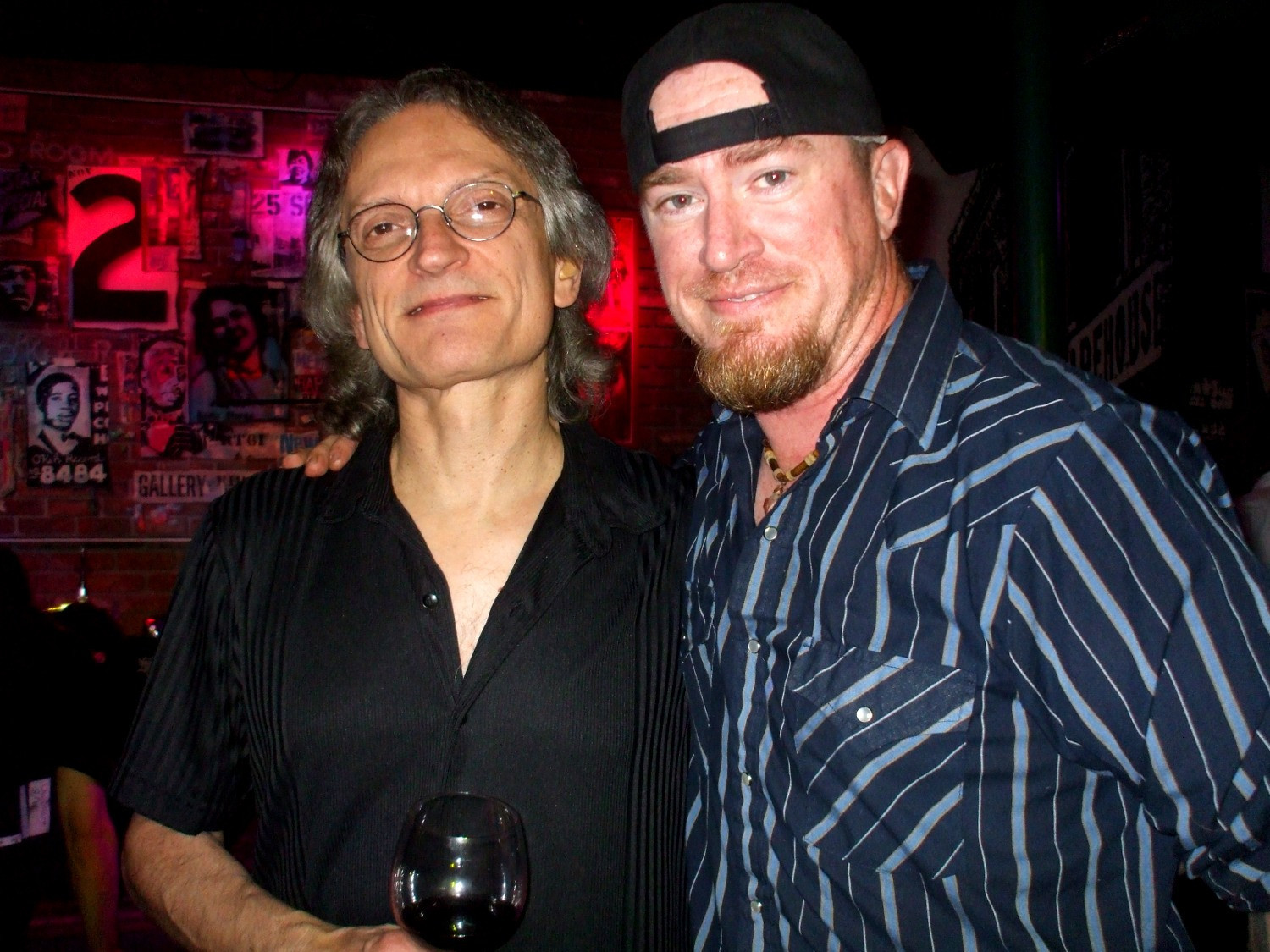
Iron Mike Norton with Sonny Landreth after their performance in Lake Worth, FL

Norton was born in Fort Gordon, Georgia and raised in Springfield, Missouri and St. Petersburg, Florida. He started his professional career as a session bass player in the Tampa Bay area heavy metal scene but eventually moved on to work as a roadie for several country music acts including Mel McDaniel in the early 1990s. From 1995 to 1997, Mike was the lead vocalist for the country rock act Ozark, which was nominated for Airplay International's Nashville King Eagle Award in 1997.

In 1997, Norton met Sonny Landreth and began to learn slide guitar. Through his personal and professional friendship with Landreth, Mike developed his slide guitar technique that included many of the techniques pioneered by Sonny.

Prior to 2005, he toured and performed as Michael Shaun Norton. He has worked alongside such artists as Sonny Landreth, Willie Nelson, Lyle Lovett, Eric Sardinas, Rob Zombie, The Outlaws, Waylon Jennings, and Wynonna, among others.

== Playing style ==
Norton is best known for his slide playing, having developed a technique pioneered by his mentor Sonny Landreth where he frets notes and plays chords behind the slide. He is also known for employing right hand finger tapping techniques in combination with his slide work. North is considered one of the foremost practitioners of Landreth's fret behind the slide techniques.

== Discography ==
=== As Michael Shaun Norton ===
- Spooky & the Blue Voodoo Tribe (2000), B&M Records
- Red Rum (2002), B&M Records
- Carpe Noctum (2003), B&M Records
- Hellhound (2005), B&M Records

=== As Iron Mike Norton ===
- Sledge (2007), GFO Records
- Live Free or Die (2009), GFO Records
- Dirty South (2011), GFO Records
- Bad Monkey (2012), GFO Records
- Bloody Knuckles (2013), GFO Records
- Box Fulla Bones (2015), GFO Records
- Swamp Stomp (2017), GFO Records
