= USS Stribling (DD-867) =

Gearing-class destroyer

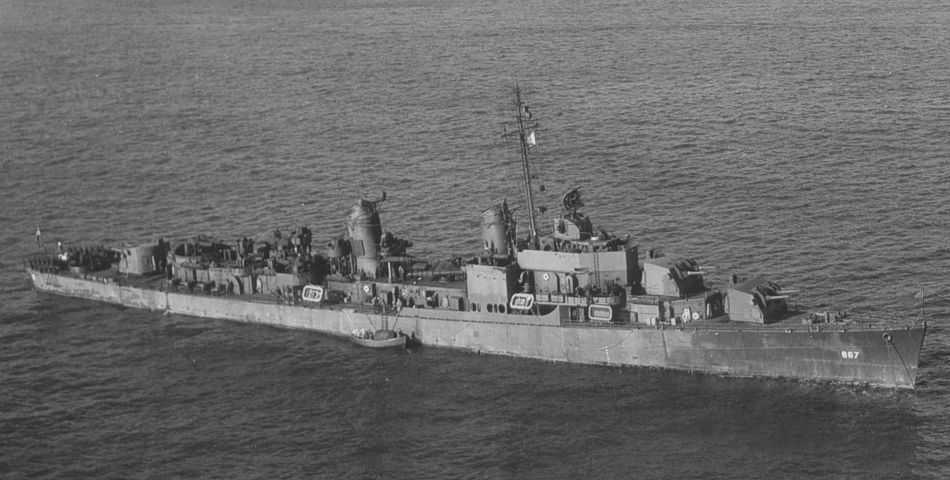
- USS Stribling in 1945

History

United States
- Name: USS Stribling
- Namesake: Cornelius Stribling
- Builder: Bethlehem Mariners Harbor, Staten Island, New York City
- Laid down: 15 January 1945
- Launched: 8 June 1945
- Commissioned: 29 September 1945
- Decommissioned: 1 July 1976
- Stricken: 1 July 1976
- Identification: Callsign: NBGI; Hull number: DD-867
- Honors and awards: 2 battle stars (Vietnam)
- Fate: Sunk as target, 27 July 1980

General characteristics
- Class & type: Gearing-class destroyer
- Displacement: 3,460 long tons (3,516 t) full
- Length: 390 ft 6 in (119.02 m)
- Beam: 40 ft 10 in (12.45 m)
- Draft: 14 ft 4 in (4.37 m)
- Propulsion: Geared turbines, 2 shafts, 60,000 shp (45 MW)
- Speed: 35 knots (65 km/h; 40 mph)
- Range: 4,500 nmi (8,300 km) at 20 kn (37 km/h; 23 mph)
- Complement: 336
- Armament: 6 × 5"/38 caliber guns; 12 × 40 mm AA guns; 11 × 20 mm AA guns; 10 × 21 inch (533 mm) torpedo tubes; 6 × depth charge projectors; 2 × depth charge tracks

USS Stribling was a Gearing-class destroyer in the United States Navy. She was the second US Navy ship named for Admiral Cornelius Kincheloe Stribling.

Stribling was laid down by the Bethlehem Steel Corporation at Staten Island in New York on 15 January 1945, launched on 8 June 1945 by Mrs. W. Hunter Powell and commissioned on 29 September 1945.

== Service history ==
=== 1945–1950 ===
Stribling shook down out of Guantánamo Bay, Cuba; then reported for duty at the Fleet Sonar School at Key West, Florida. In 1948, she embarked upon the first of a career-long series of deployments to the Mediterranean Sea. Between 1948 and 1953, Stribling spent a portion of each year in the "middle sea." During the 1948 cruise, she flew the United Nations flag while on Palestine Patrol. In 1949, she became the first American ship to visit a Spanish port since the outbreak of the Spanish Civil War in 1936. While deployed with the 6th Fleet again in 1950, she visited a number of northern European ports.

=== 1953–1958 ===
On 23 August 1953, Stribling set sail from Norfolk for the Panama Canal and duty with the Pacific Fleet. She reached Yokosuka on 3 October and, after a brief upkeep period, commenced Korean War operations. The destroyer operated intermittently with the carriers of Task Force (TF) 77 in the Sea of Japan and with TF 95, the United Nations Escort and Blockading Force, along the west coast of Korea and in the Yellow Sea. When not patrolling with TF 95 or TF 77, Stribling trained and visited Far Eastern ports for liberty.

In March 1954, she continued her voyage around the world. On the 19th, she put into Port Said, Egypt, and then sailed through the Mediterranean, visiting the sunny liberty ports along the way. On 10 April, she completed her circumnavigation of the globe at Norfolk. Over the next six years, Stribling resumed her schedule of 6th Fleet deployments alternated with tours of duty with the 2nd Fleet in the western Atlantic and Caribbean Sea. Constant training and exercises, both American and NATO, characterized the bulk of her activities during that period. She was in the Mediterranean in 1958 during the Lebanon crisis and stood by to lend a hand until it was resolved.

=== 1960–1969 ===
The period from June 1960 to April 1966 brought significant changes to Stribling. From June 1960 until April 1966, she was modified extensively at the Charleston Navy Yard under the Fleet Rehabilitation and Modernization (FRAM) program. After refresher training out of Guantanamo Bay and participation in NATO exercise "Lime Jug," Stribling stood watch during the recovery of astronaut, John Glenn, in February 1962. In August, she deployed to the 6th Fleet, but spent at least a third of that tour in the vicinity of the Persian Gulf, operating with the Middle East Force. She exercised with units of the Saudi Arabian and Iranian navies and visited many new ports, notably Djibouti in French Somaliland, Kharg Island in Iran, and Aden. Stribling's next two deployments were also with the Middle East Force. In the spring of 1966, the destroyer received a Drone Antisubmarine Helicopter (DASH) system and, by 4 May 1966, completed DASH qualification. In February and March 1966, she participated in Polaris missile firing tests on the Atlantic test range.

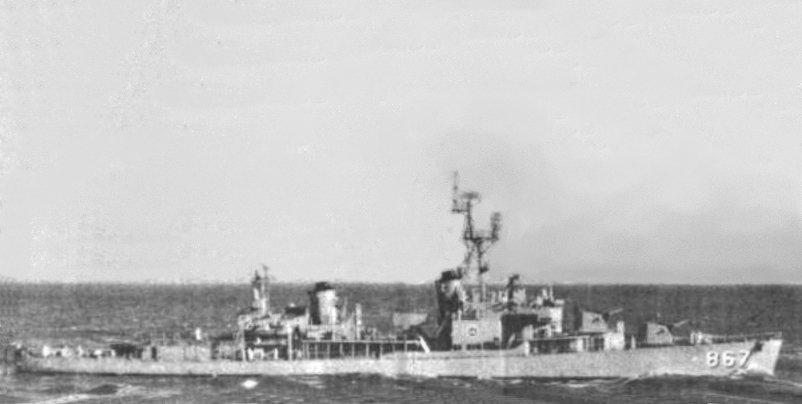
USS Stribling (DD-867) after FRAM I.

On 30 January 1969, Stribling put to sea from Mayport, Florida, to make her second voyage to the Far East. Heading via the Panama Canal, San Diego, and Pearl Harbor, the destroyer made for Yokosuka, Japan, and then operations off the coast of Vietnam. Stribling participated in "Sea Dragon" and "Market Time" operations, and her duties also included bombardments on the gunline, search and rescue missions usually for downed carrier pilots, and Positive Identification Radar Advisory Zone (PIRAZ) duty. The latter assignment involved riding "shotgun" for larger PIRAZ ships armed with more sophisticated radar and target designation systems. That summer, Stribling plane-guarded for the carriers operating on "Yankee Station" in the Gulf of Tonkin. When not operating in the combat zone, she put into Kaohsiung, Taiwan; Hong Kong; and Subic Bay in the Philippines for repairs after a collision with a barge being towed by RVN tug during a nighttime underway replenishment . On 2 August 1969, Stribling cleared the combat zone to return home. On her way, she stopped at Kure and Yokosuka, Japan; Pearl Harbor; San Diego; Acapulco Mexico, and Panama. On 17 September 1969, she reentered Mayport.

=== 1970–1976 ===
Upon her return from Vietnam, Stribling resumed her routine of Mediterranean deployments and Atlantic seaboard duty. The first 6th Fleet deployment (from August 1970 to March 1971) was an active tour of duty, encompassing as it did the Jordanian crisis of 1970. With Syrian elements and left-wing Jordanians attempting to topple King Hussein from his throne, the 6th Fleet was mobilized to maintain a striking force poised in the eastern Mediterranean. Operating in much the same manner as she did in Vietnam in 1969, Stribling cruised along the coast of Syria on Bravo Station in the anti-aircraft screen for the 6th Fleet until the crisis abated. On 22 October, Stribling pursued an unidentified nuclear submarine, stalking her quarry for almost 48 hours.

Stribling's second deployment, from February until September 1972, was far more routine. It was given over to normal operations and exercises with other units of the fleet and with units of foreign navies. In March 1973, she sailed around the Cape of Good Hope and up through the Indian Ocean to rejoin the Middle East Force. After her return to the United States from that deployment, Stribling operated with the 2nd Fleet in the western Atlantic. She left the area only once in that time, during September and October 1974, to participate in exercise "Northern Merger." That cruise took her to the Netherlands and England for port visits. In mid-October 1974, she resumed her eastern seaboard operations.

The aging Stribling made her final Mediterranean cruise in early 1976, just before decommissioning, due to urgent deployment requirements during this period. Stribling was equipped with electronic intelligence gear on the helicopter deck for this cruise, as well as with experimental sonar "classification" equipment installed by the University of Texas. Stribling made this last cruise with concrete poured into her bilges to stop many hull leaks that had not been repaired.

=== Decommissioning and disposal ===
Stribling was decommissioned and stricken from the Naval Vessel Register on 1 July 1976. She was sunk as a target on 27 July 1980.

One of her anchors currently resides on display outside VFW Post #220 in Mays Landing, New Jersey.

== Awards ==
Stribling earned two battle stars during the Vietnam War. Per Navy Unit Awards posted on awards.navy.mil for the USS Stribling DD-867, the ship received the Navy's Meritorious Unit Commendation for the period 12 September 1970 to 31 October 1970. She earned the Navy Expeditionary Medal for the period 1 July 1961 to 18 August 1961. The Stribling also earned credit for the Armed Forces Expeditionary Medal for the periods 17 to 23 July 1958; 25 June 1968; and 9 to 15 June 1969. Credit for Vietnam Service was accrued during the periods 20 March 1969 to 25 April 1969; 4 to 26 May 1969; 28 June 1969 to 2 July 1969; and 12 July 1969 to 3 August 1969. The Stribling also earned credit for the Republic of Vietnam Gallantry Cross Unit Citation with Palm during the periods 21 March 1969 to 2 April 1969; and 23 to 26 July 1969.
