= Planet Ant =

Artist community

Coordinates: 42°23′54.6″N 83°03′50.0″W

Planet Ant Theatre
- Interactive map of Planet Ant Theatre
- Location: 2357 Caniff Ave; Hamtramck, Michigan 48212; United States
- Type: Non-profit

Construction
- Opened: 1996

Website
- Planet Ant

Planet Ant is a non-profit artist community founded in 1993 in Hamtramck, Michigan. Having grown from its origins as a coffee shop, it is part of Detroit's independent theatre and comedy community.

Planet Ant is an example of an artist incubator where actors, directors, sound designers, and stage managers practice their craft. At least five actors, including Keegan-Michael Key, Marc Evan Jackson, Sam Richardson, Tim Robinson, Margaret Edwartowski, and Jaime Moyer can trace their beginnings to Planet Ant.

The theatre has also hosted and participated in several performing arts festivals, including the Detroit Women of Comedy Festival, the Off Campus Improv Fest, and Uncaged, a film event dedicated to Nicholas Cage. It also takes part in the annual Detroit Improv Festival.

== Programs ==
Planet Ant's creative contributions include classes, performance troupes, and shows in the following principles:

- Improvisational comedy
- Sketch comedy
- Audiovisual and film production
- Stand-up comedy
- Scripted plays
- Storytelling

== Locations ==
Planet Ant operates out of several buildings and venues located in Hamtramck, Michigan:

- Black Box Theater
- Ant Hall
- Ghost Light Bar
- The Independent Comedy Club
