= Star Island (novel) =

Novel by Carl Hiaasen

- First edition
- Author: Carl Hiaasen
- Language: English
- Publisher: Alfred A. Knopf
- Publication date: 2010
- Publication place: United States
- Media type: Print (Hardback & Paperback)
- Pages: 352
- ISBN: 0-307-27258-3
- Preceded by: Nature Girl
- Followed by: Bad Monkey

Star Island is a 2010 novel by Carl Hiaasen. It takes its name from Star Island in Miami Beach, Florida, where part of the story takes place.

== Plot summary ==
Paparazzo "Bang" Abbott waits outside a posh South Beach hotel, following a tip that pop star Cherry Pye has overdosed again. However, when paramedics bring a woman down to the ambulance, he sees that she is a body double. Meanwhile, the real Cherry is being driven to the nearest hospital in a private limousine by her entourage. The body double is Ann DeLusia, an actress hired by Cherry's family to make brief public appearances when she is too inebriated to do so. Cherry's mother/manager, Janet Bunterman, tells Ann to take a few days off while Cherry is packed off, yet again, to rehab. Infuriated at having been fooled by a body double, Bang becomes even more obsessed with getting photos of Cherry under sordid circumstances.

In Los Angeles, Cherry jumps over the wall of the rehab center and hitches a ride to the airport from a nearby motorist, who happens to be Bang staking out the clinic. Pleased by his transparent flattery, Cherry takes him along when she charters a private jet back to Florida. Aboard the plane, Bang is astonished when she decides to have an onboard quickie with him. His astonishment turns to outrage when she drives away in a limousine and strands him at the airport, taking his camera bag and BlackBerry with her. Meanwhile, Ann spends her few days off touring the Florida Keys. While driving through Key Largo, she swerves to avoid a man scooping roadkill off the highway and drives off a bridge. When she wakes up, the man, "Skink," has rescued her.

An apologetic Skink brings Ann along on a mission to kidnap and intimidate real estate developer Jackie Sebago. Afterwards, Skink has a friend give Ann a ride to the nearest hospital, giving her the number for his seldom-used cell phone in case she ever needs help. Meanwhile, over Janet's protests, Cherry's record promoter, Maury Lykes, assigns a man nicknamed "Chemo" to replace her recently fired bodyguard. As revenge for her theft of his cameras and smartphone, Bang kidnaps Cherry outside her hotel at gunpoint, only to realize that the woman he has snatched is Ann. He demands, in exchange for Ann's safe return, that Cherry be made available to him for a private photo shoot. Ann is furious to hear that the Buntermans have not reported her missing. She hurriedly uses her cell phone to contact Skink.

When the Buntermans refuse Bang's demand, he dresses Ann up in costume and shoots pictures of her with a discarded syringe, making it look as if "Cherry" is a drug addict. His threat to release the photos is taken much more seriously than his threat against Ann's life. In fact, since Cherry's career is dangerously close to ending already, her father Ned suggests using the kidnapping as a publicity stunt to boost interest in her upcoming concert tour. The photo shoot and hostage exchange takes place on Star Island, in the rented home of Cherry's actor boyfriend. Cherry is duped into thinking that she is posing for the cover of Vanity Fair, while Ann confronts her employers over their indifference to her safety. At that moment, Skink tracks her down; Ann prefers to leave with him rather than the Buntermans.

After the photo shoot, Chemo confiscates the digital memory cards from Bang's cameras. Maury had ordered Chemo to kill Bang, but Bang convinces him they can make a fortune publishing the photos after Cherry is killed. Chemo decides to let Bang live and hangs onto the photos. Meanwhile, the Buntermans meet with Ann and Skink, offering $50,000 in hush money. Ann declines, settling instead for plane fare back to California and the price of a Zegna suit she bought for Skink. She also quits her role as Cherry's double, warning the Buntermans never to contact her again. Maury flirts with the idea of paying Chemo to kill Ann, but Chemo–having spent time with Cherry and her family–has taken Ann's side and warns Maury not to send anyone else after her.

The Buntermans admit to Cherry that the photo shoot was a ruse, but she is pleased to hear that she will be the star of a media blitz surrounding her fake kidnapping. However, she is upset when she is told that, to sell the story, she will need to be secluded for a few days, ostensibly "recovering" from her ordeal. With Skink's assistance, Ann makes a conspicuous appearance at a nightclub using Cherry's name. A short time later, Cherry escapes from her parents' guard and goes to the club. There, Ann tells Cherry about her role as Cherry's "stunt double." Cherry launches herself at Ann in an inebriated rage before Chemo carries her out. As he does so Cherry vomits, inadvertently ruining the memory cards in his pocket containing the photos.

Cherry's "meltdown" is captured by the paparazzi outside the club, instantly sabotaging her entourage's plan to sell the kidnapping story. Ann and Skink slip away in the chaos. Bang, however, does not get a photo of Cherry, as he is shot through the buttocks by a thug hired by a disgruntled tipster. In a touch of poetic justice, Bang finds himself on the receiving end of his profession's notorious indifference to pain and suffering: as he lies in agony on the sidewalk, none of his fellow "shooters" are inclined to give him aid and keep snapping photos as he is lifted into an ambulance.

The "meltdown" causes Cherry's career to collapse, and her parents separate. Maury is forced to flee the U.S. and is eventually murdered by the father of an underaged client. Chemo quits security work and returns to his former career as a mortgage loan broker. Bang is forced to switch careers, opening a small portrait studio in Culver City, California. Ann establishes herself as a serious actress in Hollywood. She never sees Skink again, but she hears from their mutual friend Jim Tile that he is "in a good place."

== Characters ==
=== Main characters ===
- Ann DeLusia: A struggling actress normally based in Los Angeles, Ann was hired by Cherry Pye's family largely because of their physical resemblance. Cherry frequently needs someone to impersonate her in public to cover up her episodes of excess (though Cherry herself is completely unaware of this). Other than their looks, Ann is Cherry's polar opposite in every way: sober, intelligent, and dependable.
- Claude "Bang" Abbott: Formerly a Pulitzer Prize-winning staff photographer for the St. Petersburg Times, Claude quit the paper under ignominious circumstances and now lives the frenzied, itinerant (but extremely lucrative) life of a paparazzo. Originally obsessed with snapping a photo of Cherry under sordid circumstances, he becomes obsessed in a different way when she seduces him in a drunken haze aboard a private jet.

=== The star and her entourage ===
- Cherry Pye: Born Cheryl Gail Bunterman, Cherry won early fame at age 14 with a one-line appearance in a Nickelodeon after-school TV special, which her aggressive parents and equally aggressive record promoter inflated into a career as a pop star (though her songs are entirely ghost-written and lip-synched, due to Cherry's nonexistent singing voice and general lack of musicality). Now aged 22, she is uncontrollably addicted to alcohol, drugs, and sexual promiscuity.
- Janet Bunterman: Cherry's mother and manager. Janet is fanatically devoted to promoting her daughter's stardom, and insists on maintaining "positive energy" at all times - which manifests itself as an immovable state of denial about Cherry's many addictions (for instance, blaming her frequent drug overdoses on attacks of gastritis).
- Ned Bunterman: Cherry's father and accountant. His devotion to his daughter's career (and the money it brings into the family coffers) is equal to his wife's, though he does not share her blindness to their daughter's fragile state. However, he is of minimal help since his wife usually takes the lead in dealing with their daughter.
- Maury Lykes: Cherry's record promoter (he became interested in her after seeing her on Nickelodeon, which he regularly watches, being a closet pedophile). Unlike the Buntermans, he has no illusions about Cherry's lack of talent and self-destructive tendencies, but has a heavy stake in her upcoming comeback album and concert tour.
- Lucy and Lila Lark: Cherry's publicists. Born fraternal twins, they were so alike in temperament and thought that they later achieved, through plastic surgery, a shared desire to become identical twins. They are renowned in the entertainment industry for their skill at spin doctoring and other forms of "damage control", which allows them to limit their clientele to only the most famous, or most recklessly self-destructive, celebrities.

== Reception ==
Louis Bayard, writing for The Washington Post, thought that. while the book was funny, it was kept from being great by the lack of insights that Hiaasen's satire made about this new subject of show business that aren't already played out. Colette Bancroft, of the St. Petersburg Times, thought that the satirizing of celebrity culture was "a blast". Associated Press reviewer Malcom Ritter found that the book was just as good as Hiaasen's previous novels with writing that made him "laugh out loud".
