= Michael Stribling =

American musician

Michael Stribling (born 1951) is an American musician, best known for his series of new-age albums. His debut new-age album, Songs of Hope and Healing, was named Best Electronic Album of 2006 by New Age Reporter.

== Biography ==
Stribling was born in 1951 in Merced, California, United States, the older of two children to Ivan Stribling and Lorraine Murphy Wenrich, later divorced. Stribling attended Merced High School, graduating in 1969. He next attended California State University Fresno, graduating in 1974 with a bachelor's degree in percussion performance. He later earned a master's degree in theology with an emphasis in marriage and family ministries from Fuller Theological Seminary in Pasadena, California.

Stribling began music lessons at age seven, studying violin, clarinet, and guitar, but when the Beatles arrived in 1964 he “switched to drums,” according to his website. He worked as a performer, composer, engineer, and in the 1970s worked as a radio announcer for a classic rock station.

From June 1974 to July 1975, he toured the U.S., Europe, and Canada with Johnny Mathis. He also performed with jazz performers of the time, including Clark Terry, Oliver Nelson, Cannonball Adderley and more.

Stribling lists his musical influences as including The Beatles, Jan Hammer, Vangelis, Paul Winter, J.S. Bach, Igor Stravinsky, Jimi Hendrix Joni Mitchell, Steely Dan, Peter Gabriel, and more.

Apart from his music career, Stribling has worked in many areas of the mental health field, working for outpatient mental health clinics, substance addiction treatment, foster care, and group homes. He became a licensed marriage and family therapist in April 1992.

== Works ==
- Journey Within, Leela Music, produced in 1989 and re-released by Leela Music in 2005.
- Songs of Hope and Healing, Leela Music, 2006.
- Reached No. 1 on the New Age Reporter Top 100 List
- Received New Age Reporter's Lifestyle Music Award for Best Electronic Album of 2006
- Out of the Darkness, Into the Light, Leela Music, 2007.
- Reached No. 2 on the New Age Reporter Top 100 List in its first month of release (January).
- Nominated for two 2007 Lifestyle Music Awards.
- Another Day in Paradise, Leela Music, 2007.
- Ranked in the Top 5 on the New Age Reporter Top 100 List for three months in a row (November & December, 2007; January, 2008).
- Nominated for a 2008 Lifestyle Music Award.
- Love, Light, and Water, Leela Music, 2008.
- Ranked in the Top 5 on the Zone Music Reporter Top 100 List.
- Nominated for a 2008 Lifestyle Music Award.
- The Promise, Leela Music, 2009.
- Received Zone Music Reporter's Award for Best Electronic Album of 2009
- Paradise Lost, Leela Music, 2010
- Ranked No. 2 on the Zone Music Reporter Top 100 List.
- Safely in the Arms of Love, Leela Music, 2011
- Ranked No. 3 on the Zone Music Reporter Top 100 List.
- A Better Place, Leela Music, 2015
- Ranked No. 3 on the Zone Music Reporter Top 100 List.
- Union – Music for Lovers, Leela Music, 2017
- Ranked No. 1 on the Zone Music Reporter Top 100 List.
- One World, Leela Music, 2019
