= Bad Monkey (novel) =

2013 novel by Carl Hiaasen

- Author: Carl Hiaasen
- Language: English
- Publisher: Alfred A. Knopf
- Publication date: 2013
- Publication place: United States
- Media type: Print (hardback & paperback)
- Preceded by: Star Island
- Followed by: Razor Girl

Bad Monkey is a 2013 satirical crime fiction novel by American author Carl Hiaasen. A television adaptation starring Vince Vaughn began airing on Apple TV+ in 2024.

A sequel, Razor Girl, was published in 2016.

== Plot summary ==
In mid-July, a sportfisherman tourist off the Florida Keys reels in a severed human arm. Monroe County Sheriff Sonny Summers, who is hyper-sensitive to any threat to the Keys' tourist trade, asks former detective Andrew Yancy to transport the arm to Miami and ensure that any investigation is handled by the Dade County authorities. In Miami, Yancy meets Dr. Rosa Campesino, the Assistant Dade County coroner, who tells him there is not enough evidence to connect the severed arm with any unsolved crimes in Dade County. Yancy's colleague Rogelio Burton advises him to drop the arm on the roadside on his way home, but he rebelliously decides to keep it preserved in his freezer.

Yancy is currently on suspension, having assaulted the husband of his lover Bonnie Witt, and is forced to work as a health inspector for the Department of Hotels and Restaurants. During their last night together before she moves to Sarasota with her husband, Bonnie confesses that she is really Plover Chase, a former Oklahoma high school teacher indicted for extorting sex from one of her underage students in exchange for giving him good grades. "Bonnie" jumped bail and moved to Florida under her assumed name, eventually meeting her husband.

A woman named Eve Stripling returns from a European vacation and reports her husband, Nicholas "Nick" Stripling, missing. A DNA test quickly matches the severed arm with Nick, who Eve says likely died in a boating accident. A funeral is held for Nick in which his arm is buried. However, Yancy becomes suspicious at Eve's lack of grief, which mounts when Caitlin, Nick's daughter and Eve's stepdaughter, angrily insists that Eve killed her father for his money.

Yancy witnesses Charles Phinney, the mate from the fishing boat that found the arm, being shot to death. Charles' distraught girlfriend Madeline admits to Yancy that a woman matching Eve's description gave him the arm and paid him to hook it on the tourist's fishing line. Investigating Nick's medical supply company, Yancy meets corrupt former surgeon Gomez O'Peele, who admits that Nick was defrauding Medicare out of millions of dollars. Inside the Striplings' vacation home, Yancy finds a hatchet and traces of blood, as well as bone splinters in the drain. He suspects that Eve killed her husband there, then arranged for the arm to be found so he could be declared legally dead.

Sonny has no desire to pursue the case any further, and Caitlin abandons her suspicions as soon as Eve offers her half of Nick's life insurance. Both tell Yancy to abandon his investigation, but he refuses. A short time later, Yancy is ambushed in his backyard, beaten and nearly drowned by a masked man fitting the description of the mate's killer. Additionally, Yancy notices that the man is wearing an expensive Tourbillon wristwatch that matches the one that left an imprint on the severed arm. Meanwhile, Rosa and Yancy eventually develop a relationship. She agrees to accompany him on an undercover trip to the island of Andros, where Eve and a mysterious male companion are developing a vacation resort.

On Andros, Yancy finds an unexpected ally in Neville Stafford, a Bahamian fisherman whose property was sold against his wishes to the new development, after which his family's beachfront home was demolished. Neville was so desperate to stop the development that he asked a local witch, the "Dragon Queen," to put a voodoo curse on the developer, Christopher Grunion. Neville even parts with his only companion, a capuchin monkey named Driggs, who is traded to the Dragon Queen. Christopher is believed to be Eve's mysterious boyfriend, whom Yancy has tracked via his seaplane registry as well as a record of the last phone call Gomez made before his death, provided by Rosa. Both provide the name Christopher Grunion.

Rosa volunteers to visit the Grunions alone, posing as a wealthy American interested in buying a piece of the future resort. While waiting, Yancy converses with Neville, who mentions that he stole some personal items from Grunion's garbage to give to the Dragon Queen, including fishing shirt sleeves that had been neatly cut off. Suddenly understanding, Yancy rushes to the Grunions' but is held at gunpoint by Christopher–actually Nick, alive and missing his left arm.

Like many Medicare fraudsters facing indictment, Nick decided he had to fake his death to escape prosecution. Unlike others, he decided to "foolproof" the deception by leaving behind actual human remains, instead of simply disappearing. Nick had his arm amputated by Gomez, then had Eve plant it in Florida before declaring him legally dead. Nick is about to shoot Yancy, but Eve insists that he be killed outside the house. Before Nick can fire he is ambushed by Neville, who stabs him with the broken shaft of a fishing rod Yancy brought with him. Fleeing the estate, Yancy and Neville run to the Dragon Queen's hut, where Nick's hired thug, Egg, has taken Rosa. They rescue her and Driggs, and Yancy threatens Nick's pilot into flying him and Rosa back to Miami.

Nick, rendered almost paraplegic by his injuries, lays all the blame on Eve for stopping him from shooting Yancy. Eve retaliates by drugging him and dumping his body in shark-infested waters. Attempting to speed away from the scene, Eve herself is killed when her boat crashes on a nearby reef. The only part of Nick recovered from the ocean is his right arm, which is buried with his left.

Returning home, Yancy's life is complicated by the reappearance of Bonnie. Finding herself pining for Yancy again, and having heard that he found another girlfriend, she showed her devotion by burning down a spec home next to Yancy's that was hindering his view of the sunset. Florida authorities offer to extradite her to Oklahoma to serve a minimum prison sentence for her earlier crimes, but she insists on staying in Florida to fight the arson charges. Sonny reluctantly gives Yancy credit for solving the case but tells him that it will be at least another year or two before it will be safe to reinstate Yancy as a detective. Yancy is disappointed, but happy to be in a steady relationship with Rosa. Back on Andros, Neville reclaims his home after the Striplings' resort project collapses.

== Characters ==
- Andrew Yancy: The protagonist, a former Miami-Dade Police detective, currently on suspension from the Monroe County Sheriff's office working as an inspector for the Monroe County Division of Hotels and Restaurants ("Roach Patrol", as Yancy puts it).
- Dr. Rosa Campesino: The Assistant Miami-Dade County coroner. Intelligent and determined, but burdened with a kinky streak that has worried some of her former lovers (one of whom broke up with her after she convinced him to have sex with her on an autopsy table in the morgue).
- Plover Chase/Bonnie Witt: Yancy's "future former girlfriend," the wife of a prominent Key West dermatologist. Formerly Plover Chase, an Oklahoma high school teacher indicted for having a sexual affair with one of her students.
- Eve Stripling: widow of the late Nicholas Stripling, who appears to claim her husband's severed arm.
- Nicholas Stripling/Christopher Grunion: Eve's husband, and the owner of the severed arm; a Medicare fraudster now living undercover under an assumed name to avoid prosecution.
- Caitlin Stripling-Cox: Nicholas Stripling's estranged daughter, a former fashion model and recovering drug addict. Loathes her stepmother only slightly more than her father.
- Simon Cox: Caitlin's husband, an ex-military serviceman now working in security.
- Neville Stafford: A Bahamian fisherman, whose modest beachfront home is purchased and then demolished by the neighboring resort development named Curly Tail Lane.
- "The Dragon Queen": A voodoo witch on the island of Andros.
- Evan Shook: A real-estate developer from New York State who has built a spec home next to Yancy's property, and is increasingly desperate to sell it.
- Dr. Gomez O'Peele: a defrocked orthopedic surgeon, one of Nicholas Stripling's "employees" in his Medicare fraud "business."
- Charles Phinney: The tattooed youth from the boat that reeled in the severed arm; later shot to death outside a Key West bar.
- Madeline: Phinney's girlfriend, whom Yancy guesses is 15 years older than Phinney. She is therefore in her 30s.
- John Wesley Wiedermann: An agent of the Oklahoma State Bureau of Investigation, sent to Florida to recapture Plover/Bonnie.
- Cody Parish: Bonnie Witt's former student/lover.
- Sonny Summers: The Monroe County Sheriff; elected by default, he is indolent, easily overwhelmed, and morbidly afraid of driving away tourists or upsetting the Keys' Chamber of Commerce members.
- Rogelio Burton: another detective for the Monroe County Sheriff's office, and a friend of Yancy.
- Tommy Lombardo: Yancy's immediate superior as a health inspector.
- Brennan: owner of Stoney's Crab Palace, the Keys' most popular restaurant, where Yancy often finds the worst health violations.
- K.J. Claspers: The Striplings' personal pilot, a retired cocaine smuggler.
- Carter "Egg" Ecclestone: a hired thug working for the Striplings on Andros.
- Driggs: Neville's sometime-companion, an incorrigible capuchin monkey, who reportedly worked as one of the monkeys on the Pirates of the Caribbean films.

== Critical reception ==
Mark Lawson of The Guardian praised the book as "a novel highlighted the book's portrayal of Florida, writing that "the greatest pleasure is the feeling that, through long residency and his journalistic beat, Hiaasen owns this location". He also praised it for keeping the author from "becoming a prisoner of style and subject matter", adding that "he has escaped from the bondage of publishing concept and reader expectation to produce a novel that is as enjoyable to read as it seems to have been for him to write".

== Sequel ==
A sequel, Razor Girl, was published in 2016.

== Television adaptation ==
In August 2021, Warner Bros. Television announced the development of a television adaptation of the same name. It stars Vince Vaughn, Michelle Monaghan, Jodie Turner-Smith, Meredith Hagner, Natalie Martinez, and Rob Delaney. The series aired for ten episodes from August 14 to October 9, 2024 on Apple TV+.
