= Cornelius Stribling =

American rear admiral (1796–1880)

Cornelius Kinchiloe Stribling
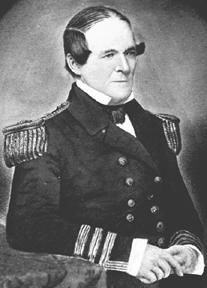
- Born: 22 September 1796; Pendleton, South Carolina, U.S.
- Died: 17 January 1880 (aged 83); Martinsburg, West Virginia, U.S.
- Burial place: Oak Hill Cemetery; Washington, D.C., U.S.
- Military career
- Branch: United States Navy
- Service years: 1812–1871
- Rank: Rear admiral
- Commands: United States Naval Academy; USS San Jacinto; Pensacola Navy Yard
- Conflicts: War of 1812; Second Barbary War; Mexican–American War; American Civil War

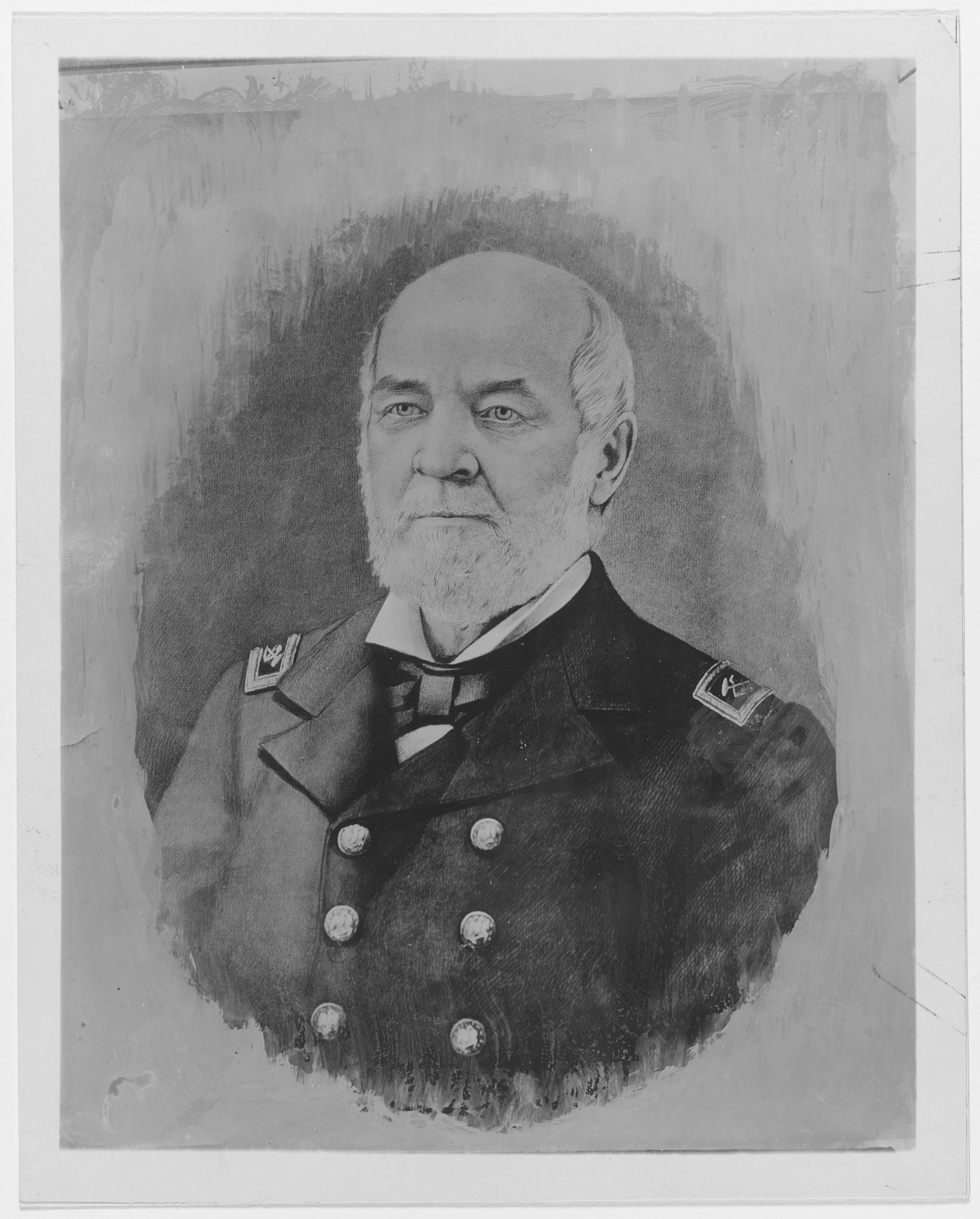
Stribling in his older years

Cornelius Kinchiloe Stribling (22 September 1796 – 17 January 1880) was a rear admiral in the United States Navy who served during the War of 1812, the Second Barbary War, the Mexican–American War, and the American Civil War.

== Biography ==
Stribling was born at Pendleton, South Carolina, and left home at the age of 15. He was appointed midshipman on 18 June 1812, the day the United States declared war on Great Britain. During the War of 1812, he served in Macedonian from 1 January 1813 to April 1814 and in Mohawk from then until April 1815. While assigned to Mohawk on Lake Ontario, Stribling participated in the blockade of Kingston in the summer and fall of 1814.

Soon after the end of the war, he returned to Macedonian and, in 1815, participated in the capture of two Algerine ships, a frigate and a brig, by Commodore Stephen Decatur's squadron. In October 1815, Stribling was transferred to Constellation and returned home in that frigate at the end of 1817. On 1 April 1818, he was promoted to lieutenant and served successively in Hornet, Peacock, and John Adams, and again in Constellation, during the campaigns against pirates in the West Indies. In 1823, he was given command of two barges along the coast of Cuba and with them captured buccaneer schooner Pilot after a running fight.

In 1835, he commanded the re-commissioned Peacock (1828) on her second diplomatic mission conveying diplomatist Edmund Roberts, accompanied by Lieutenant Commanding A. S. Campbell the U. S. Schooner Enterprise, both under the command of Commodore Edmund P. Kennedy, on the Commodore's way to establish the East India Squadron.

During the Mexican War, Stribling was attached to the ship-of-the-line Ohio and took part in operations against the coastal towns of Lower California and western Mexico. From 1850 to 1853, he served as Superintendent of the United States Naval Academy. On 1 August 1853, he was promoted to the rank of captain. From 1854 to 1855, he commanded San Jacinto and, between 1857 and 1859, he was Commandant at the Pensacola Navy Yard.

After two years as Commander of the East India Squadron, Stribling returned home in 1861 to find the Union rent asunder by the Civil War. He supported the Union cause. Under the provisions of the Act of Congress, effective 21 December 1861, his long service required that he be placed upon the retired list. That action and a promotion to the rank of commodore took place on 2 August 1862.

The exigencies of war soon brought him back to active duty. He commanded the Philadelphia Navy Yard until 23 September 1864, when he was ordered to assume command of the East Gulf Blockading Squadron. He held this post for the duration of the war. On 6 August 1866, he was appointed to the Lighthouse Board and remained with that organization until 18 September 1871, having served as president of the board from 15 March 1869.

Rear Admiral Stribling died at Martinsburg, West Virginia, on 17 January 1880. He was buried at Oak Hill Cemetery in Washington, D.C.

== Namesakes and honors ==
- Two ships have been named USS Stribling in his honor.
- Stribling Walk, the central brick walkway of the United States Naval Academy, is also named for him. According to Naval Academy legend the walk has 11,880 bricks in it due to his death in January 1880.

== See also ==
- List of superintendents of the United States Naval Academy

Military offices
Preceded by George P. Upshur	Superintendent of United States Naval Academy; 1850–1853	Succeeded by Louis M. Goldsborough
Preceded by Josiah Tattnall III	Commander, East India Squadron; 20 November 1859–23 July 1861	Succeeded by Frederick K. Engle
