= Ecotage =

Sabotage for environmental reasons

Ecotage (/ˈikəˌtɑːʒ/ EE-kə-TAHZH), also called eco-sabotage or monkeywrenching, is sabotage carried out for environmental reasons. The term covers a wide range of direct-action tactics, including tree spiking, the disabling of construction or logging equipment, arson of buildings associated with environmentally damaging industries, deflation of tyres on sport utility vehicles, and the closing of valves on oil pipelines. Practitioners typically target property rather than people and have framed their actions as a form of defensive resistance against ecological destruction.

The word was popularised by Sam Love and David Obst in their 1972 anthology Ecotage!, which combined "ecology" and "sabotage". Although clandestine sabotage for environmental ends predates the term, ecotage entered the wider environmental movement in the 1970s and 1980s through the writings of Edward Abbey, whose 1975 novel The Monkey Wrench Gang inspired the founding of the radical group Earth First! and the publication of Dave Foreman's 1985 field guide Ecodefense. From the 1990s onwards, ecotage in the United States was associated with the Earth Liberation Front (ELF) and Animal Liberation Front (ALF), whose campaigns of arson became the focus of the Operation Backfire investigation by the Federal Bureau of Investigation.

The classification of ecotage is contested. Governments and industry groups in the United States have frequently described it as a form of eco-terrorism, and convictions of ecotage participants have, in several cases, carried a terrorism enhancement at sentencing. Activists, academics and a number of legal scholars dispute this framing, arguing that property destruction without intent to harm people falls outside conventional definitions of terrorism. In the 2020s, the debate has been renewed by Andreas Malm's book How to Blow Up a Pipeline (2021) and a corresponding wave of climate-related sabotage in Europe and North America.

== Cases ==
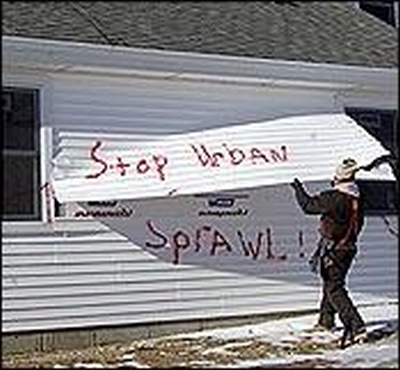
"Stop Urban Sprawl" was spray-painted on this multimillion-dollar house to protest the development. Mansions in the United States are a frequent target by the ELF.

All damage figures below are in United States dollars. Some well-known acts of ecotage have included:

- February 22, 1974 — Concerned about the planned Montague Nuclear Power Plant slated for construction in Montague, MA, activist Sam Lovejoy used a crowbar to topple a 550-foot weather monitoring tower at the future site. Lovejoy then turned himself in to police. The action sparked local resistance against the nuclear plant which led to its cancellation.
- Circa 1969 to 1985 – ecological activist James F. Phillips, operating covertly under the codename "The Fox", carried out a series of ecotage actions and subvertising campaigns against corporations that were polluting the Fox River in Illinois.
- 1998 – Arson of buildings at Vail Mountain in the United States by the ELF (Earth Liberation Front).
- March 11, 1999 – Genetically engineered potatoes uprooted at Crop and Food research centre in New Zealand.
- December 25, 1999 – In Monmouth, Oregon, fire destroyed the main office of the Boise Cascade logging company costing over $1 million ($1.9 million in 2025 dollars). ELF claimed responsibility.
- 2001 – Members of the ELF were prosecuted for setting off a firebomb that caused $7 million in damages ($14 million in 2025 dollars) at the University of Washington's Center for Urban Horticulture.
- August 1, 2003 – A 206-unit condominium being built in San Diego, California was burned down causing damage in excess of $20 million ($39 million in 2025 dollars). A 12-foot banner at the scene read "If you build it, we will burn it," signed, "The E.L.F.s are mad."
- August 22, 2003 – Arsonists associated with the ELF attacked several car dealerships in east suburban Los Angeles, burning down a warehouse and vandalizing over 100 vehicles, most of them SUVs or Hummers (chosen for their notoriously poor fuel efficiency) and causing over $1 million in damage ($1.8 million in 2025 dollars).
- 2016 - Activists from Climate Direct Action in the USA turned the emergency valves of 4 pipelines carrying oil to Canada causing the stop of up to 2.8 million barrels of oil a day. In the action the activists had to cause some property damage in order to access both the facilities and unlock the valves; they warned the present workers about what was going to happen.
- From 2016 to 2017 - Activists Jessica Reznicek and Ruby Montoya, were responsible for around 6 million dollars damages to the Dakota Access Pipeline (DAPL) construction sites and to the pipeline itself. Jessica Reznicek, was sentenced to 96 months imprisonment on June 30, 2021; Ruby Katherine Montoya was sentenced to 6 years.
- August 7, 2023 – Tyre extinguishers drilling holes in 60 SUVs in a Vertu Jaguar showroom in Exeter, Devon, UK for both social and environmental reasons.
- January 20, 2024 – Shut the System activists cut fiber optic cables to many insurance companies in the UK demanding them to immediately end all underwriting for fossil fuel expansion projects.

== In literature and popular culture ==
In their 1972 environmental-action book Ecotage!, Sam Love and David Obst claimed to have coined the word "ecotage" by combining "ecology" and "sabotage" to describe a "branch of tactical biology".

In fiction, the practice of ecotage was popularized in Edward Abbey's 1975 anarchistic novel The Monkey Wrench Gang and its sequel Hayduke Lives! (1990). It has also been treated in other novels including Carl Hiaasen's Tourist Season (1986) and Sick Puppy (2000), Neal Stephenson's Zodiac: The Eco-Thriller (1988), T. Coraghessan Boyle's A Friend of the Earth (2000), Dave Foreman's The Lobo Outback Funeral Home (2000), and Richard Melo's Jokerman 8 (2004). Radical depictions of environmental protection also inform major Native American novels including N. Scott Momaday's House Made of Dawn (1968), James Welch's Winter in the Blood (1974), and Leslie Marmon Silko's Ceremony (1977).

Several books written specifically for children and young adults have also explored radical responses to environmental endangerment including Carl Hiaasen's Hoot! (2002), Flush (2005), and Scat (2009), Claire Dean's Girlwood (2008), S. Terrell French's Operation Redwood (2011), and Silas House and Neela Vaswani's Same Sun Here (2012).

Ecotage is mentioned in the Mars trilogy of science fiction novels by Kim Stanley Robinson as a means of protest shown by the Red political party. Typically, the "Reds" would destroy terraforming ventures in an effort to slow the terraforming of Mars.

The Concrete miniseries Think Like a Mountain is centred about ecotage aimed to protect first growth forests in the Pacific Northwest.

Ecotage also informs movies such as Choke Canyon (1986) and On Deadly Ground (1994).

== Academic literature ==
In a 2024 article in the journal Ethical Theory and Moral Practice, Dylan Manson tries to develop a just war inspired theory that could justify defensive activism and hence ecotage: "The conscientious defensive activist can only engage in permissible eco-sabotage when she acts with just cause as constrained by necessity, with proportionality, with a reasonable chance of success, and without putting life at excessive risk." Manson makes then a distinction between anthropocentric and non-anthropocentric eco-tage and questions whether the real cases he brings meet or not the aforementioned moral criteria.

Thomas Young argued, in an article titled 'The Morality of Ecosabotage' published in the journal Environmental Values, that some arguments against ecosabotage cannot prove it always wrong and that there is some ground for a utilitarian justification of ecotage.

== See also ==
- Eco-terrorism
- Environmental movement
- Green Scare
- Operation Backfire (FBI)
- Radical environmentalism
- Vulkangruppe
