= Fallen Journalists Memorial Foundation =

U.S. nonprofit organization

- Abbreviation: FJM Foundation
- Formation: June 26, 2019 (7 years ago)
- Founders: David Dreier
- Type: Nonprofit organization 501(c)(3)
- Purpose: Establishment of a memorial on the National Mall in Washington, D.C., to commemorate journalists
- Headquarters: Washington, D.C., United States
- Key people: David Dreier
- Website: www.fallenjournalists.org

The Fallen Journalists Memorial Foundation (FJM Foundation) exists to construct a permanent memorial on the National Mall in Washington, D.C., to honor fallen journalists. The effort was launched as an initiative of the Tribune Publishing Company by its chairman, David Dreier, at the National Press Club Journalism Institute in June 2019. That marked the first anniversary of the deadliest assault against journalists in United States history. On June 28, 2018, a gunman killed five employees in the newsroom of Tribune's Capital Gazette in Annapolis, Maryland.

Dreier, who is a former senior member of the United States House of Representatives (1981–2013) and a longtime champion of press freedoms, has said that he looks forward to leading this multi-year effort to its completion.

The only memorial commemorating journalists located in Washington, D.C., resided at the Newseum, which closed at the end of 2019. Dreier has said that, in addition to the mass shooting at the Capital Gazette in 2018, the closing of the Newseum provided inspiration for the FJM project.

The Annenberg Foundation and the Michael and Jackie Ferro Foundation have provided initial funds for the FJM Foundation.

== Legislation ==
The enactment of federal legislation is required to authorize the establishment of a commemorative work in Washington, D.C. The approval of the National Capital Memorial Advisory Commission is required as well.

On June 25, 2019, a bipartisan and bicameral group of members of the United States Congress introduced the Fallen Journalists Memorial Act (H.R. 3465 and S. 1969), which would permit the construction of a Fallen Journalists Memorial in Area I (not including the "Reserve") or Area II of Washington, D.C., as depicted by U.S. National Park Service Map Number 869/86501 B dated June 24, 2003. This permissible area includes all of Washington, D.C. except the "Reserve" (shaded red on the map), which stretches from Lafayette Park neighboring the White House (north) to the Jefferson Memorial (south), and from the Capitol (east) to the Lincoln Memorial (west).

In accordance with the Commemorative Works Act of 1986, the FJM project will be funded with private donations.

=== Progress ===
On September 24, 2019, representatives from the FJM Foundation, including President Barbara Cochran, testified before the National Capital Memorial Advisory Commission in support of a permanent memorial to fallen journalists. The Commission tentatively voted to support the effort. On December 4, 2019, the House Natural Resources Subcommittee on National Parks, Forests, and Public Lands heard testimony on the memorial from Cochran and Representative Napolitano. On January 15, 2020, the House Committee on Natural Resources voted to advance the Fallen Journalists Memorial Act so that the legislation will be considered by the full House of Representatives.

On September 21, 2020, the House of Representatives passed the Fallen Journalists Memorial Act, originally sponsored by Representatives Grace Napolitano (D-California) and Tom Cole (R-Oklahoma). On December 2, 2020, the Senate passed the Fallen Journalists Memorial Act, originally sponsored by Senators Rob Portman (R-Ohio) and Ben Cardin (D-Maryland). On December 23, 2020, President Donald Trump signed the Fallen Journalists Memorial Act into law.

The foundation has announced that it plans to seek a location for the memorial in Area I, adjacent to the National Mall and the U.S. Capitol. In September 2022, U.S. Secretary of the Interior Deb Haaland recommended that Congress allow the foundation to consider sites in Area I. The Consolidated Appropriations Act, 2023 approved a location for the memorial in Area I. The intended location is at 3rd Street and Independence Avenue SW between the Voice of America building and the National Museum of the American Indian.

On March 13, 2024, the foundation announced that Chicago-based architect John Ronan will design the memorial, which will utilize "transparent materials to convey themes of clarity and light to reinforce the importance of the work of journalists," according to foundation chairman David Dreier.

== Board of advisors ==
- Wallis Annenberg – Annenberg Foundation
- Dean Baquet – The New York Times
- Bret Baier – Fox News
- Willow Bay – USC Annenberg School for Communications and Journalism
- Amanda Bennett – Voice of America (VOA)
- Wolf Blitzer – CNN
- Tom Brokaw – NBC News
- Christopher Dolan – The Washington Times
- Major Garrett – CBS News
- Donald Graham – Graham Holdings Company
- Hugh Hewitt – Salem Radio Network
- Brit Hume – Fox News
- Al Hunt – formerly Bloomberg News and The Wall Street Journal
- Rick Hutzell – The Baltimore Banner, formerly Capital Gazette Communications
- Alberto Ibargüen – John S. and James L. Knight Foundation
- Dr. John L. Jackson Jr. – Annenberg School for Communication at the University of Pennsylvania
- Tom Johnson – formerly CNN and Los Angeles Times
- Jonathan Karl - ABC News
- Cinny Kennard – Wallis Annenberg Legacy Foundation
- David Hume Kennerly – former White House photographer
- Alison Fitzgerald Kodjak – NPR (National Public Radio)
- Andrea Mitchell – NBC News
- Matt Murray – The Wall Street Journal
- Jan Neuharth – Freedom Forum, Freedom Forum Institute, and Newseum
- Clarence Page – Chicago Tribune
- Norman Pearlstine – Los Angeles Times
- Christopher Ruddy – Newsmax Media
- Tom Rosenstiel – American Press Institute
- Bob Schieffer – formerly CBS News
- Gerald F. Seib – The Wall Street Journal
- Joel Simon – Committee to Protect Journalists
- Catherine Merrill Williams – Washingtonian Media
- Judy Woodruff – PBS NewsHour
