= Hiaasen =

Hiaasen is a surname. Notable people with the surname include:

- Carl Hiaasen (born 1953), American writer
- Rob Hiaasen (1959–2018), American journalist and editor
