= Chomp (novel) =

2012 novel by Carl Hiaasen

- Original cover
- Author: Carl Hiaasen
- Language: English
- Genre: adventure comedy
- Published: 2012 Alfred A. Knopf
- Publication place: United States
- Media type: Print (book)
- Pages: 290
- ISBN: 978-0375-96842-6

Chomp is a young adult novel by Carl Hiaasen first published in 2012, and set in Hiaasen's native Florida. It is his fourth young adult novel. His previous three, also about Florida wildlife, are Hoot, Flush and Scat.

== Plot summary ==
Wahoo Cray and his father, Mickey Cray, a professional animal wrangler, are hired to help with the latest episode of a reality television series titled Expedition Survival! As Mickey received a serious concussion shortly before, Wahoo accepts for both of them while his mother is on a business trip.

In addition to helping with the animals, Wahoo has to restrain his father, who becomes dangerously short-tempered while dealing with the show's flabby and obnoxious star, Derek Badger, who has little experience with nature and no interest in learning.

While buying supplies, the Crays are joined by Tuna Gordon, a teenage classmate of Wahoo's, fleeing her abusive, alcoholic father, Jared Gordon. Unsure what else to do, Wahoo invites her to join them on their camping trip into the Everglades.

Predictably, the shoot in the Everglades is a series of fiascoes. Derek's clumsiness leads him to suffer a number of injuries. Tuna, originally a huge fan of Expedition: Survival!, is dispirited to learn just how fake the show and Derek are; for instance, his trademark parachute entrance into the wilderness is performed by a stuntman, and between shooting sessions, he is airlifted by helicopter to a luxury hotel.

One night, a lightning storm has grounded the helicopter and forced Derek to camp with the rest of the crew. Derek improvises a scene of eating a bat, but it bites his tongue and Mickey has to remove the creature without further mutilating Derek.

The next morning, Derek disappears, hijacking one of the airboats ferrying the crew and their equipment and driving wildly into the swamp. Derek has lapsed into a semi-delirious state as a result of infection from the bat bite; combined with a secret love for horror movies, he now believes he is in danger of turning into a vampire.

The show's crew organizes a search party, and things get further complicated when Jared Gordon appears, having tracked down his daughter. In terror, she jumps onto one of the search airboats and pleads with its driver, Link, to help her hide. Wahoo joins her, but Jared Gordon takes Mickey captive and shoots at the airboat as it is pulling away, seriously wounding Link. Jared then hijacks another airboat to follow them, taking Mickey along as a hostage.

While Mickey steers the hijacked airboat on an aimless course through the swamp, ensuring that Jared Gordon doesn't get near the kids, Wahoo and Tuna plan. When their airboat dies, they search the island they landed on and happen upon Derek, half-delirious. They try to bail out the half-sunken airboat Derek stole, but Derek quickly collapses from exhaustion.

Wahoo and Link are briefly separated from Tuna, when Jared Gordon finally finds her. Knowing the police are now after him, Gordon demands that Mickey drive him and Tuna out of the swamp and help them escape. Mickey refuses to let Tuna go with her abusive father, so Gordon shoots him in the foot. When Link appears, demanding the return of his airboat, Gordon takes aim with his gun, and Wahoo jumps him. Gordon throws Wahoo aside, but then Derek charges out of the trees and, still delirious, overpowers Gordon by biting his neck ferociously, like a vampire. Gordon is tied up when the search parties finally arrive, rushing Mickey and Link to the hospital and arresting Gordon. Wahoo and Tuna both thank Derek for his heroism, and Tuna asks for an autograph.

A few months later, the Everglades episode of Expedition: Survival! is broadcast to an enormous audience, thanks to the publicity about Derek's heroic actions in the swamp. However, Derek's contract with the show is not renewed after he foolishly tries to leverage this publicity to demand a higher salary, and he is replaced.

Thanks to some veiled threats from Wahoo's older sister, a lawyer, the show's producers agree to pay Mickey and Wahoo the full amount promised for their services. Wahoo receives a phone call from Tuna, who is now living with her mother, Gordon's estranged wife, in Chicago. Neither of them is looking forward to testifying at Gordon's criminal trial, but Tuna promises that, regardless, she and her mother will be visiting Florida again. They promise to meet up again soon, addressing each other by the nicknames they pinned on each other during the adventure.

== References to actual history, science, and current events ==
- Mickey named his son after Edward "Wahoo" McDaniel, his favorite pro wrestler; Wahoo finds the name awkward, since it also belongs to a species of saltwater fish.
- Derek Badger is originally from Canada, but on Expedition: Survival! he uses a fake Australian accent, deliberately copied from Steve Irwin.
- Derek complains that his favorite caterers are not available, and asks suspiciously whether they are cooking for Bear Grylls, another television survivalist; many of the "fake" aspects of Expedition: Survival! are parodies of Grylls's show, Man vs. Wild:
  - Grylls is famous for eating live animals on camera, though it is doubtful he actually needs to do so in order to survive;
  - Grylls is accompanied by a camera crew, meaning he is never actually lost or in real danger;
  - During some of his "wilderness" shoots, Grylls stayed in nearby hotels in between shooting seasons;
  - Several of the "survival constructs" that Grylls used were built by the crew or local craftsmen, instead of Grylls himself;
  - The producers of Man vs. Wild later included an advisory message before each episode, clarifying that Grylls's on-camera actions were meant to be informative, and the audience was not expected to believe that he was actually lost or in real danger.
- The producer of Expedition: Survival! remarks that it is good for the show's publicity for the audience to be worried about Derek being lost in the Everglades, reminding Raven that the survivors of the 2010 Copiapó mining accident "were total rock stars" after surviving their ordeal.
- Derek's favorite vampire movies, The Night Wing Trilogy, are based on a series of books which were poorly reviewed but nonetheless wildly popular; it appears to be a thinly veiled parody of Stephenie Meyer's Twilight series, which were likewise made into a series of films.
- Tuna has a passion for taxonomy, the scientific naming of plants and animals founded in part by Carl Linnaeus.

== Maturity and reading level ==
Common Sense Media rates Chomp as appropriate for ages 12+.
