= Sick Puppy =

2000 novel by Carl Hiaasen

- First edition
- Author: Carl Hiaasen
- Cover artist: Ross McDonald
- Language: English
- Publisher: Alfred A. Knopf
- Publication date: February 2000
- Publication place: United States
- Media type: Print (Hardback & Paperback)
- Pages: 352
- ISBN: 0-679-45445-4
- OCLC: 41565087
- Dewey Decimal: 813/.54 21
- LC Class: PS3558.I217 S53 2000
- Preceded by: Lucky You
- Followed by: Basket Case

Sick Puppy is a 2000 novel by Carl Hiaasen.

== Plot summary ==
Robert Clapley, a former drug smuggler-turned-real estate developer, plans to build high-rise condominia on Toad Island, home to a large population of oak toads. The project requires the construction of a massive new bridge to the mainland to accommodate Clapley's cement trucks. On the recommendation of the corrupt Florida Governor Richard "Dick" Artemus, to whom he has given large campaign contributions, Clapley hires lobbyist Palmer Stoat to expedite government funding for the bridge construction. By random happenstance, Stoat becomes subject to the obsessive wrath of ecoterrorist Twilly Spree after he witnesses him litter the highway from his luxury Range Rover. Twilly tracks Stoat back to the Fort Lauderdale residence he shares with his wife, Desirata.

Twilly arranges ironic pranks–hijacking a garbage truck and dumping its load into Desi's convertible, and filling Stoat's Range Rover with dung beetles–but is aggravated when Stoat continues to litter. When he breaks into Stoat's home, he is confronted by his massive Labrador Retriever and by Desi herself. Desi, who is increasingly unhappy with her marriage, tells Twilly that he is "aiming low" if he is trying to correct Stoat's misbehavior. She guides him to Toad Island, where Clapley's construction crew has deliberately buried thousands of oak toads to avoid later protest by environmentalists. Twilly orders Desi to tell Stoat that he will kill the dog if he doesn't stop the bridge project. Stoat dismisses the threat until Twilly sends him a roadkill Labrador's severed ear via FedEx. The actual dog becomes Twilly's companion after he changes his name to "McGuinn."

Stoat convinces Artemus to veto funding for the bridge but has no intention of letting the project fail. He tells Clapley and Artemus that the funding can be put back into the budget later, through a special session of the Florida legislature. Clapley sends a hit man, Mr. Gash, to kill Twilly, while Artemus, in an effort to avoid the project being tainted by a violent death, locates ex-governor Clinton Tyree, a.k.a. "Skink," who vanished in the mid-1970s after a short term of office and is said to be hiding in the remaining Florida wilderness. Artemus knows that Skink's mentally disturbed elder brother, Doyle, is still on the state's payroll as the keeper of an abandoned lighthouse and threatens to put him on the street if Skink doesn't apprehend Twilly. Artemus fails to realize the dire consequences of threatening Skink, or of putting him and Twilly in contact with each other.

Desi becomes attracted to Twilly, and the two eventually develop a relationship. Stoat is disgusted and washes his hands of her and McGuinn, telling Twilly that the bridge is going up no matter what he does. A violent confrontation with Twilly, Desi and Skink on Toad Island leaves Mr. Gash mortally wounded. Twilly is left in Skink's care while Desi returns to her parents' home in Atlanta. Despite her pleadings, Twilly is still committed to stopping the Toad Island project. Accompanied by Skink, Twilly trails Stoat, Clapley and Artemus to a private canned hunting reserve in northern Florida, where Stoat has arranged for Clapley to shoot a black rhinoceros and win over Willie Vasquez-Washington, a crucial member of the Florida House who is opposed to the special session.

Twilly is on the verge of shooting Clapley, but McGuinn runs into the preserve and nips playfully at the rhino's tail. The rhino–so ancient that it has hardly moved since it arrived at the ranch–goes berserk and charges at the hunting party. Clapley is gored to death on the rhino's horn, and Stoat is trampled flat. Artemus escapes the chaos but is mortified to learn that Willie snapped photos of the fiasco. Clapley's death dooms the Toad Island project. Apart from his many lobbying clients and crony politicians, only a few friends and family members show up at Stoat's funeral. Desi is among the mourners, during which she is approached by McGuinn, holding a note with Twilly's new address on it. Meanwhile, Twilly and Skink are driving along the highway when they see another group of litterbugs. They immediately agree they have to teach them a lesson.

== Characters in "Sick Puppy" ==
- Twilly Spree: college dropout, millionaire, protagonist
- Palmer Stoat: lobbyist and political fixer
- Desirata Stoat: Palmer's trophy wife
- Robert Clapley: retired drug smuggler, now real-estate developer
- Richard "Dick" Artemus: Governor of Florida
- Lisa June Peterson: Governor Artemus's executive assistant
- Willie Vasquez-Washington: Vice Chairman of the Florida House Appropriations Committee
- Katya and Tish: Clapley's girlfriends, his planned future Barbie Twins
- Estella: a call girl who only services registered Republicans
- Mr. Gash: Clapley's hired killer
- Clinton Tyree: former governor of Florida
- Lt. Jim Tile: Tyree's best friend and former bodyguard, an officer of the Florida Highway Patrol
- Nils Fishback: the "Mayor" of Toad Island
- Roger Roothaus: owner of the construction company developing Toad Island
- Karl Krimmler: construction project supervisor on Toad Island
- Dr. Steven Brinkman: staff biologist employed by Roger Roothaus
- Boodle/McGuinn: Palmer's Labrador Retriever;

== Major themes ==
Although some of the themes of the novel may suggest an autobiographical element the author himself shrugs off at least one aspect of this parallel. The main character Twilly and himself both had attorney forebears who lived in Southern Florida, but the development in this area came as a surprise to him and his attorney father and grandfather.

Now you have land use attorneys whose job it is to get around master plans and zoning restrictions, and they make good livings off finding loopholes or making loopholes so people can build something where they weren't intended to build it. A good example is Key West. . . . They live off the Hemingway mystique, they trade on the Hemingway mystique, constantly. If Hemingway were alive, he'd take a flame-thrower to Duval Street, and that's the truth. Fifty T-shirt shops? Give me a break.

== Allusions to actual history, science, and current events ==
- One of Stoat's most annoying (to his wife) habits is using snippets from classic rock songs in everyday conversation, especially because he always gets the lyrics wrong:
  - "I read the newspaper today, oh boy." (A Day in the Life by The Beatles)
  - "Come on, baby, light my candle." (Light My Fire by The Doors)
  - "I'm having a tough day's night." (A Hard Day's Night by The Beatles)
  - "You're thick as a stick." (Thick as a Brick by Jethro Tull)
  - "Blond sugar, like the song says." (Brown Sugar by The Rolling Stones)
  - "He's a no-place man." (Nowhere Man by The Beatles)
  - "Wouldn't It Be Great" (Wouldn't It Be Nice by The Beach Boys)
  - "Happiness is a hot gun." (Happiness Is a Warm Gun by The Beatles)
  - "You can't always do who you want." (You Can't Always Get What You Want by The Rolling Stones)
- Krimmler, Clapley's project manager, justifies his decision to bury the oak toad habitat on the island by referring to the Snail darter controversy.
- Twilly renames Stoat's dog after guitarist Roger McGuinn, one of the founding members of The Byrds. Several years after the book's publication, McGuinn himself met Hiaasen at a book signing and thanked him for the tribute.
- Palmer blames Desi's aversion to cigar smoking on then-President Bill Clinton, "and his twisted bimbos," a reference to Monica Lewinsky's allegation that Clinton penetrated her with a cigar tube.
- Skink humiliates Governor Artemus inside the executive mansion in a way that reminds Artemus of the fate of Ned Beatty's character in the film Deliverance.
- A subplot of the novel is based on Stoat's, and later Clapley's, obsession with the use of rhinoceros horns as an aphrodisiac.
- In a 2010 interview with Bloomberg News about his later novel Star Island, Hiaasen said of Sick Puppy, "I thought I'd invented the most despicable lobbyist ever, and then Jack Abramoff comes along and makes my guy look like the Dalai Lama."
- The novel's title - Sick Puppy - alludes to the narrator of the David Foster Wallace short story Girl with Curious Hair from the eponymous short story collection. The themes of the book, including the overlaps between violent nihilism and establishment politics, are also explored by Wallace in his work.

== Literary significance and criticism ==
Sick Puppy has been reviewed well and one example describes Hiaasen's skills thus.

Hiaasen is best known for serving up heaping helpings of just desserts [sic]. His bad guys are the baddest, and his good guys are anything but the Dudley Dorights of popular fiction. How does Hiaasen come up with his new means of doling out justice to the terminally greedy? Just when you think, "they'll never get out of this mess," he devises a plan, and they're off and running.

Other reviews praised the novel's harder edges.

Sick Puppy is ultimately as unforgiving as nature's order. The characters are not likeable. There is no redemption or apology. But that's Hiaasen's design. In the end, we are treated to one of his favorite devices, the epilogue with thumbnail descriptions of the fates of many of his characters. Some of the scoundrels prosper, some don't. There's the sense that there is more work to be done. Sure, Hiaasen himself may not be ready to kidnap the dogs of unregenerate litterbugs or clobber drunken jet skiers, but it's the thought that counts.

In his review of Hiaasen's later novel Skinny Dip, Michael Grunwald made several references to the characters of Sick Puppy:

Carl Hiaasen is South Florida's literary proctologist: he examines the region's assholes. The rapacious villains of Hiaasen's crime novels do not just commit murder, extortion, assault, fraud, and every conceivable variety of larceny; they also park in handicapped spaces, cheat on their trophy wives, tell racist jokes, flaunt their wealth in unusually obnoxious ways, and mangle the lyrics to good rock-and-roll songs. They do not just do bad things, like steal wheelchairs, shoot cops, and scam retirees; they are bad people, "maggots," "vermin," "cretins," "sleazeballs," "sewer scum," "reprobates," "whorehoppers." They care more about their golf games than their families, and more about money than anything else on earth. They drive Range Rovers with "COJONES" on their vanity plates. They don't listen and they don't learn.

== Cultural influence ==
- The title of the book inspired the name of Australian rock band Sick Puppies.

== See also ==
- T. Coraghessan Boyle's novel A Friend of the Earth is a slightly more serious treatment of ecoterrorism and ecotage.
- Henry Adams's novel Democracy discusses similar politics during the late 19th century.
- Lobbying in the United States

== Continuity ==
- This book is the fourth appearance of Hiaasen's recurring character Clinton Tyree, aka Skink, who was first introduced in Double Whammy.
- Twilly Spree reappears in Hiaasen's books Skinny Dip, Fever Beach, and Scat.
- One of Palmer's lobbying clients, mentioned in passing, is a United States Congresswoman wishing to reward sugar company executives who have "persuaded their Jamaican and Haitian cane pickers to donate generously - well beyond their means, in fact - to [her] reelection account." This scam - using the names of migrant workers to cover illegal hard money donations - was also used by the sugar cane industry to support the corrupt Congressman Dilbeck in Hiaasen's novel Strip Tease.
- Palmer Stoat, in one of his many malapropisms, mis-quotes the Jethro Tull song "Thick as a Brick" by using the word "stick" instead. Hiaasen used the same malapropism in the title of a January 5, 2018, column for the Miami Herald, written as a mock apology letter from Steve Bannon to then-President Donald Trump, attempting to explain away some of the statements attributed to Bannon in Michael Wolff's book Fire and Fury, including his description of Trump's daughter Ivanka, appointed her father's Advisor, as "dumb as a brick."
