= Basket Case =

Basket Case may refer to:

== Books ==
- The Basket Case, novel by Ralph McInerny
- Basket Case (novel), a 2002 crime novel by Carl Hiaasen

== Film and TV ==
- Basket Case (film), a 1982 American comedy horror film by Frank Henenlotter
- "Basket Case" (Magnum, P.I.), a 1983 TV episode

== Music ==
- "Basket Case" (song), a 1994 song by Green Day
- "Basketcase", a 1994 song by Compulsion
- "Basket Case", a song by Danger Doom from their 2005 album, The Mouse and the Mask
- "Basket Case", a song by Mondo Generator from their 2006 album, Dead Planet
- "Basket Case", a song by Sara Bareilles from her 2010 album, Kaleidoscope Heart
- "Basket Case", a song by Warren Zevon from his 2002 album, My Ride's Here
