= Skinny Dip (novel) =

2004 caper novel by Carl Hiaasen

- First edition cover
- Author: Carl Hiaasen
- Language: English
- Genre: Novel
- Publisher: Alfred A. Knopf
- Publication date: 2004
- Publication place: United States
- Media type: Print (hardback and paperback)
- Pages: 355 pp (first edition, hardback)
- ISBN: 0-375-41108-9 (first edition, hardback)
- OCLC: 54349637
- Dewey Decimal: 813/.54 22
- LC Class: PS3558.I217 S575 2004
- Preceded by: Basket Case
- Followed by: Nature Girl

Skinny Dip is a caper novel by Carl Hiaasen first published in 2004. It is his 11th work of fiction for adult readers. It is his fifth book featuring the character known as "Skink" and his second novel including the character Mick Stranahan, a former detective. It involves a murder plot and a subsequent attempt to exact revenge against the backdrop of a threat to Florida's Everglades National Park.

== Plot introduction ==
Set in South Florida in the course of April 2003, it is about a woman, Joey Perrone, who takes revenge on her cheating husband after he has tried to murder her. It is also one of Hiaasen's more topical novels, since the plot also revolves around the ongoing restoration of the Everglades to a natural habitat.

=== Explanation of the novel's title ===
A skinny-dipper is someone who swims in the nude, thus showing all their skin. Skinny Dip refers to the fact that when Joey Perrone is thrown overboard the impact when hitting the surface of the water tears off all her clothes so that on the following morning her rescuer finds her not only completely exhausted but also stark naked. Also, throughout the novel people find themselves in embarrassing situations due to their – occasionally inexplicable – nakedness.

== Plot summary ==
Charles Regis "Chaz" Perrone is a young marine biologist who has devoted his life solely to the lazy pursuit of a hedonistic existence. His insatiable greed drives him to collude with Samuel Johnson "Red" Hammernut, a crooked farm tycoon who owns large vegetable fields north of the Florida Everglades, which he relentlessly pollutes with fertilizer run-off. Officially employed by the state authorities to test swamp water for pollutants, Chaz is secretly on Red's payroll, forging the test results and allowing Red to avoid facing any regulatory measures.

One day, Chaz's wife Joey returns home unexpectedly while he is filling in the doctored figures on a chart. As she has never taken any interest in his work, Joey has no idea what Chaz is doing. However, Chaz is so paranoid that he suddenly fears that she might report him and begins to meticulously plan a way to kill her. For their second wedding anniversary, Chaz invites Joey on a cruise and throws her overboard while they are out to sea. Being an experienced swimmer, Joey survives by managing to turn her fall into a dive and swims toward the coast. As her strength gives out, she clings to a floating bale of marijuana for several hours.

The next morning, Joey is rescued by Mick Stranahan, a former investigator with the State Attorney who was forced into early retirement. Mick lives on a small island in Biscayne Bay owned by a successful but aging Mexican novelist. Mick is now in the novelist's pay as a caretaker, leading a solitary life guarding the island. When Joey is presumed dead back on the mainland, Chaz pretends to be a grieving husband. As no witnesses come forward, the authorities accept his suggestion that Joey either had an accident or committed suicide. Karl Rolvaag, a Broward County detective investigating the disappearance, is suspicious of Chaz's mannerisms but can find no motive supporting a suspicion of murder.

Joey is equally baffled and begs Mick not to report that she is still alive. Since she has no idea yet why Chaz tried to kill her, she doubts that she can convince the police that it was anything besides attempted murder. Instead, she decides to drive her husband to confess by exploiting his vanity and paranoia; Mick agrees with the plan. Joey starts by entering their house while Chaz is at work and leaving traces of herself – negligees and a photo of the couple with her face cut out. Chaz is unsettled enough by these clues that he experiences erectile dysfunction, leaving him greatly flustered. Joey happens to be hiding under the bed when Chaz returns unexpectedly with one of his girlfriends and fails to have sex with her.

Worried by Chaz's reports of a home intruder, Red orders one of his employees, an illiterate, heavy-set man called Earl Edward "Tool" O'Toole, to act as Chaz's bodyguard. As Chaz's mental state deteriorates, his job description changes to "babysitter" to prevent Chaz from exposing Red. Tool, a fentanyl addict, visits nursing homes and steals fentanyl skin patches off elderly patients' bodies. During one of these expeditions he meets Maureen, a dying woman he befriends.

Joey and Mick soon develop a sexual relationship and plan more sophisticated acts of revenge. Mick has the idea of pretending to blackmail Chaz by inventing a witness to Joey's murder. Chaz is unnerved when a mysterious phone caller seems to know every detail of Joey's "death," concluding that only Karl could know so much about it. He confronts Karl with his accusation, leading the baffled detective to become even more suspicious of Chaz. Mick also recruits his brother-in-law, a corrupt lawyer, to draft a fake will leaving Joey's entire fortune to Chaz. Delivering this to Chaz and to the police has the double effect of playing on Chaz's greed while energizing the stagnating investigation.

Chaz's judgment deteriorates even further, and he erroneously concludes that his current mistress, Ricca, is the blackmailer's girlfriend and accomplice. At gunpoint, he drives her out to the swamp at Loxahatchee where, in the dark, he fires at her. Though he only manages to wing her in the leg, Ricca plunges into the water and seemingly drowns. Unbeknownst to Chaz, she survives and is rescued by a Vietnam veteran who lives in the Everglades. Both Mick and Karl, working independently, trace the bill of sale for Chaz's expensive Hummer to one of Red's companies, and patient investigation leads them to discover the Everglades scam.

Karl does not share his conclusions with his captain. There is no evidence directly linking the scam to Joey's disappearance, but Karl is confident that, in his paranoid state, Chaz will break down and confess to the scam to minimize his own punishment, while Red will foresee this and try to have Chaz eliminated. Karl has even discovered hints that Joey is still alive — her credit card has been used to buy women's clothes and accessories — but does not share this with Chaz.

Meanwhile, a few friends and relatives are let in on the truth and play along with Mick and Joey. Her brother Corbett, a reclusive sheep farmer in New Zealand, flies to Miami and hires a squadron of helicopters to buzz Chaz's Hummer on his way to the Everglades, then arranges a memorial service for Joey at which he is expected to give a speech. Chaz gets up to deliver a eulogy but collapses with fright when Ricca enters the church on crutches and sits next to Karl in the audience. Another of Joey's accomplices, a friend from her book club named Rose Jewell, approaches Chaz and offers to console him over dinner at her place. Expecting an easy lay, Chaz accepts the invitation, only to be drugged by Rose and put to sleep in her bed.

Only half awake, Chaz thinks he is hallucinating when he finds Joey sitting at his side asking him reproachfully why he tried to kill her. He confesses that he thought she had figured out his scam. She replies she had no idea what he was doing and calls him a monster. The following morning, Chaz wakes up from his drug-induced slumber sitting naked at the wheel of his Hummer, which has been parked on the shoulder of a busy road during rush hour. Later he receives a video allegedly recorded on the night of the murder, in which he clearly recognizes his wife although he can see himself only from behind. The cassette includes a message summoning him to a rendezvous to deliver the blackmail money.

Following the blackmailer's instructions, Chaz rents a small boat with an outboard motor and, together with Tool, drives to Stiltsville in the middle of a thunderstorm. Red, who has provided the money, has instructed Tool to kill Chaz before the meeting and return the suitcase to him. However, Tool has other plans: inspired by Maureen, he wants to abandon his life of crime, reform and become a respectable citizen. But before the blackmailers appear, Chaz shoots Tool, who falls into the water but survives. While Mick and Corbett pull Tool out of the water, Joey confronts her husband. She is tempted to shoot him but, following Mick's instructions, tells him to get lost. Chaz flees in the boat.

Chaz safely arrives at the mainland with the money and immediately drives home. His new plan is to compose a suicide note, disappear and start a new life in Costa Rica. Before he can leave, he is snatched out of his house by Red and Tool, hog-tied and driven to the Everglades, Red having concluded that the "blackmail" was just a con by Chaz to rip him off. When Red orders Tool to shoot Chaz, Tool deliberately misses and Chaz flees into the swamp. On the way home to Red's farm, the entrepreneur insults Tool, who takes revenge by killing him and impaling his body on the roadside.

Joey decides to stay with Mick on the island. Corbett takes an interest in Ricca and invites her to share some time in New Zealand. Karl closes the case and moves back to his native Minnesota. Tool is left with all the money, deciding to spend the first part of it on a veterinarian who removes two bullets from his body, and the second on a new pickup truck in which he embarks on a trip to Canada. He takes along Maureen, who he has rescued from the nursing home at her request, and wants to see the pelicans migrating. Chaz is picked up by the semi-deranged Vietnam veteran. In response to Chaz's limp inquiry about what happens next, the veteran replies, "Nature, red in tooth and claw."

== Discussion ==
Hiaasen's novels are often classified as "Crime Fiction" (or "environmental thrillers"), but they can also be read as satirical and comic mainstream novels depicting people in difficult and outrageous situations triggered by human weaknesses such as greed, lust, ignorance, or revenge.

=== Plot ===
In his review of Strip Tease, Donald E. Westlake commented that, at the center of all the wackiness was an accessible, touching storyline: a single mother's quest to rescue her young daughter from a reckless husband and an inadequate foster care system. Skinny Dip has at its center a wife who survives a murder attempt by her husband, and is driven not just by the need to get even, but to find out the reason he did it. This gives the novel more focus than some of Hiaasen's other books, which often involve the characters running across each other in random ways, or going on unplanned wanderings across Florida.

The other central plot is the fight to save the Everglades, and the role that the villains are playing in its destruction. Somewhere along the way, the two plot lines converge, and the quest to take revenge on Chaz becomes tied up with the aim of stopping Red's pollution.

In other words, the reader is offered a choice of which thing to root for: some readers may think that Chaz's betrayal of the environment for money makes him detestable, but trying to murder his wife is what makes him a true monster; other readers may think the exact opposite.

Skinny Dip is also enriched by a variety of subplots: Tool's gradual moral awakening, as he grows closer to a dying old lady who is too proud to admit that she has been abandoned by her family; Karl Rolvaag's longing for his native Minnesota, and his search for his escaped pet pythons; Chaz's obsession with sex and his desperate attempts to reverse the erectile dysfunction which is his only sign of guilt over Joey's murder, including experimenting with a black-market version of Viagra – "the Food and Drug Administration (FDA) definitely would not approve."; and finally, the suitcase full of money, which changes hands until it falls into the grip of the least likely person in the story.

The novel contains many scenes reminiscent of classic farces. For instance, at one point there are five people in the Perrone house, three of whom are trying to hide their presence from the other: at the center is Chaz and his "back-up" girlfriend Medea, with whom he has just unsuccessfully attempted sexual relations; hiding under the bed is Joey, caught in the middle of another infiltration of the house; Tool is in another part of the house, ordered to protect Perrone but ordered by him to stay out of the way of his date; and finally Mick, who enters in search of Joey and, when he encounters Tool, politely asks him if he's going to try to stop Mick. ("What a dumb-ass question. Of course I am.")

In a similar situation, Chaz, expecting sex with Rose, is drunk and drugged and lured into bed, not knowing that the woman he's groping for is in fact his wife.

Other funny situations arise out of Chaz's paranoia and ineptness as a killer. He imagines he's surrounded by enemies, but he always manages to look in the wrong direction. Even when the truth — for example, Joey — is right in front of him, he attributes it to hallucinations caused by the West Nile virus, rather than recognizing it for a sophisticated hoax.

=== Accuracy of environmental reporting ===
In his review of Skinny Dip for The New Republic, Washington Post reporter Michael Grunwald criticized the book as being too fictionalized, and potentially misleading, in describing the causes of the Everglades' ecological status. In Hiaasen's scenario, the Everglades are dying as a result of agricultural contaminants dumped by greedy corporate villains, aided and abetted by corrupt or complacent officials.

Grunwald maintains that the state effort to curtail agricultural pollution is separate from the Everglades Restoration Project, and had been largely successful even before the Project commenced in 2000. Instead, the biggest threat to the Everglades comes not from corporate pollution or corrupt officials, but rather from "John Q. Public" – the diversion of freshwater for South Florida's huge municipalities, and the normal waste products associated with such cities. Grunwald says that when conservation efforts should focus on curtailing the effects of public activity, it is misleading and dangerous to lay all the blame on "bad guys" personified by Red Hammernut and Chaz.

On the other hand, Grunwald agrees that it is "smart to be cynical" about Florida politics, "especially all the daily blathering about conserving our precious natural resources." A recurring theme in Grunwald's book, The Swamp, is that for the majority of Florida's history, the Everglades has been viewed as a hostile territory, a nuisance, or an obstacle to growth, and only very recently has perception changed to regard it as a place worth saving.

Hiaasen is also scathing about this in the chapter when he briefly summarizes the history of the Everglades, and how ninety percent of it has been destroyed through the course of South Florida's development:

Inevitably, the Everglades and all its resplendent wildlife began to die, but no one with the power to prevent it even considered trying. It was, after all, just a huge damn swamp.

But later, it became clear that the Everglades' health was linked to South Florida's drinking water, and if the Everglades died, then growth would stop dead:

This apocalyptic scenario was laid out before Florida's politicians, and in no time at all even the most slatternly among them was extolling the Everglades as a national treasure, that must be preserved at all costs.

== Continuity ==
- Mick Stranahan is the protagonist of Hiaasen's third novel Skin Tight.
- Other characters from Skin Tight also make brief appearances, including Mick's brother-in-law, crooked lawyer Kipper Garth, and Marine Patrol Officer Luis Cordova.
- Skinny Dip makes an oblique reference to Christina Marks, the female protagonist of Skin Tight, in confirming that Christina married Mick, and later divorced him.
- The hermit who rescues Ricca is "Skink" aka Clinton Tyree, a recurring character in Hiaasen's novels. The unnamed "intense young man" accompanying him is most likely Twilly Spree, the protagonist of Sick Puppy.
- In Hiaasen's book Stormy Weather, Skink takes another character to a stilt house in Biscayne Bay, saying that it used to be occupied by a former Investigator for the State Attorney's Office, who had "recently married a beautiful twelve-string guitarist and moved to the Island of Exuma." Assuming this is a reference to Mick, this is a slight discontinuity with Skinny Dip, in which he lists his number of ex-wives as six: the five mentioned in Skin Tight, plus Christina.
- Hiaasen's novels often feature a recurring joke that radiology is a "soft" medical discipline, and those that practice it are not "real" doctors. In this novel, Chaz's backstory explains that his original ambition was to go to medical school and become a radiologist, which struck him as an appealing way to become wealthy without "interacting with actual sick people," and leave him plenty of leisure time to maintain his sex life.
- In the book's opening chapter, Joey is disappointed to see that the cruise line's "private island" has been minimally altered since being acquired from its previous owner, a drug smuggler. In his non-fiction book Team Rodent: How Disney Devours the World, Hiaasen pointed out that Disney Cruise Line's inaugural trip plan featured a stop at "Castaway Cay", formerly Gorda Kay, the site of an illicit airstrip used for drug trafficking to South Florida.

== Adaptations ==
=== Audiobook ===
An audiobook version of Skinny Dip was released in 2004 by Books on Tape. The audiobook, read by Stephen Hoye, is unabridged and runs 13 hours and 30 minutes over 11 CDs. It was also released in an abridged version, read by Barry Bostwick, running 4 hours and 47 minutes.

=== Film and television ===
- On July 5, 2011, The Hollywood Reporter reported that HBO Networks was developing Skinny Dip for a film or miniseries.
- On February 28, 2018, Deadline reported that The CW was creating a Skinny Dip television series. The pilot episode, written by Russel Friend and Garrett Lerner, and directed by Marc Buckland, stars Matt Barr as Mick, Sarah Wright Olsen as Joey, and Ben Aldridge as Chaz Scenes for the pilot were filmed on location in New Orleans, Louisiana in April, 2018. The pilot was not picked up to series.
- On March 5, 2025, Variety reported that HBO Max will develop a 1-hour dramedy television series adaptation of Skinny Dip with Edward Kitsis & Adam Horowitz writing & executive producing with Bill Lawrence, who also produced the miniseries adaptation of Hiaasen's novel Bad Monkey. By December, the series had moved from HBO to Amazon, and Amanda Seyfried was cast as Joey.

== Reception ==
The bestseller was highly commended by Publishers Weekly stating that "his is vintage Hiaasen, with some wonderfully likable characters as well as his signature obnoxious heavies, and the plot is a delightful mixture of farce and suspense." While Kirkus reviewed it as "bitingly satirical, sublimely zany, and deeply satisfying."

== See also ==
- Draining and development of the Everglades
