= Chomp (disambiguation) =

Chomp is a two-player game played on a rectangular chocolate bar made up of smaller square blocks.

Chomp or CHOMP may also refer to:

== Arts and entertainment ==
=== Titled works ===
- Chomp (album) by Pylon
- Chomp (novel), by Carl Hiaasen
- C.H.O.M.P.S., a 1979 film directed by Don Chaffey

=== Fictional characters ===
- Chomp (Mario), or Chain Chomp, in the Mario video game series
- Chomp, in the arcade game Dinosaur King
- Chomp, a robot on BattleBots
- Chomp, mascot for Discovery Kids

== Other uses ==
- Biting
- Chomp (chocolate bar)
- Chomp (search engine)
- chomp, a Perl function; See Trimming
- Community Hospital of the Monterey Peninsula, California, US

== See also ==
- Chomp-Chomp, in Pac-Man
