= Carl Hiaasen =

American novelist (born 1953)

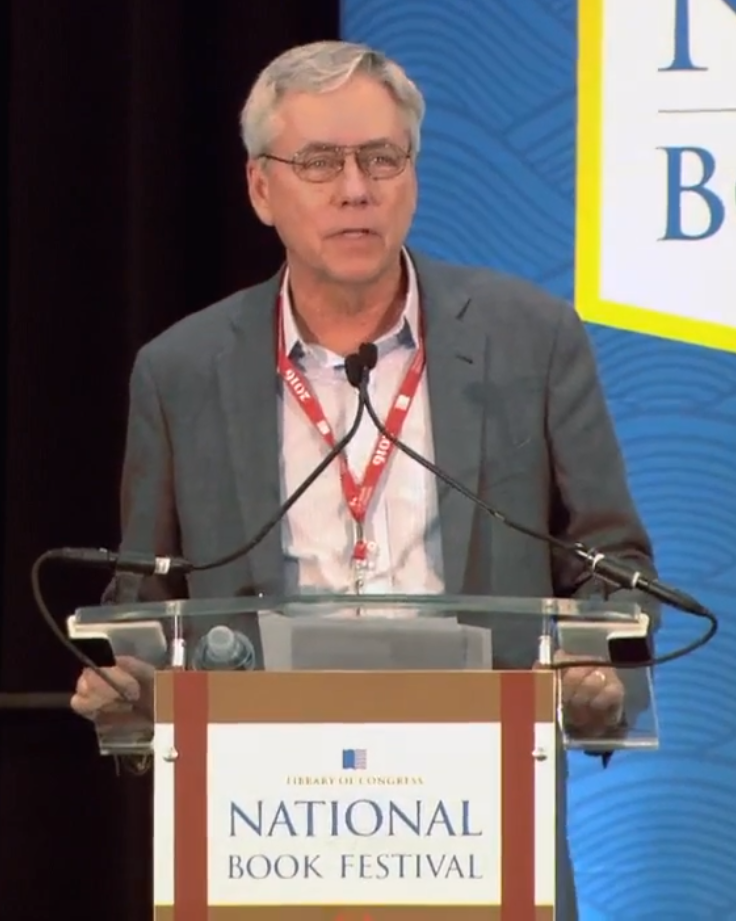
- Carl Hiaasen at the 2016 National Book Festival
- Born: March 12, 1953 (age 73); Fort Lauderdale, Florida, U.S.
- Education: Emory University; University of Florida
- Occupations: Author and journalist
- Spouse: Katie Fox (m. 2020)
- Relatives: Rob Hiaasen (brother)
- Writing career
- Period: 1974–Present (Retired from The Miami Herald in 2021)
- Genres: Crime fiction, thrillers, satirical fiction, children's fiction
- Subjects: Environmentalism, political corruption, fraudsters, Florida
- Notable awards: Heywood Broun Award from Newspaper Guild 1980; Ernie Pyle Lifetime Achievement Award from the National Society of Newspaper Columnists 2010; Newbery Honor from the Association for Library Service to Children 2003; Marjorie Harris Carr Award for Environmental Advocacy from the Florida Defenders of the Environment 2017
- Website: Official website

Carl Hiaasen (/ˈhaɪ.əsɛn/; born March 12, 1953) is an American journalist and novelist. He began his career as a newspaper reporter and by the late 1970s had begun writing novels in his spare time, both for adults and for middle grade readers. Two of his novels have been made into feature films, and two have been made into TV series.

Hiaasen's adult novels are humorous crime thrillers set in Florida. They feature casts of eccentric, sometimes grotesque characters and satirize aspects of American popular culture. Many of the novels include themes related to environmentalism and political corruption in his native state.

== Early life and education ==
Hiaasen was born in 1953 born to Odel and Patricia Hiaasen of Norwegian and Irish ancestry as the first of four children, including his brother Rob Hiaasen. Raised in Plantation, Florida, then a rural suburb of Fort Lauderdale, he started writing at age six when his father gave him a typewriter for Christmas. After graduating from Plantation High School in 1970, he entered Emory University, where he contributed satirical humor columns to the student newspaper The Emory Wheel. In 1972, he transferred to the University of Florida, where he wrote for The Independent Florida Alligator. Hiaasen graduated in 1974 with a degree in journalism.

== Journalism ==
Hiaasen was a reporter at TODAY (Cocoa, Florida) for two years before being hired in 1976 by the Miami Herald, where he worked for the city desk, Sunday magazine and award-winning investigative team. Hiaasen was a columnist for the newspaper from mid-1985 until he retired in March 2021. His columns have been collected in three published volumes, Kick Ass (1999), Paradise Screwed (2001) and Dance of the Reptiles (2014), all edited by Diane Stevenson.

His only brother was Rob Hiaasen, an editor and columnist at The Capital newspaper in Annapolis, Maryland, who was killed in the mass shooting at the newspaper's office on June 28, 2018. Carl Hiaasen's 1991 novel Native Tongue carries the dedication "For my brother Rob."

== Novelist ==
After becoming a reporter, Hiaasen began writing novels in his spare time. The first three were co-authored with his friend and fellow journalist William Montalbano: Powder Burn (1981), Trap Line (1982), and A Death in China (1984). His first solo novel, Tourist Season (1986), featured a group of ragged eco-warriors who kidnap the Orange Bowl Queen in Miami. The book's main character was whimsically memorialized by Jimmy Buffett in a song called "The Ballad of Skip Wiley", which appeared on his Barometer Soup album.

Twenty-one of Hiaasen's novels and nonfiction books have been on the New York Times Best Seller lists. His work has been translated into 34 languages. In 2016, his novel Razor Girl was shortlisted for the Bollinger Everyman Wodehouse Prize.

An earlier Hiaasen novel, Strip Tease, was adapted into the 1996 feature film Striptease starring Demi Moore and Burt Reynolds. Another book, Bad Monkey, has been adapted into a series on Apple TV. It stars Vince Vaughn and is written and executive produced by Bill Lawrence. The series began airing in August 2024. Bad Monkey has been renewed for a second season.

Hiaasen's first venture into writing for younger readers was the 2002 novel Hoot, which was named a Newbery Medal honor book. It was adapted as a 2006 film of the same name (starring Logan Lerman, Brie Larson and Luke Wilson). The movie was written and directed by Wil Shriner. Jimmy Buffett provided songs for the soundtrack, and appeared in the role of Mr. Ryan, a middle school teacher.

Hiaasen's subsequent children's novels are Flush; Scat; Chomp; Skink – No Surrender, which introduces one of his most popular adult characters to younger readers; Squirm; and the latest, Wrecker.

In 2014, Skink was longlisted for a National Book Award in Young People's Literature. Hiaasen's books for young readers feature environmental themes, eccentric casts and adventure-filled plots. Squirm, which is set in Florida and Montana, was published in fall 2018 and opened at #4 on the New York Times bestseller list for middle-grade novels.

Wrecker, released on September 26, 2023, is set in Key West during the COVID-19 pandemic. Kirkus Reviews called it, "A batten-down-the-hatches thriller anchored by critical real-life themes". Booklist wrote, "Wielding his writing talents and wit, Hiaasen seamlessly incorporates...disparate elements into one heck of a ride". Wrecker debuted at number one on The New York Times Children's Middle Grade Hardcover Best Sellers List.

His adult book, Squeeze Me, was published on August 25, 2020, and debuted at #2 on the New York Times Combined Print and E-Book Best Sellers List. The novel takes place during the glitzy Palm Beach social season, and features wild pythons and a fictional, well-fed U.S. president who has a vacation mansion on the island. Amazon and the Washington Post listed Squeeze Me among the best novels of 2020.

Fever Beach, his latest novel, was published on May 13, 2025, and opened at #8 on the New York Times Combined Print and E-Book Best Sellers List. It features the character Twilly Spree, who was introduced in 2000's Sick Puppy, and tells the story of two fumbling hate-mongers who are trying to start their own white nationalist group.

Hiaasen's most recent nonfiction work is Assume the Worst: The Graduation Speech You'll Never Hear, which was published in April 2018 and illustrated by Roz Chast, known for her cartoons in The New Yorker.

== Songwriting ==
During the 1990s, Hiaasen co-wrote the lyrics of three songs with his friend, L.A. rocker Warren Zevon. "Rottweiler Blues" and "Seminole Bingo" appeared on Zevon's Mutineer album in 1995. The third song they wrote together, "Basket Case," was done in conjunction with Hiaasen's novel of the same name, and appeared in 2002 on Zevon's album My Ride's Here.

Hiaasen co-wrote "Fish Porn" on Jimmy Buffett's final album, Equal Strain on All Parts, with Buffett and Mac McAnally.

== Personal life ==
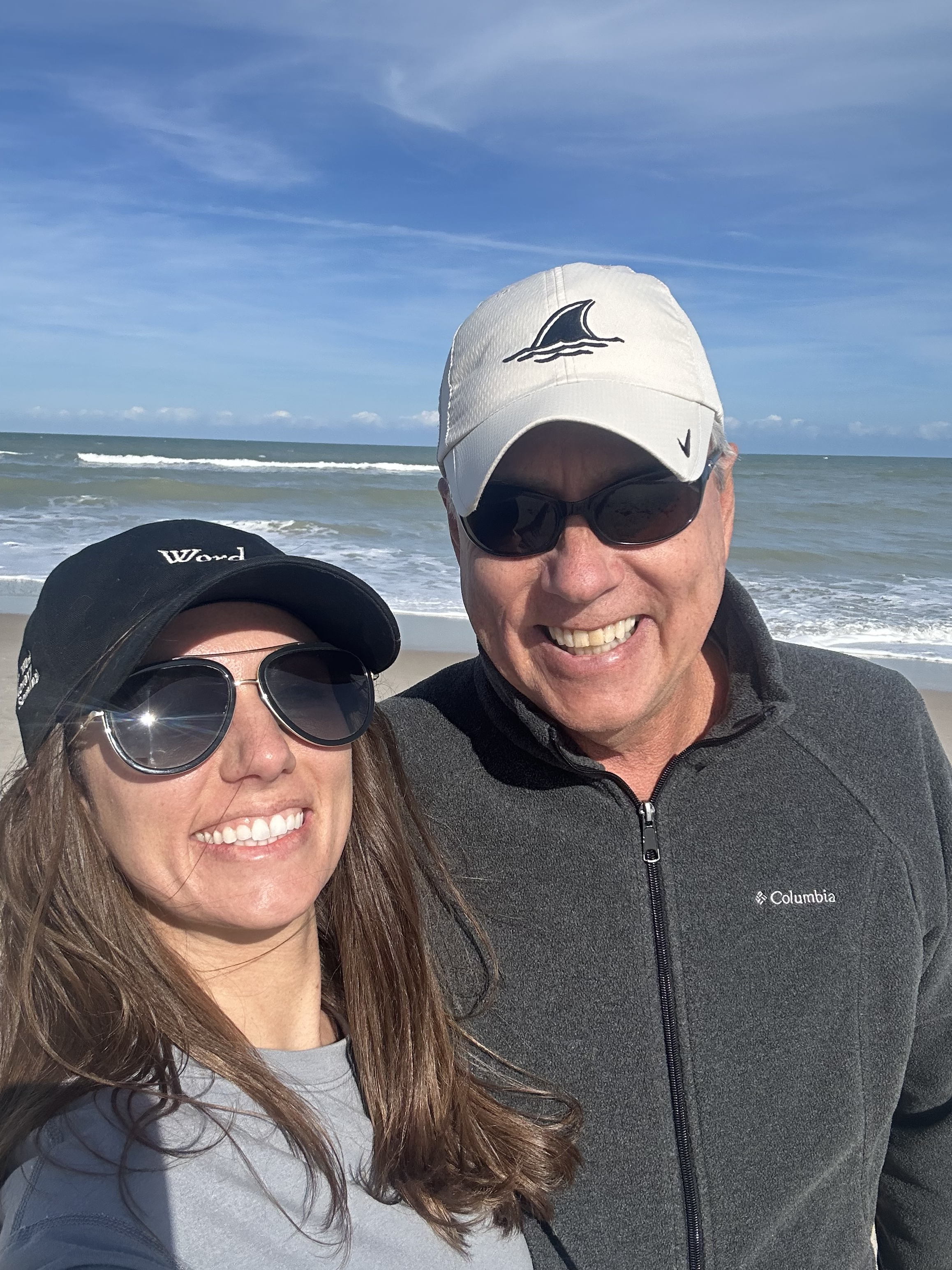
Carl and Katie Hiaasen

Hiaasen lives in Vero Beach, Florida. He is a fly fisherman who has won the Invitational Fall Fly Bonefish Tournament in Islamorada six times, fishing with guide Tim Klein. His wife is Katie Fox, whom he married in 2020. Hiaasen was previously married to Connie, a nurse, whom he thanks in the dedication for Skin Tight. Hiaasen married Connie when he was 17-years-old. The couple had one child and divorced after 26 years. Hiaasen then married Fenia Clizer, with whom he also shares one child.

== Works ==
=== Fiction ===
==== Adult fiction ====
- Tourist Season (1986)
- Double Whammy (1987)
- Skin Tight (1989)
- Native Tongue (1991)
- Strip Tease (1993)
- Stormy Weather (1995)
- Naked Came the Manatee (1996) (A Mystery Thriller Parody with 12 other authors)
- Lucky You (1997)
- Sick Puppy (2000)
- Basket Case (2002)
- Skinny Dip (2004)
- Nature Girl (2006)
- Star Island (2010)
- Bad Monkey (2013)
- Razor Girl (2016)
- Squeeze Me (2020)
- Fever Beach (2025)

With William Montalbano

- Powder Burn (1981)
- Trap Line (1982)
- A Death in China (1984)

==== Fiction for young readers ====
- Hoot (2002)
- Flush (2005)
- Scat (2009)
- Chomp (2012)
- Skink – No Surrender (2014)
- Squirm (2018)
- Wrecker (2023)

=== Short stories ===
- "Tart of Darkness" (2003, Sports Illustrated Swimsuit Issue)
- The Edible Exile (2013)

=== Non-fiction ===
- Team Rodent: How Disney Devours the World (1998)
- Kick Ass: Selected Columns (1999)
- Paradise Screwed: Selected Columns (2001)
- The Downhill Lie (2008)
- Dance of the Reptiles: Selected Columns (2014)
- Assume the Worst: The Graduation Speech You'll Never Hear (2018)

=== Collections ===
- A Carl Hiaasen (2000) (an audiobook set containing Tourist Season, Stormy Weather, and Strip Tease)

34 books in total

== Adaptations ==
Hiaasen's novels have been adapted for film and television:

- Striptease (1996), a feature film based on Strip Tease, starring Demi Moore and Burt Reynolds
- Hoot (2006), a feature film adapted from the eponymous children's novel, starring Logan Lerman, Brie Larson and Luke Wilson
- Skinny Dip (2018), an unaired television pilot dramatised from the eponymous novel, starring Matt Barr, Sarah Wright Olsen and Ben Aldridge
- Bad Monkey (2024–present), a television series from Bill Lawrence, starring Vince Vaughn
- RJ Decker (2026), a television series from Robert Doherty based on Double Whammy, starring Scott Speedman

== Awards and achievements ==
Journalist

- 1980: National Headliners Award from Sigma Delta Chi.
- 1980: Heywood Broun Award from Newspaper Guild.
- 2004: Damon Runyon Award from the Denver Press Club.
- 2010: Ernie Pyle Lifetime Achievement Award from the National Society of Newspaper Columnists.

Writer

- 2003: Newbery Honor from the Association for Library Service to Children, for Hoot.
- 2005: Rebecca Caudill Young Readers' Book Award, for Hoot.
- 2005: Dagger Awards Nominee – Best Novel, for Skinny Dip.
- 2009: Sélection prix Nouvel Obs et BibliObs du roman noir, for Croco-deal (Nature Girl).
- 2011: Prix du Livre Environnement de la Fondation Veolia Environnement – Mention jeunesse, for Panthère (Scat).
- 2011: Prix Enfantaisie du meilleur roman, for Panthère (Scat).
- 2012: Prix Barnes & Noble du meilleur roman jeunesse, for Chomp.
- 2013: Prix Science en toutes lettres from The Académie de Rouen, for Panthère (Scat).
- 2014: National Book Award for Young People's Literature Longlist, for Skink: No Surrender.
- 2017: Marjorie Harris Carr Award for Environmental Advocacy from the Florida Defenders of the Environment
