= Hoot (film) =

2006 film

- Theatrical release poster
- Directed by: Wil Shriner
- Screenplay by: Wil Shriner
- Based on: Hoot by Carl Hiaasen
- Produced by: Frank Marshall; Jimmy Buffett
- Starring: Luke Wilson; Logan Lerman; Brie Larson; Tim Blake Nelson; Neil Flynn; Robert Wagner
- Cinematography: Michael Chapman
- Edited by: Alan Edward Bell
- Music by: Jimmy Buffett
- Production companies: Walden Media; The Kennedy/Marshall Company
- Distributed by: New Line Cinema
- Release date: May 5, 2006
- Running time: 91 minutes
- Country: United States
- Language: English
- Budget: $15 million
- Box office: $8 million

Hoot is a 2006 American family comedy film, based on Carl Hiaasen's novel of the same name. It was written and directed by Wil Shriner, and produced by New Line Cinema and Walden Media. The film stars Luke Wilson, Logan Lerman, Brie Larson, Tim Blake Nelson, Neil Flynn and Robert Wagner. The film follows a group of children trying to save a burrowing owl habitat from destruction by a corrupt developer. The film features live burrowing owls and music by Jimmy Buffett. Buffett is also listed as a co-producer, and played the role of Mr. Ryan, the children's science teacher.

Filming took place from July to September 2005 in Florida, with additional shooting in California the following January. The film was released on May 5, 2006, to negative critical reception and was a box office bomb that grossed just $8 million against a $15 million budget.

== Plot ==
Middle school student Roy A. Eberhardt and his parents have just moved to the fictional coastal town of Coconut Cove, Florida from Montana. Roy is mercilessly teased and bullied at his new school by Dana Matherson being called a “cowgirl”, until he accidentally breaks Dana's nose while getting harassed on the school bus and struggling to get free. As a result, Roy gets suspended from riding the school bus for two weeks and must write Dana an apology letter as a punishment, Dana rejects this apology. Roy slowly becomes friends with Beatrice "The Bear" Leep and her stepbrother "Mullet Fingers".

Meanwhile, an unknown person is found to be responsible for sabotaging a local construction site where a "Mother Paula's Pancake House" restaurant, overseen by corrupt regional manager Chuck Muckle, is about to be built. In order to catch the trespassers and prevent further vandalism, Officer David Delinko has parked his police car on the building site. Delinko falls asleep and an unknown prankster vandalizes the car by spray-painting its windows black.

The next day at breakfast, Roy and his parents read about the spray-painted police car. The police chief then gives Delinko a small police scooter to replace the vandalized car.

Soon, Roy learns that in order to build the pancake house, they must first kill the burrowing owls living on site. Mullet Fingers has been covertly pulling pranks to stop construction (including the tagging of Delinko's car), but Beatrice must take Roy into their confidence when he is badly bitten by guard dogs.

Roy joins their crusade to save the endangered owls. Leroy "Curly" Branitt, the beleaguered construction foreman, is trying to keep the construction schedule going, despite the presence of the owls, because of daily abuse from Muckle both over the phone, and later in person.

The trio reveals to Delinko and the rest of the town that there are burrowing owls on the lot. They then manage to get everyone to be quiet long enough for the owls to emerge, before Delinko puts Muckle in handcuffs, arresting him. Kimberly, the actress who plays Mother Paula, offers Coconut Cove the site as an owl preserve in the interest of damage control and publicly fires Muckle.

Roy's parents decide to stay in Florida. Delinko finally gets promoted to detective and gets an unmarked patrol car, until he accidentally backs it off a fishing pier. Dana is sent off to military school as punishment, where he gets bullied by the drill sergeants as payback for his own mean attitude. Muckle does community service for 90 days (then, after he is hit in the head and knocked unconscious by a falling coconut, the judge extends his sentence to 30 more days for lying down on the job).

The land is donated and turned into an animal sanctuary so the owls can continue to live there. Curly and Kimberly leave Mother Paula's Pancake House to raise dogs, and Roy continues to be friends with Beatrice and Mullet Fingers.

== Cast ==
- Luke Wilson as Officer David Delinko, a police officer in Coconut Cove.
- Logan Lerman as Roy A. Eberhardt, a boy who helps to save the burrowing owls.
- Brie Larson as Beatrice "The Bear" Leep, a girl that Roy befriends.
- Tim Blake Nelson as Leroy "Curly" Brannit, the construction foreman.
- Neil Flynn as Mr. Eberhardt, Roy's father.
- Robert Wagner as Mayor Grandy, the Mayor of Coconut Cove.
- Cody Linley as Napoleon Bridger "Mullet Fingers" Leep, the stepbrother of Beatrice whom Roy befriends.
- Clark Gregg as Chuck Muckle, the corrupt regional manager of "Mother Paula's Pancake House."
- Kiersten Warren as Mrs. Eberhardt, Roy's mother.
- Jessica Cauffiel as Kimberly Lou Dixon, the actress who portrays the titular mascot of "Mother Paula's Pancake House."
- Dean Collins as Garrett, Roy’s best friend
- Eric Phillips as Dana Matherson, a bully who picks on Roy.
- Damaris Justamante as Mrs. Matherson, Dana's mother.
- Jimmy Buffett as Mr. Ryan, the science teacher.
- John Archie as Captain
- Robert Donner as Kalor. This is Robert Donner's final film role before his death on June 8, 2006.
- Carl Hiaasen as Felix, Muckle's Assistant.

== Production ==
The principal filming locations were in Fort Lauderdale and Lauderdale by the Sea, on Florida's Atlantic Coast, and the Gulf Coast hamlet of Boca Grande on Gasparilla Island. Most of Hoot was shot in Florida between July 6, 2005, and September 2, 2005. Some new scenes were shot in Los Angeles on January 21, 2006. For example, the scene where Mullet Fingers leaps out of a tree after dropping a bulldozer seat was actually shot in Los Angeles. Hoot was shot during summer months, and the set did not escape Hurricane Katrina, which struck Southern Florida on August 25, 2005. Brie Larson and Cody Linley were moved from their beach-front hotel (Marriott Harbor Beach) to another hotel because of the storm.

== Distribution ==
=== Theatrical release ===
New Line Cinema and Walden Media pushed the film's initial release date of April 14, 2006 back to May 5, 2006, as only Mission: Impossible III and An American Haunting were opening wide that weekend. The gambit failed and Hoot opened at #10 at the U.S. and Canadian box office on 3,018 screens. The film's opening U.S. and Canadian box office was $3.4 million. Hoot held on at #10 for its second week then the movie broke a record set by Gigli for biggest drop in cinemas screening the film as it lost 2200 screens and came in at #19 on its third weekend. The film grossed $8,224,998 worldwide. In 2007, Walden Media's The Seeker nudged Hoot into second place in terms of 'biggest theatre drops'. Hoot topped The Seeker in reaching number one in the "worst super-saturated (3000 plus screens)" openings in the United States and Canada until The Rhythm Section topped the record: Hoot opened in almost 42% of all screens. The film's production budget was $15 million, although the costs for such a wide opening would probably have made the film considerably more expensive to distribute than it was to produce – the cost of its prints would have been twice as much as the production budget, according to respected industry opinions. Hoot entered the collection of the Museum of Modern Art (MOMA) in 2009.

=== Home media ===
DVD sales were more successful than the box office gross. Hoot was released on DVD on August 15, 2006, by New Line Home Entertainment. The film sold 114,528 units, bringing in $2,058,068 in the opening weekend.

A newer figure indicates that 703,786 units have been sold, translating to $10,972,266 in revenue.

== Reception ==
=== Critical response ===
On Rotten Tomatoes, Hoot has an approval rating of 26% based on reviews from 99 critics, with a consensus that "Lacking energy and humor, Hoot is a ho-hum story of eco-awareness that falls flat as a pancake." On Metacritic, it has a score of 46%, indicating "mixed or average" reviews. Audiences polled by CinemaScore gave the film an average grade of "A−" on an A+ to F scale.

One of the most positive reviews came from the Boston Globe's Ty Burr (3 stars out of 4), saying, "Hoot tells kids they can make a difference in this world, and that's worth a hundred Ice Age 2s." San Francisco Chronicle's Ruthe Stein gave the film a positive review (3 stars out of 4) and said, "...the film does nothing to dilute the save-the-Earth-and-every-creature-on-it message of Carl Hiaasen's ingeniously plotted award-winning children's book." Roger Ebert gave Hoot 1.5 stars (out of 4) and included Hoot in his 2007 book Your Movie Sucks, where he says "'Hoot' has its heart in the right place, but I have been unable to locate its brain" and "... the kids (especially Mullet Fingers) are likeable but not remotely believable". Michael Medved panned Hoot (2 stars out of 4) saying that "...the lame plot centers around a greedy developer who wants to bulldoze a lot inhabited by rare burrowing owls" and "though I'd like to root for 'Hoot', its entertainment value is moot".

=== Accolades ===
Logan Lerman, who played the lead role of Roy Eberhardt, won a Young Artist Award for his performance in Hoot. He received the nomination and win in early 2007 for Best Performance in a Feature Film – Leading Young Actor.

== Soundtrack ==
The soundtrack of Hoot (as appears on the accompanying soundtrack CD) has three elements: an original score, pop songs sung by a variety of artists, and pop songs (covers and originals) sung by Jimmy Buffett. The original score "Happy Ending" was composed by Mac McAnally, Michael Utley and Phil Marshall.

=== Track listing ===
Hoot Soundtrack
No.	Title	Artist	Length
1.	"Lovely Day"	Maroon 5 featuring Bill Withers and Kori Withers
2.	"Back of the Bus"	G Love and Special Sauce
3.	"Let Your Spirit Fly"	Ry Cuming
4.	"Coming Around"	Brie Larson
5.	"Funky Kingston"	Toots & the Maytals
6.	"Florida"	Mofro
7.	"Barefootin'"	Jimmy Buffett and Alan Jackson
8.	"Floridays"	Jimmy Buffett
9.	"Good Guys Win"	Jimmy Buffett
10.	"Werewolves of London"	Jimmy Buffett
11.	"Wondering Where the Lions Are"	Jimmy Buffett
