= Sarah Wright =

American actress (born 1983)

- Born: September 28, 1983 (age 43); Louisville, Kentucky, U.S.
- Occupation: Actress
- Years active: 1998–present
- Spouses: A. J. Mason (m. 2005; div. 2006); Eric Christian Olsen (m. 2012)
- Children: 4

Sarah Wright Olsen (born September 28, 1983) is an American actress, author, and entrepreneur.

== Early life ==
Wright was born on September 28, 1983, in Louisville, Kentucky, and grew up on a farm in Horse Cave. Her father was a pastor and her mother was a dental hygienist. She has one brother.

She had her first job at 9 years old in a local theatre production of A Christmas Carol and credits this as the moment she fell in love with acting. She also was a part of her high school Drama Club. At 15, she went on a nine country European tour with The Kentucky Ambassadors of Music as a singer.

She graduated from Seneca High School in 2003 at the age of 18. Wright also attended the University of California Los Angeles briefly, taking classes on children's book writing and horticulture.

== Career ==
Wright's career began in modeling when she was 14 years old. She traveled to a number of countries for modeling before getting her first minor acting role in the 1998 comedy Enchanted. At 18, she had moved to Chicago, Illinois and was working in commercials. Wright booked her first television pilot in 2004 and shortly moved to Los Angeles, California. This was her first big break, playing the role of Paige Chase in the short-lived sitcom Quintuplets, with Andy Richter and Rebecca Creskoff as her parents.

From 2006 to 2007, Wright also had a recurring role as Jane on the CW drama series 7th Heaven. She also co-starred in the Fox sitcom The Loop as Lizzy. The show ran for two seasons before being canceled in 2007. In 2008, in Fred Wolf's comedy film, The House Bunny, she played Ashley, who was a rival to Anna Farris, Emma Stone, and Kat Dennings' characters. She followed this with a number of guest appearances in the following years, including shows such as Accidentally on Purpose, Mad Men, How I Met Your Mother, and The Middle.

In 2011, Wright began a recurring role in the CBS mid-season replacement comedy series Mad Love and maintained a small recurring role as Millicent Gergich on the NBC mockumentary sitcom show Parks and Recreation. She would go on to appear as the main love interest in the 2013 comedy film, 21 & Over, alongside Justin Chon, Miles Teller, and Skylar Astin. From 2014 to 2015, she had a main role in NBC's sitcom, Marry Me, as Dennah before it was canceled.

In 2017, Wright co-starred alongside Tom Cruise in the action crime film American Made where she portrayed Lucy Seal. Her character was loosely based on Debbie Seal, the wife to American drug smuggler, Barry Seal. The cast also featured names such as Domhnall Gleeson, Alejandro Edda, Mauricio Mejía, Caleb Landry Jones and Jesse Plemons. The film received generally positive reviews and grossed $134 million worldwide. The following year, she landed the leading role in the CW's adaption of Carl Hiaasen's Skinny Dip, however the series was not picked up following the pilot.

She had a major role as Mandy Davis, the matriarch of the Davis family, in the 2020 Netflix's figure skating drama series, Spinning Out. The show received mixed reviews and was canceled the following month. This was followed up with a brief appearance in the sitcom Home Economics in 2021 before she took a break from acting. The following year, she released her first children's book Happiness is the Journey!, inspired by her daughter's experiences with online-learning during the COVID-19 pandemic.

She made her return to acting in 2026, when she had a guest appearance on the CBS legal drama series Matlock. She portrayed Gwen, an efficiency expert analyzing the law firm. Her second children's book When I Am Not with You: How We’re Together, Even When We’re Apart is set to come out in September.

=== Lifestyle and health ===
She and actress Teresa Palmer co-founded the parenting site Your Zen Mama in 2016. The website focuses on connecting mothers through their experiences of birthing and parenting. She also co-authored the book Zen Mamas: Finding Your Path Through Pregnancy, Birth and Beyond. The book shares information and advice on pregnancy, postpartum, miscarriages, breastfeeding, and caring for newborns. The two also share a podcast, "The Mother Daze," where they discuss womanhood and motherhood. She and Palmer took the podcast on tour in 2025.

In 2018, Wright launched Bare Essential Organics (Bāeo), a line of organic skin care. The brand launched with baby focused products, however expanded to whole-family skin care. She co-founded and co-owns the brand with Sarah Beyene and actress Anna Schafer.

== Personal life ==
In 2005, Wright married A. J. Mason. However, they divorced in 2006.

Wright met fellow actor Eric Christian Olsen, in 2006, on the set of the Fox sitcom The Loop. They served as co-stars and began dating. They married near Jackson Hole, Wyoming, on June 23, 2012. The couple have a son, born in 2013, and three daughters, born in 2016, 2020 and 2025.

The couple appeared on a 2015 episode of HGTV's House Hunters, where they chose their vacation home in Jackson Hole, while they had permanently resided in a California home until the 2025 California wildfires, where they lost the house.

She and her family are vegetarians.

== Bibliography ==
- Zen Mamas: Finding Your Path Through Pregnancy, Birth and Beyond (2021), ISBN 978-0785241508
- Happiness is the Journey! (2022), ISBN 979-8985218923
- When I Am Not with You: How We’re Together, Even When We’re Apart (2026) ISBN 978-0310177296

== Filmography ==
=== Film ===
Year	Title	Role	Notes
1998	Enchanted	David's High School Date	
2006	All You've Got	Lauren McDonald	
2007	X's & O's	Jane	
2008	Made of Honor	Sexy blonde	
2008	Wieners	Lavender	
2008	The House Bunny	Ashley	
2008	Surfer, Dude	Stacey	
2008	Streak	Ashley	Short film
2012	Touchback	Jenny	
2012	Celeste and Jesse Forever	Tera	
2013	21 & Over	Nicole	
2013	Girls Season 38		Short film
2014	Walk of Shame	Denise	
2017	American Made	Lucy Seal	
2019	The Place of No Words	Sarah/Knight in Shining Armor	

=== Television ===
Year	Title	Role	Notes
2004–2005	Quintuplets	Paige Chase	22 episodes
2005	CSI: Miami	Sara Jennings	Episode: "Prey"
2005	Malcolm in the Middle	Vicki	Episode: "Secret Boyfriend"
2006	The Loop	Lizzy	Series regular
2006–2007	7th Heaven	Jane	18 episodes
2007	Up All Night	Kris	Television film
2008	Mad Men	Susie	Episode: "Maidenform"
2008	Ernesto	Madizon Cutler	Television film
2009	Accidentally on Purpose	Sasha	Episode: "The Love Guru"
2009	How I Met Your Mother	Claire	Episode: "The Playbook"
2009	Waiting to Die	Brandi	Television film
2010	The Middle	Kasey	Episode: "A Birthday Story"
2010	True Love	Tiffany	Television film
2011	Mad Love	Tiffany McDermott	7 episodes
2011	The Assistants	Tina	Television film
2011–2013	Parks and Recreation	Millicent Gergich	5 episodes
2012	Happy Endings	Nikki	Episode: "The Shrink, the Dare, Her Date and Her Brother"
2012	Happy Valley	Agnes Little	Television film
2013	Men at Work	Molly	3 episodes
2013	Don't Trust the B— in Apartment 23	Trish Osborne	Episode: "Original Bitch..."
2013	Hello Ladies	Courtney	Episode: "Pilot"
2014	Mixology	Laura	3 episodes
2014–2015	Marry Me	Dennah	18 episodes
2015	House Hunters	Herself	Episode: "Television Actors Hunt for a Vacation Home in Jackson Hole, Wyoming"
2017	Lady Dynamite	Self	Episode: "Kids Have to Dance"
2018	Skinny Dip	Joey	Pilot episode
2020	Spinning Out	Mandy Davis	10 episodes
2021	Home Economics	Jessica	Episode: "Giant Jenga, $120"
2026	Matlock	Gwen	Episode: "Collateral"
