= Rob Hiaasen =

American journalist (1959–2018)

- Born: February 9, 1959; Plantation, Florida, U.S.
- Died: June 28, 2018 (aged 59); Annapolis, Maryland, U.S.
- Cause of death: Gunshot wound
- Education: University of Florida
- Occupations: Journalist; editor
- Employer: The Capital
- Spouse: Maria Mills (m. 1985)
- Children: 3
- Relatives: Carl Hiaasen (brother)
- Awards: Knight Journalism Fellow

Robert Keith Hiaasen (February 9, 1959 – June 28, 2018) was an American journalist and assistant editor at The Capital, a newspaper published in Annapolis, Maryland. He also taught at the University of Maryland's Philip Merrill College of Journalism. A native of Plantation, then a rural suburb of Fort Lauderdale, Florida, Hiaasen began his career at The Palm Beach Post before joining The Baltimore Sun as a feature writer and where he later wrote a regular column. He was shot and killed at work at The Capital during the Capital Gazette shooting.

== Early life and education ==
Hiaasen was from Fort Lauderdale, Florida, born in 1959 and raised in Plantation, Florida, then a rural suburb of Fort Lauderdale. He had an older brother, the novelist Carl Hiaasen, and two older sisters. He graduated from the University of Florida.

== Career ==
Hiaasen began his journalism career at WPTF in Raleigh, North Carolina, working there from 1984 to 1985. In the 1990s, Hiaasen worked at The Palm Beach Post where he covered local politics. He conducted an award-winning investigation into the case of David J. Acer, the Jensen Beach dentist who allegedly infected his patients with HIV. Hiaasen also worked at radio stations in the South.

In 1993, he moved to Maryland to become a feature writer at The Baltimore Sun. Hiaasen later became a columnist where he wrote in-depth stories such as one about Roger H. Martin, who took an unusual sabbatical from a career as a university administrator to become a fresh student at St. John's College. Hiaasen also wrote considerably about Kirk Bloodworth, a death row inmate who was the first in the United States to be cleared of wrongdoing through DNA evidence. He was a staff reporter for the Baltimore Sun for 15 years.

He wrote a short fiction story entitled, "Over My Dead Body". It was published in 2006 in Baltimore Noir (Akashic Books), a collection of stories about the city written by several Baltimore Sun journalists including Laura Lippman, who also served as the editor of the book. A novel, Float Plan, was published posthumously in September 2018, with proceeds donated to Everytown for Gun Safety.

Hiaasen joined The Capital in 2010 as a Sunday columnist and assistant editor and also worked as an adjunct professor at the Philip Merrill College of Journalism.

== Personal life and death ==
In June 1985, Hiaasen married Maria Hiaasen (née Mills), a former journalist and English teacher. Together, they had three children. His older brother, Carl Hiaasen, is an author and journalist, known for writing and publishing Hoot. Rob Hiaasen was a resident of Timonium, Maryland.

On June 28, 2018, Hiaasen was one of five people who were shot and killed during the Capital Gazette shooting. It was his wife's birthday.

== Awards ==
Hiaasen was a John S. Knight Journalism Fellow at Stanford.

== Selected works ==
— (2006). "Over My Dead Body". In Lippman, Laura (ed.). Baltimore Noir. Akashic Books. pp. 60–71. ISBN 978-1-936070-19-0.

== See also ==
- List of journalists killed in the United States
