= Ecotage! =

1972 book edited by Sam Love and David Obst

- Author: Sam Love, David Obst
- Publisher: Pocket Books
- Publication date: 1972
- ISBN: 0-671-78180-4

Ecotage! was a 1972 paperback book edited by Sam Love and David Obst and published by Pocket Books.

The book was a collection of ideas that had been solicited by the group Environmental Action over the previous year in preparation for the publication of the book, for using sabotage, attention-grabbing stunts, and other ideas to draw attention to environmental issues. "Ecotage" is a contraction of ecological (or economic) and sabotage. The cover of Ecotage! features a photograph of a hippie throwing a pie in the face of a business executive.

The book is credited as one of the early inspirations for radical environmental activism, along with similar works such as Edward Abbey's 1975 novel The Monkey Wrench Gang.

The book was inspired by the actions of an individual who operated in the Chicago, Illinois area. Calling himself "The Fox", he engaged in such activities as plugging smokestacks and entering the offices of corporate executives to dump sewage on their desks. In turn, some of the actions suggested in Ecotage! actually began to be carried out, particularly billboarding, when small groups in the early 1970s such as the one calling themselves the "Eco-Raiders" in Tucson, Arizona, began cutting down billboards.

The term ecotage may have originated with this book; the term has since passed into general use as a synonym for various direct action tactics (see also monkeywrenching).

== Publication ==
- Love, Sam and David Obst, eds. (1972), Ecotage! ISBN 0-671-78180-4
