= Fever Beach =

2025 novel by Carl Hiaasen

- Author: Carl Hiaasen
- Language: English
- Publisher: Knopf
- Publication date: 2025
- ISBN: 978-0-593-32094-5 (first edition, hardcover)

Fever Beach is a 2025 satirical novel by American author Carl Hiaasen. The novel tells the story of two white supremacists who are starting their own white-supremacy group. It features the character Twilly Spree, who Hiaasen introduced in the 2000 novel Sick Puppy.

Fever Beach was published by Knopf on May 13, 2025. Hiaasen dedicated the novel to Jimmy Buffett, who died during the writing of the book. Hiaasen co-wrote the song "Fish Porn" with Buffett on Buffett's final 2023 album Equal Strain on All Parts.

The novel was reviewed by The New York Times, the Wall Street Journal, the Washington Post, and The Times of London.
