= Kick Ass (Hiaasen book) =

Book by Carl Hiaasen

- First edition
- Author: Carl Hiaasen, Diane Stevenson (ed.)
- Language: English
- Publisher: University Press of Florida
- Publication date: October 1999
- Publication place: United States
- Media type: Print (Hardcover, Softcover)
- Pages: 471 pages
- ISBN: 0813017173
- OCLC: 41712895
- Dewey Decimal: 975.9'063
- Followed by: Paradise Screwed: Selected Columns

Kick Ass is the first of three books which highlight some of Carl Hiaasen's best columns in the newspaper Miami Herald. It was published in 1999, and followed by Paradise Screwed: Selected Columns (2001) and Dance of the Reptiles (2014).

The editor, Diane Stevenson, selected columns that focused on Hiaasen's views on growth and government in Florida. Kirkus described Hiaasen as "a crystalline, pitiless seer of human weakness" and stated the book is "deeply satisfying, both for what it reveals of the serious priorities of a supposedly light novelist and for the outrageous epic of Florida profiteering and entropy within."
