= Gobshite Quarterly =

- Discipline: Literary journal
- Language: Multilingual
- Edited by: R.V. Branham

Publication details
- History: 2003–present
- Publisher: GobQ, LLC. (United States)
- Frequency: Biannual

Standard abbreviations
- ISO 4: Gobshite Q.

Indexing
- ISSN: 1547-5875
- LCCN: 2003206225
- OCLC no.: 53462735

Links
- Journal homepage

Gobshite Quarterly is a literary magazine based in Portland, Oregon. The journal was founded in 2002 by R.V. Branham, M.F. McAuliffe, and Richard Johnson. The journal began publishing major movements of post-War 20th century European writing, Karel Čapek, László Krasnahorkai, Ivan Klíma; Arabic writing, Mahmoud Darwish, Vénus Khoury-Gata, Hanan Al-Shayk; Spanish magical realism, Laura Esquivel, Luisa Valenzuela; contemporary graphics from Poland, the U.S., South Africa, Australia. Gobshite has featured contemporary writing and graphics from established writers of the Pacific Northwest: Doug Spangle, Walt Curtis, Katherine Dunn, Tom Spanbauer, Lidia Yuknavitch, David Biespiel, Ursula K. Le Guin, Chuck Palahniuk, Richard Melo, and Shannon Wheeler.

Each double issue is laid out in a flip-book format, without templates. Since issue #2, the cover illustrations have been watercolors by Adelaide-born Australian artist Graham Willoughby. The second half of each issue is laid out upside down and backwards; the final pages of each issue meet in the center. Gobshite Quarterly focuses on multilingual writing and features poems and stories translated into or originally written in Spanish, Arabic, Icelandic, Persian, Albanian, Finnish, French, Portuguese, Italian, Russian, Lithuanian, Gaelic, Japanese, Korean, Bangla, English, and many others.

== History ==
R. V. Branham, who grew up in the multi-lingual, multi-ethnic city of Calexico, California, wanted to include formally unacceptable speech in a literary journal.

M. F. McAuliffe was born and educated in Adelaide and Melbourne. She holds an Honors degree in English from Flinders University and a Graduate Diploma in Art from Swinburne College of Technology. After moving to Oregon in 1992 she worked as a MARC editor at Blackwell North America and then in various positions at Multnomah County Library, ultimately working as a copy cataloger.

McAuliffe began publishing fiction in Damon Knight's Clarion Awards in 1984. Throughout the 1990s she continued to publish fiction in Australian Short Stories (edited by Bruce Pascoe), Overland, and The Adelaide Review edited by Christopher Pearson. She also published poetry in Australian literary journals such as Famous Reporter. In 1998 she co-authored the poetry collection Fighting Monsters with Judith Steele.

Branham, Johnson and McAuliffe met at Michigan State University's Clarion East Workshop in 1981. In 1993, prior to founding Gobshite, Branham served as Urban Jungle Editor for the Portland-based culture and arts periodical, Paperback Jukebox.

In 2002, McAuliffe co-founded the multilingual journal Gobshite Quarterly with R.V. Branham and Richard Johnson. In 2006–2007 she co-edited the second volume of Broken Word: The Alberta Street Anthology, with Douglas Spangle, Michael Shay, and others.

Initially, Gobshite Quarterly was published in standard newsstand magazine format from 2002 to 2004; in 2006 the magazine became a double issue CD-ROM. With the collapse of magazine distribution from 2006 through 2008, and closure of bookstore chains Tower Books and Borders, Gobshite Quarterly transitioned to the internet for a few years. In December 2011 and again in March 2012, a winter/spring 2012 issue #12 was published in collaboration with Publication Studio/Portland. Since 2013, Gobshite Quarterly has published two double issues per year, globally distributed through Ingram Spark in a 9"×6", print on demand, perfect bound, flip-book format. The magazine's Portland offices were originally at NE 14th and Prescott. In 2003 the offices moved to NE Roth St.

== Awards ==
In December 2003, Gobshite Quarterly was awarded a Literary Arts Publisher’s Fellowship, and a small grant from the Oregon chapter of the National Writers Union soon after. In 2010, Gobshite Quarterly also received grants from the Frankfurt Book Fair and the Argentine Ministry of Culture. In 2014, Gobshite Quarterly received a grant from MESO (Micro Enterprise Services of Oregon). In 2016, Gobshite Quarterly received travel grants from the Lithuanian and Croatian Ministries of Culture

In November 2016, McAuliffe's poem "Crucifix 1" appeared in the Yoko Ono installation Arising at the Reykjavik Art Museum.

== GobQ/Reprobate Books ==
In 2008 Soft Skull Press and Gobshite Quarterly co-published R.V. Branham’s Curse & Berate in 69+ Languages, a 90-language dictionary of insults. Described by Willamette Week as "overflowing with invectives, curses and blasphemous belittlings, the book is more than a resource guide for becoming a multilingual potty mouth." In 2010 GobQ Books (later Reprobate/GobQ Books) published a bilingual, en face edition of El Gato Eficaz (Deathcats), an early magical realist novel by Luisa Valenzuela. This is the only complete English language translation of this title. Deathcats has been followed by a number of other titles by Gobshite Quarterly contributors. Most recently GobQ has begun to produce very small chapbooks of poetry and nonfiction by contributors or others, either completely in English or with parallel text in one or more languages.

In 2011 GobQ partnered with Portland's Publication Studio (founded by Matthew Stadler and Patricia No) to publish Golems Waiting Redux, a limited edition artist’s book about the disfigurement and destruction of Portland artist Daniel Duford's 2002 experimental installation of large clay golem sculptures. In 2012, Gobshite again partnered with Publication Studio to return to print with its 12th issue.

Since 2013 McAuliffe has edited several poetry collections for Reprobate/GobQ Books, as assistant editor for the collection by Holbrook Award-winning Portland poet Douglas Spangle, and as principal editor for collections by Pascall Prize-winning Australian poet, journalist and critic Mark Mordue, Portland poet Michael Shay, and South Australian Red Earth Poetry Prize-winner Judith Steele.
