= Capital Gazette shooting =

2018 mass shooting in Maryland, U.S.

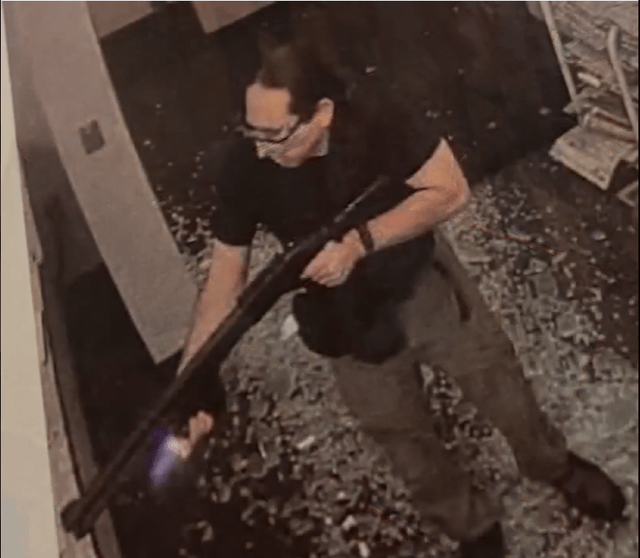
- CCTV footage showing Jarrod Ramos with a shotgun and flashlight attached inside the Capital Gazette newsroom

- Anne Arundel County (Maryland) Anne Arundel County (the United States)
- Location: 38°59′39″N 76°32′37″W; 888 Bestgate Road; Parole, Maryland, U.S.
- Date: June 28, 2018 c. 2:30 - 2:35 p.m. (EDT)
- Attack type: Mass shooting; mass murder
- Weapon: 12-gauge Mossberg 590A1L pump-action shotgun
- Deaths: 5
- Injuries: 2
- Perpetrator: Jarrod Warren Ramos
- Motive: Narcissistic injury, grudge against Capital Gazette for reporting negative information about him
- Charges: Five counts of first-degree murder; one count of attempted first-degree murder; six counts of first-degree assault; 11 counts of firearm use in commission of a felony or violent crime

On June 28, 2018, a mass shooting occurred at the offices of The Capital, a newspaper serving Annapolis, Maryland, United States. The gunman, Jarrod Ramos, killed five employees with a shotgun and injured two others who were trying to escape. Ramos was arrested shortly thereafter. He pleaded guilty but not criminally responsible to 23 charges; in July 2021, a jury found him criminally responsible. It is the deadliest workplace shooting in Maryland history.

The Capital had published an article in 2011 about Ramos being put on probation for harassing an acquaintance from high school through social media and email. Ramos, angered by the article, brought a defamation lawsuit against the newspaper but a judge later dismissed the suit. Ramos is alleged to have sent enraged letters and messages to The Capital threatening to attack its newsroom and staff, but no legal action was taken after the threats were received.

Capital Gazette Communications, owned by Tribune Publishing through its subsidiary the Baltimore Sun Media Group, publishes the daily newspapers The Capital and the Maryland Gazette and the weekly Crofton-West County Gazette. At the time of the shooting, its offices were located at 888 Bestgate Road in Parole, an unincorporated area of Anne Arundel County just outside Annapolis.

== Incident ==
Sometime after 2 p.m. (EDT) on June 28, 2018, Jarrod Ramos arrived at The Capital's offices on Bestgate Road. He barricaded the rear exit of the office with a Barracuda Intruder Defense system device to prevent people from escaping, and another exit had another such device near it, but not deployed, and then he entered the building with a left-handed 12-gauge Mossberg 590A1L pump-action shotgun and a backpack laden with smoke bombs, flashbang devices, and grenades. Police later said that the gun had been purchased legally in the previous 18 months.

Around 2:30 p.m., Ramos "shot through the glass door to the office and opened fire on multiple employees", according to Phil Davis, a courts and crime reporter for the Capital who took refuge as the shooting began. Davis later described hearing the gunman reload.

Wendi Winters, a reporter, charged the gunman with a trash can and recycling bin, screaming at him, distracting him long enough for survivors to escape or take refuge between filing cabinets. Ramos then shot her.

The Anne Arundel County Police Department received reports of the shooting around 2:34 pm; officers reportedly arrived within one minute of their dispatch. The police discovered Ramos underneath a desk in the office, and surveillance within the office documented the incident and helped identify him as the perpetrator. Davis described the newspapers' offices as a "war zone" after the shooting.

Several injured victims were sent to Anne Arundel Medical Center for treatment. County police evacuated 170 people from the building to a reunification center set up at the nearby Westfield Annapolis shopping center. Survivors were later interviewed by the criminal investigations unit of the Anne Arundel County Police Department.

== Victims ==
Ramos killed five people and injured two more. The dead were:

- Gerald Fischman, age 61, columnist and editorial page editor for The Capital
- Rob Hiaasen, age 59, assistant editor and weekend columnist for The Capital
- John McNamara, age 56, sports reporter for The Capital and editor and primary reporter for The Bowie Blade-News
- Rebecca Smith, age 34, sales assistant who had just started working for Capital Gazette Communications
- Wendi Winters, age 65, community beat reporter and special publication editor for The Capital

According to the Committee to Protect Journalists, the Capital Gazette shooting was one of two incidents in which multiple journalists were killed in the United States since the organization began compiling data in 1992. The other incident was the murders of Alison Parker and Adam Ward during a live television interview in 2015.

== Perpetrator ==
Jarrod Warren Ramos
- Born: December 21, 1979 (age 46); Laurel, Maryland, U.S.
- Education: University of Maryland, College Park
- Criminal charges: First-degree murder (5 counts); Attempted first-degree murder First-degree assault (6 counts); Firearm use in commission of a felony or violent crime (11 counts)
- Penalty: 5 life sentences plus 345 years

Details
- Imprisoned at: North Branch Correctional Institution, Cumberland, Maryland, U.S.

Jarrod Warren Ramos (born December 21, 1979) was arrested by police and taken into custody as a suspect, but refused to identify himself. Early reports said that the gunman mutilated his fingertips to avoid identification, but a law-enforcement official later stated that an issue with the fingerprint machine had caused the difficulties in identifying the suspect, and that his fingertips had not been mutilated. The police later announced that he had specifically targeted Capital Gazette Communications.

In a court filing, Ramos stated he had seen five mental health professionals for at least 75 visits before the shooting, and exhibited a pattern of threats. Many of those around Ramos said he was a calculated, manipulative loner, who would become angry when things did not go his way. Some were convinced that he would one day hurt someone. None of Ramos's immediate family responded to requests for comment; other relatives said that they had had no contact with him for several years.

=== Previous dispute with newspaper ===
In 2012, Ramos sued The Capital in a defamation case he brought over a 2011 newspaper article reporting on his guilty plea for criminal harassment. After multiple appeals from Ramos, the defamation case against the newspaper was dismissed in 2015 by Prince George's County circuit court judge Maureen M. Lamasney, who ruled in favor of the paper because their reporting was based on publicly available records and Ramos had produced no evidence that the article was inaccurate. Lamasney wrote in her court opinion that Ramos's complaint was "a fundamental failure to understand what defamation law is, and more particularly, what defamation law is not".

Former Capital editor and publisher Thomas Marquardt said Ramos began harassing the staff of the newspaper after the article on him was published in 2011. In 2013, Marquardt contacted the Anne Arundel County Police Department about Ramos's behavior, but the department did not pursue the report. Marquardt also consulted the newspaper's attorneys about filing a restraining order against Ramos, and recalled telling them, "This is a guy who is going to come in and shoot us". After his lawsuit against the newspaper was dismissed, Ramos opened a Twitter account, which he used to attack the newspaper and taunt its owners and staff. A former FBI senior profiler speculated that Ramos was "an injustice collector", whom she described as "someone who goes through life ... collect[ing] injustices, real or imagined".

Ramos reportedly previously sent threatening letters to the newspaper's former attorney, to the Maryland Court of Special Appeals, and to Charles Moylan Jr., the appellate judge who had ruled against Ramos in his defamation case.

=== Other lawsuits ===
Ramos's use of the justice system as a tool for exerting his will in at least two other cases. When he was dismissed from his job at the Bureau of Labor Statistics, over "suitability concerns", he sued the agency and won the case, yet was still dismissed from the agency. In 2009, a former classmate took out peace orders (a type of restraining order used to prevent contact between people), followed by criminal harassment charges, which he lost. In an affidavit, the harassment victim wrote, "I am physically afraid of Mr. Ramos, and that he may cause me serious physical injury and/or death".

=== June 28, 2018, letters ===
On Thursday, June 28, police reported that Ramos sent letters to three people who had been involved in his defamation lawsuit, with a packet being received by The Capital's former attorney that included a letter addressed to Judge Moylan, who wrote the opinion upholding the dismissal of his defamation case. In it, he wrote, "Welcome, Mr. Moylan, to your unexpected legacy: YOU should have died ... Friends forever, Jarrod W. Ramos". The letter continues; "I further certify I then did proceed to the office of respondent Capital-Gazette Communications ... with the objective of killing every person present". One of the letters thought to have been written by the suspect was published by other news sources.

=== Guilty plea and trial ===
On July 20, 2018, Anne Arundel County prosecutors indicted Jarrod W. Ramos on 23 counts: five counts of first-degree murder, one count of attempted first-degree murder, six counts of first-degree assault, and 11 counts of the use of a firearm in the commission of a felony. Ramos was charged with five counts of first-degree murder; one count of attempted first-degree murder, for shooting at photographer Paul Gillespie; six counts of first-degree assault related to the attacks on Gillespie, staff writers Selene San Felice, Phil Davis, and Rachael Pacella, reporting intern Anthony Messenger, and sales associate Janel Cooley; and 11 counts of using a firearm in the commission of a felony or violent crime. He was ordered to be held without bail after he was determined to be a flight risk and a danger to the community, and was placed on suicide watch while in custody of law enforcement.

On August 20, 2018, Ramos pleaded not guilty to all charges. On April 29, 2019, Ramos entered a plea of not guilty and not criminally responsible, and the judge ordered that he be evaluated by the Department of Health and Mental Hygiene. At a pretrial hearing held on October 21, 2019, the judge ruled that based on the Health Department's report, Ramos is legally sane and can be held criminally responsible for his actions and his pending trial should proceed. The following week, Ramos pleaded guilty but not responsible by reason of insanity to all 23 counts. Since he pleaded not criminally responsible, the remaining legal issue was whether Ramos is legally responsible for the multiple murders.

A trial date was delayed several times due to the large quantity of evidence, the COVID-19 pandemic, and the reassignment of a judge.

At a two-week trial, six survivors of the shooting gave evidence, and expert witnesses on both sides also gave testimony. Expert witnesses for the defense determined that Ramos had autism spectrum disorder, obsessive-compulsive disorder, delusional disorder and narcissistic personality disorder; expert witnesses for the prosecution determined that Ramos had schizotypal personality disorder and narcissistic personality disorder with obsessive compulsive personality traits but found no signs of autism and had a fairly normal childhood. A neuropsychologist questioned the diagnosis of autism testifying that they did not adequately test him and did not have all the information from relatives to determine autism. Psychologist Marshall Cowan also disagreed with his autism diagnosis, stating that the absence of medical and academic records makes it unlikely Ramos has autism. They also found that his behaviors were inconsistent with obsessive-compulsive disorder, with the OCD symptoms Ramos reported having been contradicted by correctional officers and did not have delusional disorder or psychotic disorders. They testified that he was sane at the time of the killings. A court-appointed forensic psychiatrist, Dr. Sameer Patel, testified that Ramos suffered a "severe narcissistic injury" from the Capital Gazette article about his harassment allegations in 2011 and was motivated by a fixation on revenge; that Ramos had expressed regret that he had been unable to kill everyone in the newsroom and the state's attorney; and that Ramos had carefully planned the attack on the newspaper's office after determining that a courthouse, his initial target, was too secure. In July 2021, the jury found Ramos criminally responsible, rejecting Ramos's insanity defense and determining that he committed the killings while mentally competent and capable of conforming his actions to the law.

On September 28, 2021, Ramos was sentenced to five life terms plus 345 years in prison.

== Reactions ==
=== Law enforcement in other locations ===
Police were also sent to the offices of The Baltimore Sun, which owns Capital Gazette Communications, as a precaution, although no threat was registered there. The New York City Police Department also deployed counter-terrorism units to the headquarters of major news outlets in New York City as a precaution against similar attacks. The Chicago Police Department took similar actions.

=== Political ===
President Donald Trump was briefed on the shooting and offered his thoughts and prayers by tweet. He later declined to lower US flags to half-staff, as is custom for mass shootings, despite requests from Annapolis mayor Gavin Buckley and the lowering of Maryland flags by the Governor of Maryland, Larry Hogan. On July 3, the White House was reported to have permitted the lowering of the US flags on federal buildings for the day, with the President then issuing a proclamation for the flags to be lowered nationwide until sunset on July 3.

Some commentators have called the shooting an attack on the media, and framed it alongside comments by Trump that the "fake news media" (The New York Times, The Washington Post, ABC, CBS, CNN, NBC News) are the "enemy of the people". A Reuters journalist made comments blaming Trump, and later apologized for those comments; Reuters said it did not condone the journalist's behavior. The Sunday after the shooting, the staff of the Capital Gazette wrote, "We won't forget being called an enemy of the people".

Days before, right-wing commentator Milo Yiannopoulos wrote that he "can't wait for vigilante squads to start gunning journalists down on sight" in text messages to reporters. After the shooting, Yiannopoulos said the texts were just a joke.

On Reason.com, Elizabeth Nolan Brown criticized the media response to the shooting, writing that Ramos' "motive doesn't seem related to any of the political agendas offered up in the immediate aftermath by hacks and provocateurs", and that the shooter's anger against the newspaper derived from a personal grudge rather than political motivations. Similarly, the Franklin Daily Journal wrote that "the shooting had nothing to do with Trump or his ongoing battle with the press ... the crisis in Maryland allowed people to criticize political opponents who had nothing to do with the actual events".

Governor Hogan tweeted that he was "[a]bsolutely devastated to learn of this tragedy in Annapolis", and asked residents to "heed all warnings and stay away from the area". In a press conference, he praised local law enforcement for responding within 60 seconds.

In March and April 2019, the Maryland General Assembly voted unanimously to designate June 28 "Freedom of the Press Day" in honor of the victims.

=== Journalism ===
After the shooting, Tronc CEO Justin Dearborn said: "We are focused now on providing our employees and their families with support during this tragic time. We commend the police and first responders for their quick response". The owner of the Capital Gazette created a fund for the families, victims, and survivors of the shooting, in addition to a scholarship memorial fund for journalism students. A separate GoFundMe fundraiser, created by a Bloomberg Government reporter, hit the initial target and grew to almost $200,000 by July 1, 2019.

Reporters for The Capital and Gazette began coverage of the shooting as it happened, from the newsroom and while returning from the field. Despite the shooting, journalists and staff at The Capital insisted on putting out the next edition of their paper only hours after the fatal shootings. The edition's opinion page was left blank to commemorate the victims, with the exception of a small note stating that the staff members "are speechless".

The Capital published an editorial on July 1, 2018, signed by its entire staff of reporters and editors, thanking the citizens of Annapolis and Anne Arundel County for their support following the shooting.

In December 2018, the staff of Capital Gazette Communications was selected as a recipient of Time's Person of the Year 2018, as one of "The Guardians", a collection of journalists from around the world in their fight against the "War on Truth". Subsequently, the Reporters Without Borders declared the U.S. as one of the five most dangerous countries to be a journalist due to the tragedy.

On April 2, 2019, the News Leaders Association selected the staff of the Capital Gazette and The Baltimore Sun as the winners of the Al Neuharth Breaking News Reporting Award for their coverage of the shootings. The Capital Gazette staff were also named as finalists for the Burl Osborne Award for Editorial Leadership – Small, and the Visual Journalism Award – Small.

The Capital was awarded a Pulitzer Prize Special Citation on April 15, 2019, to "honor the journalists, staff and editorial board of the Capital Gazette, Annapolis, Maryland, for their courageous response to the largest killing of journalists in U.S. history in their newsroom on June 28, 2018, and for demonstrating unflagging commitment to covering the news and serving their community at a time of unspeakable grief". The citation also included a $100,000 bequest "to further the newspaper's journalistic mission", and the editorial staff were named as finalists for the Pulitzer Prize in Editorial Writing.

=== Vigils and memorials ===
Colleagues, friends, and family members of the deceased victims held a candlelit vigil on the streets of Annapolis on June 29, to honor the deceased. Capital Gazette reporter Phil Davis read the names of the deceased, and told the crowds that they were here "to honor who (the victims) were and what their families did not have to go through".

Annapolis mayor Gavin Buckley announced that the city planned to hold a summer music festival that will act as a celebration of the freedom of the press and as a memorial for the journalists who were killed. The concert was held on July 28, 2018, under the title Annapolis Rising: A Benefit for The Capital Gazette and Free Press. The event featured performances by the rock bands Good Charlotte and Less Than Jake, a presentation by comedian Jordan Klepper, and a speech by Washington Post editor-in-chief Martin Baron. Proceeds from this event will be used to benefit a fund established for the victims and survivors, as well as journalism scholarships.

In July 2018, the equipment manager of the Washington Capitals, the 2018 Stanley Cup champions, brought the Stanley Cup to the Capital Gazette's temporary office to boost the employees' morale.

In December 2020, Wendi Winters, who rushed the shooter and was credited with saving the lives of her colleagues by allowing them time to escape, was posthumously awarded the Carnegie Medal by the Carnegie Hero Fund Commission.

In September 2025, Anne Arundel County officials unveiled a new highway marker dedicating Rowe Boulevard to the five employees killed in the shooting.

=== Physical memorial sites ===
Nearly one year after the shooting, Tribune Publishing Chairman David Dreier established the Fallen Journalists Memorial Foundation (FJM Foundation), which aims to construct a memorial in Washington, D.C. to honor journalists who have died in pursuit of the truth. Congress unanimously passed the Fallen Journalists Memorial Act in December 2020. In the same month, President Donald Trump signed the act into law, authorizing the FJM Foundation to establish a commemorative work honoring fallen journalists.

On the first anniversary of the shooting, a memorial garden with a plaque honoring the five victims was dedicated at Acton Cove Park in Annapolis.

A memorial to the five murdered Capital Gazette staffers, entitled Guardians of the First Amendment, was unveiled in Newman Park in Annapolis on June 28, 2021, the third anniversary of the shooting. It consists of five pillars and a stone with an engraving of the text of the First Amendment.

== See also ==
- Bradford Bishop
- Charlie Hebdo shooting
- 2018 Aberdeen, Maryland shooting
- Mass shootings in the United States
- List of journalists killed in the United States
- Fallen Journalists Memorial Foundation
