= Team Rodent =

1998 book by Carl Hiaasen

- Paperback book cover
- Author: Carl Hiaasen
- Cover artist: Ruth Ross
- Language: English
- Genre: non-fiction
- Publisher: The Ballantine Publishing Group
- Publication date: May 1998
- Publication place: United States
- Media type: Print (Paperback), Audio Cassette
- Pages: 96
- ISBN: 978-0-345-42280-4 (Paperback edition)
- OCLC: 38862546
- Dewey Decimal: 384/.8/0979494 21
- LC Class: PN1999.W27 H53 1998

Team Rodent is a non-fiction book, collecting a series of essays written by Carl Hiaasen about the Walt Disney Company and its stance towards the outside world. The book's primary focus is on non-film related Disney enterprises such as Disney World and their effects on the environment and local culture.

== Contents ==
- "Ready to Drop" juxtaposes the opening of a Disney Store in New York City's Times Square with the "entrenched" pornography shops on the opposite side of the square. Hiaasen marvels that Disney may be the first company to succeed, where generations of Manhattan politicians have failed, in evicting "smut peddlers" from Times Square, in the same manner as they have succeeded in transforming Orlando, and the State of Florida as a whole, in its own image. Yet as repugnant as people find the pornographers' merchandise, they should be equally wary of Disney's influence and its reality-distorting effects.
- "Insane Clown Michael" examines the influence of Michael Eisner on the Disney Company, reminding the readers that Disney is not only a purveyor of children's entertainment, but also the parent company of several film, television and music production companies that produce decidedly "adult" fare ("The same folks who brought you 101 Dalmatians, a movie featuring adorable puppies, also brought you Pulp Fiction, a movie featuring junkies, hit men, and bondage freaks.") The essay takes its name from the hip hop group Insane Clown Posse, whose album "The Great Milenko" was hastily removed from Disney's Hollywood Records stores in response to protests over the obscenity of its lyrics. Hiaasen half-facetiously posits that the whole incident was a publicity stunt orchestrated by Eisner, who did not expect high sales from the album had it remained available, and needed a convenient way of showcasing Disney's commitment to "wholesome" family entertainment in response to protests from Christian fundamentalist groups over Disney World's recently instituted "Gay Day" event. Yet the incident reveals that Eisner, and the Disney Company as a whole, are so fanatically image-conscious that they actively work to reshape reality to their liking, as in Orlando, where Disney World's Bay Lake was landscaped to change the natural "tea-colored" water to the blue color expected by out-of-state tourists.
- "Bull Run" details one of the Disney Company's rare failures: its abortive attempt in 1993 to build a new theme park in Haymarket, Virginia, because of protests against the proposed development's proximity to the Manassas battlefield. In particular, Hiaasen contrasts the Virginians' experience with Disney's representatives with that of Floridians' – specifically, that Disney is so used to deference and gratitude from Orlando's communities and politicians that it was unprepared for the level of resistance it encountered.
- "Republic of Walt" examines the Reedy Creek Improvement District, where Disney World is located, which has been granted unprecedented levels of autonomy, including control over its own utilities, tax levies, municipal codes, and police and fire departments. Yet when these private security forces act illegally, Disney is quick to disclaim any assumption of police authority, in order to ensure that its corporate practices may remain secret.
- "The Puppy King" further examines Disney's "fast-tightening grip on the global entertainment culture", as illustrated by the release of 101 Dalmatians in 1996, which led to a predictable surge in purchases of Dalmatian puppies by star-struck families, followed by an equally predictable surge in these dogs being abandoned and euthanized, as families realized that real-life Dalmatians are not as cute and well-behaved as the movie version. Hiaasen concludes, "In fairness, [Eisner] didn't invent Disney's overpowering brand of make-believe. He simply took it worldwide."
- "Fantasy Fantasy Island" focuses on the launch of Disney's new cruise line in 1996, with ports of call including Port Canaveral, Nassau and Castaway Cay, formerly Gorda Cay, the site of an illegal airstrip used frequently in drug trafficking to South Florida – a fact which Disney doubtlessly has gone to great lengths to conceal.
- "Future World" examines Disney's forays into building housing communities in Florida: Celebration (still in development at the time of writing), and Country Walk (which was devastated by Hurricane Andrew in 1992). Both communities, Hiaasen writes, are characteristic of Disney: Celebration, while ostensibly an independent municipality, is actually rigidly controlled by Disney's corporate officers; when Country Walk's homes were found to be poorly constructed, Disney obtained a legal injunction to keep its name out of the homeowners' lawsuits, keeping the named defendants as the Arvida Corporation, which Disney divested itself of before the hurricane. In both cases, homeowners' trust in Disney explained their willingness to buy homes carrying their name.
- "Whistle While We Work" admits that Disney is a master at courting the American media, especially through the use of press junkets. Hiaasen himself attended one such junket in 1986 (the last time he went to Disney World at the time of writing), where he embarrassed the hospitality staff by attempting (unsuccessfully) to pay full price for his room and meals, and refusing to accept the "goody bag" he was offered. Hiaasen also recounts the "one shining, spontaneous moment" during the junket, when journalist Nicholas Daniloff, recently released from detainment in the Soviet Union, was invited on stage to speak, and deftly evaded Mickey Mouse's attempt to hug him for the benefit of the news cameras.
- "Jungle Book" focuses on Disney's latest venture, the opening of its Animal Kingdom park, which Hiaasen notes is uncharacteristic for its tolerance of "actual" wildlife (by contrast, a flock of buzzards that invaded Disney World in 1988 was ruthlessly killed, incurring charges of animal cruelty that Disney settled out of court). Animal Kingdom's opening was marred by the unexpected death, in transit, of a black rhinoceros purchased for the park. Hiaasen admits he was disappointed when the animal's death was attributed to factors occurring before its arrival in Orlando, simply because Disney's "safe" form of entertainment usually requires the eviction or extermination of as many actual animals as are found on its development sites, a fact which Hiaasen believes does not receive nearly enough press attention.

== See also ==
- Native Tongue (Carl Hiaasen novel)
