= Scat (novel) =

2009 novel by Carl Hiaasen

- Author: Carl Hiaasen
- Language: Spanish/English
- Genre: Realistic fiction
- Publisher: Knopf
- Publication date: 13 Jan 2009
- Publication place: United States
- Media type: Print (Hardcover or paperback)
- Pages: 371
- ISBN: 0-375-83486-9
- OCLC: 53393228

Scat is a teenage novel by Carl Hiaasen, published in 2009. Scat, Hiaasen's third young adult novel, tells the story of a missing teacher named Mrs. Bunny Starch, and how two of her students, Nick Waters and Marta Gonzalez, stumble across an illegal operation by the Diamond Energy corporation on protected land for panthers while trying to find her. The book is available in over 1,000 libraries and was well-received when it came out, with a positive review in The New York Times.

The cover of Scat was created by Isabel Warren-Lynch The audiobook of Scat was narrated by Ed Asner, who was nominated for a Grammy Award for Best Spoken Word Album for Children for the work.

Carl Hiaasen is the author of other notable children's fiction novels, including Flush, in over 2,500 libraries. and Hoot, in over 3,200 libraries. He received the Newbery Honor for Hoot in 2003. Like Hoot and Flush, Scat takes place in Florida.
