= Richard Melo =

American author and book reviewer (born 1968)

- Born: August 10, 1968 (age 58); San Francisco, California, U.S.
- Education: San Francisco State University
- Occupations: Novelist, critic
- Writing career
- Genre: Literary

Richard Melo (born August 10, 1968) is an American author and book reviewer. He is the author of the novels Happy Talk and Jokerman 8.

== Biography ==
Richard Melo was born in San Francisco, California and attended San Francisco State University. He currently lives in Portland, Oregon.

As a book critic since 2004, Melo has reviewed books by Thomas Pynchon, William Vollmann, Colson Whitehead, and Tom Robbins, among others. Melo is a member of the National Book Critics Circle and has written about Tom Wolfe for the NBCC blog.

His fiction has appeared in Willamette Week and Gobshite Quarterly. He began his career as a playwright with two productions appearing on the Mt. Hood Community College stage in the early 1990s. He is a graduate of the Creative Writing program at San Francisco State University.
