= Capital Gazette =

American publishing company

Capital Gazette Communications owned by Tribune Publishing through its subsidiary the Baltimore Sun Media Group, publishes the daily The Capital and the twice-weekly Maryland Gazette newspapers and the weeklies Bowie Blade-News and Crofton-West County Gazette. Its offices in Parole, Maryland, an unincorporated area of Anne Arundel County just outside Annapolis, were the site of the Capital Gazette shooting in June 2018. In August 2020, Tribune Publishing announced it was permanently closing the newsroom and would provide workspace as needed at The Baltimore Sun offices. In 2024, The Baltimore Sun was acquired by David Smith, the executive chairman of Sinclair Broadcast Group (SBGI).
