= Jokerman 8 =

2004 novel by Richard Melo

- Author: Richard Melo
- Language: English
- Genre: Literary fiction
- Publisher: Soft Skull Press
- Publication date: 2004
- Publication place: United States
- Media type: Print
- Pages: 280
- ISBN: 978-1-932360-34-9
- OCLC: 56128641
- Dewey Decimal: 813/.6 22
- LC Class: PS3613.E45 J65 2004

Jokerman 8, by Richard Melo, is a novel of that follows a group of college students whose lives weave in and out of the radical environmental movement. It was published in 2004 by Soft Skull Press and was reviewed in The Oregonian, The Believer, and other print and online periodicals. Set in the late 80s and early 90s, it follows the members of the radical Jokerman troupe as they spike trees, sink an Icelandic whaling vessel, and occupy a construction crane on the eve of the groundbreaking of an animal research facility on the University of California campus. The writing style recalls works by Ken Kesey and Tom Robbins, though its closest literary cousin is The Monkey Wrench Gang, by Edward Abbey. The novel is also noted for its evocation of The Beatles and U2 (in particular the album The Joshua Tree).
