= Basket Case (novel) =

2002 novel by Carl Hiaasen

- First edition cover
- Author: Carl Hiaasen
- Language: English
- Genre: Crime novel
- Publisher: Alfred A. Knopf (USA) & Macmillan (UK)
- Publication date: January 2002
- Publication place: United States
- Media type: Print (hardback & paperback)
- Pages: 336 pp (hardback edition)
- ISBN: 0-375-41107-0 (hardback edition) & ISBN 0-446-61193-X (paperback edition)
- OCLC: 47255262
- Dewey Decimal: 813/.54 21
- LC Class: PS3558.I217 B37 2002
- Preceded by: Sick Puppy
- Followed by: Skinny Dip

Basket Case, published in 2002, is the ninth novel by Carl Hiaasen. It is a crime novel set in Florida that centers on the death of singer Jimmy Stoma, the former lead man of "Jimmy and the Slut Puppies". This novel marks the first time Hiaasen used first-person point of view to deliver the novel. In previous works, he used third-person view.

In addition to being a murder mystery, the novel also explores a career in newspaper journalism, and is a screed against the downsizing of American newspapers and their corporate owners' emphasis on profitability over depth.

== Explanation of the novel's title ==
The book is named for the fictional Jimmy Stoma's song. While writing the book, Hiaasen collaborated with singer-songwriter Warren Zevon, a longtime friend. The song appears as the second track on Zevon's 2002 album My Ride's Here. It is quoted several times throughout the book, and is printed in its entirety at the end (credited to Jimmy Stoma and Warren Zevon).

== Plot summary ==
Jack Tagger Jr., an obituary writer for the South Florida Union-Register, becomes intrigued upon seeing a death notice for James Bradley Stomarti, a.k.a. Jimmy Stoma, the front man for the rock band Jimmy and the Slut Puppies. Jack interviews Jimmy's widow, pop singer Cleo Rio, who claims that he died in a diving accident and plugs her upcoming album Shipwrecked Heart, the title song of which she wrote with Jimmy. However, after the obituary is printed, Jimmy's sister Janet tells him Cleo lied: Jimmy was working on his own comeback album. Jack becomes suspicious when he sees Jimmy's body in a funeral home and finds that no autopsy was performed. However, the body is cremated before he can call for one.

Jack was an investigative reporter until he was demoted for publicly insulting the newspaper's publisher, Race Maggad III. His job of writing obituaries has made him become morbidly obsessed with death, especially his own. He obsesses about people who died at his age, and about the fate of his deceased father Jack Tagger Sr., who disappeared when Jack was young. Jack's mother refuses to say when he died, and Jack is paranoid about not living as long as his father did. These obsessions cost him his favorite girlfriend, Anne.

Despite the refusal by Jack's editor, Emma, to let him investigate Jimmy's death, he continues regardless. Parked outside Cleo's condominium one night, he sees her with a young male lover. Emma relents and gives Jack a week to investigate. Jack tracks down Jay Burns, the Slut Puppies' old keyboardist, and knows he is lying about something. Later that night, a burglar breaks into Jack's apartment and attacks him with the frozen corpse of a dead Savannah Monitor lizard kept in his freezer. Jack is beaten unconscious, but the burglar disappears. A few hours later, two police detectives show up and tell him Jay has been murdered.

With his apartment trashed, Jack stays with Emma. When the two search Jay's boat, an external hard drive is found beneath the false bottom of a scuba tank. Meanwhile, Jack is depressed to hear from Carla Candilla, Anne's teenaged daughter, that Anne is marrying a spy novelist. Meeting her at a club, he catches sight of Cleo's boyfriend, a man who calls himself "Loreal" and claims to be a record producer. Jack and Emma are alarmed when Janet disappears; Jack finds a small patch of blood on her carpet. With the help of Jack's friend, sportswriter Juan Rodriguez, Jack decrypts the hard drive and finds it contains master recordings for Jimmy's unfinished album. Listening to it, Jack is still baffled in looking for a motive for Jimmy's presumed murder.

To Jack's surprise, Emma spends the night with him at his apartment. A few days later, she excitedly tells him that Jimmy's bassist, Tito Negroponte, survived an attempted murder in Los Angeles. Jack flies there and interviews Tito, who puts his finger on why Cleo killed Jimmy: she wanted a song from his album, titled "Shipwrecked Heart," for herself. Jack listens to the song, telling Emma that Cleo is desperate to put out another successful song before she fades from the scene, and believes Jimmy's song was better than anything she could write. Still, Jack admits that he cannot prove that Cleo killed Jimmy.

Cleo's bodyguard kidnaps Emma, and Cleo demands the master in exchange for her. At Lake Okeechobee, Jack and Juan meet the bodyguard and Loreal, making the trade. The bodyguard tries to kill all of them but ends up upending the airboat he is driving, with fatal results for himself and Loreal. On Jack's 47th birthday the next day, his mother sends him a card and an obituary revealing that Jack Sr. died at age 46. He feels relieved to have lived longer than his father. Janet resurfaces, having fled Cleo's goons, and admits that she switched the tags on a pair of coffins at the funeral home, meaning Jimmy was actually buried in the wrong man's grave. At her request, the body is exhumed and a pathologist finds that Jimmy was drugged before he drowned. Cleo is convicted of murder; Jack sails back onto the front page covering the story while Jimmy's posthumous album is a success.

A subplot focuses on Jack's ongoing conflict with Maggad, and the ailing state of the Union-Register under Maggad's control. Jack finds an ally in MacArthur Polk, the newspaper's former publisher, who owns a large number of shares in Maggad's company. Maggad is desperate to buy the shares back before two foreign companies initiate a hostile takeover. Polk dies and names Jack as trustee of his shares, with instructions that Maggad can have the stock back only if he sells the Union-Register back to Polk's widow Ellen. After Maggad reluctantly agrees, Ellen reverses Maggad's practices. Emma is promoted, and the novel ends as she is trying to talk Jack back from his leave of absence from journalism.

== Characters ==
- Jack Tagger, journalist now relegated to the obituaries section
- Janet Thrush, Jimmy Stoma’s sister
- Cleo Rio, widow of Jimmy Stoma
- Emma, Jack's editor and lust interest
- James Bradley Stomarti, AKA Jimmy Stoma, the musician and the victim

== Allusions to actual history, geography and current science ==
- The novel is peppered with references to famous persons and the ages they died:
  - 27: Janis Joplin, Jimi Hendrix, Kurt Cobain, Brian Jones and Jim Morrison (a series of rock performers sometimes collectively referred to as "The 27 Club.")
  - 29: Hank Williams
  - 32: Keith Moon
  - 33: John Belushi
  - 36: Marilyn Monroe and Bob Marley
  - 39: John F. Kennedy Jr. and Dennis Wilson
  - 40: Franz Kafka, John Lennon, Jack London and Edgar Allan Poe
  - 41: Bebe the bottlenose dolphin, "one of seven who played Flipper on TV."
  - 42: Elvis Aaron Presley (mistakenly described as 46 at the time of his death);
  - 44: F. Scott Fitzgerald
  - 46: John F. Kennedy and George Orwell
  - 47: Jack Kerouac
  - 50: Steve McQueen
  - 52: Harry Nilsson
  - 70: Nelson Rockefeller
  - 82: Frank Sinatra
  - 87: Jacques-Yves Cousteau
  - 88: Orville Redenbacher
  - 92: Deng Xiaoping
- Jack names his pet savannah monitor lizard "Colonel Tom," because he acquired him on the anniversary of the death of Elvis Presley's manager, Colonel Tom Parker.
- Jack's favorite obituary headline of all time was that of Sir Seewoosagur Ramgoolam, just because of his name.
- According to his press clippings, Jimmy Stoma was once arrested for indecent exposure after appearing on stage wearing only a condom and a rubber mask likeness of Reverend Pat Robertson.
- Several real-life rock and pop stars appear as attendees at Jimmy's funeral, including Eddie and Alex Van Halen, Ray Cooper, Joan Jett, Courtney Love, Teena Marie, Ziggy Marley, Michael Penn, and Mike Campbell; Jett is also mentioned as a guest at Jimmy's wedding, along with Steven Tyler and John Entwistle.
- Jay Burns is unnerved to learn that he is the same age (40) as John Lennon when he died, and somewhat encouraged to hear from Jack that Billy Preston and Gregg Allman, two of his music idols, are still alive (Preston died in 2006, Allman in 2017, four and fifteen years after the novel's publication, respectively).
- Early in the novel, Jack considers Emma too soft-hearted to be a good journalist, especially when she objects to him writing obituaries that include mention of a deceased person's criminal past; he wryly reflects that, "if Emma had been running the show, Richard Nixon's obit would have dealt with Watergate parenthetically, if at all."
- When Emma asks Jack what the elderly MacArthur Polk wants from him, Jack wryly replies, "a front-page obituary making him sound like a cross between Ben Bradlee and St. Francis of Assisi";
- Jack privately reflects that he went into journalism because he wanted to emulate Bob Woodward or Sy Hersh;
- Jack is apprehensive about reading his father's obituary, since some persons "earn" mention in the newspaper for egregious crimes, recalling that "Bruno Hauptmann got quite a boisterous send-off in the media[.]"
- There appear to be some similarities between the plotline and certain theories involving the death of Kurt Cobain, particularly the conspiracy theory that Courtney Love murdered Cobain and all the songs on her "Live Through This" album were written by him.
- The lack of an autopsy regarding Jimmy Stoma may be a reference to Jim Morrison since no autopsy was ever conducted on him.
- Jack is amused to hear from Janet that the original title of Jimmy's title song "Shipwrecked Heart" was "Kate, You Bitch", reflecting that the Beatles' song "Yesterday" might not have become "the most covered song in music history" had it been released under its working title, "Scrambled Eggs."
- Race Maggad III is seen as a thinly veiled caricature of Tony Ridder, who was CEO of Knight-Ridder, the owner of the Miami Herald, Hiaasen's own paper. Hiaasen's Jack Tagger has a wide range of epithets for Maggad, the kindest of which is "imposter," and the most invective of which are "money-grubbing yupster twit" and "vapid yuppie puke." Like Maggad in the novel, Tony Ridder was criticized for attempting to boost Knight-Ridder's profits by cutting down the staffs of its newspapers. It was also under Ridder that KR moved its corporate headquarters from Miami to San Jose, California. Hiaasen incorporates both of these in the novel:
  - “Race Maggad is aiming for annual profits of twenty-five percent, a margin that would be the envy of most heroin pushers.”
  - “The priorities of young Race Maggad III became clear when, out of the blue, he announced that Maggad-Feist would be moving its corporate headquarters from Milwaukee to San Diego. A corporate press release claimed that the reason for the move was to capitalize on the dynamic, high-tech workforce in California. The truth is more banal: Race Maggad wanted to live in a climate where he could drive his German sports cars year-round, far from the ravages of Wisconsin winters. The salt damage to his Carrera alone was rumored to be in the five figures."

== Proposed film and TV adaptations ==
On April 4, 2002, Michael Tolken was hired to adapt the novel into a feature film for Fox 2000. On December 11, 2013, Rob Reiner was set to produce a television series adaptation of the novel for Spike TV.
