= Flush (novel) =

2005 novel by Carl Hiaasen

- First edition cover
- Author: Carl Hiaasen
- Language: English
- Genre: Realistic Fiction
- Published: 13 Sep 2005 Alfred A. Knopf
- Publication place: United States
- Media type: Print (book)
- Pages: 263
- ISBN: 0-375-92182-6
- OCLC: 53393228

Flush is a young adult novel by Carl Hiaasen, first published in 2005 and set in Florida. It is his second young adult novel, after Hoot and has a similar plot to Hoot but a different cast and is not a continuation or sequel. The plot centers around Noah Underwood, a boy whose father enlists his help to catch a repeat environmental offender in the act.

== Summary ==
The narrator of the story is a teenaged boy name Noah Underwood. Noah's father, Paine, a passionate environmentalist, has been arrested for sinking the Coral Queen, a casino boat operated by "Dusty" Muleman, whom Paine believes has been illegally dumping sewage from the boat's holding tank into the ocean at night. However, Noah and his younger sister Abbey see that the Coral Queen will be repaired and back in business by the end of the week. While Paine is publicizing his actions to the media, Noah is worried when Abbey hears their mother, Donna, talking about filing for divorce and tells Noah.

Paine asks for Noah's help in getting a witness statement from Charles "Lice" Peeking, a former mate on the Coral Queen. Lice is noncommittal, but he later disappears, and his girlfriend Shelly (Dusty's ex) offers to help, believing that Dusty may have had Lice killed.

Abbey tries to take matters into her own hands and sneaks out of the house at night with the family's video camera to try to record Dusty Muleman dumping the boat's sewage into the marina. However, the footage is too dark and blurry to prove anything.

Realizing the problem is that no one has ever been able to trace the sewage spills directly to the Coral Queen, Noah, Abbey, and Shelly come up with a plan, code-named "Operation Royal Flush": Shelly, who works on the Coral Queen as a bartender, will flush food coloring down the Coral Queen's toilets, dyeing the sewage and marking a trail in the water when it gets dumped. When Shelly points out that there is too much dye for one person to squeeze out, Noah decides to sneak on board with half the dye and flush it from a different toilet.

The plan goes off nearly perfectly, with Abbey manning a getaway boat. But just as they are escaping the marina, their engine stalls, and they are found by Dusty's security guards. One of them points a gun at the kids, but they are saved by the appearance of a strange old man. Noah and Abbey's elation fades when their outboard motor breaks down completely, and the current carries them away from shore. They are rescued in the morning by Paine, accompanied by the old man, whom Paine introduces as their long-lost Grandpa Bobby.

Grandpa Bobby says he has been down in South America, trying to track down the men who attempted to kill him and stole his fishing boat. While drinking at a bar in Colombia, he saw a news report about Paine's arrest and made his way back to Florida.

Thanks to the dye marking, the Coast Guard shuts down the Coral Queen immediately. When Noah and Abbey go to thank Shelly, they are surprised to find that Lice Peeking wasn't killed or kidnapped, just scared into running away.

About a month later, Paine gives Noah bad news: Dusty settled his pollution case for a measly fine and is re-opening the Coral Queen that night with a big party.

After the party, the Coral Queen is burned down, and Paine is immediately suspected of arson. Paine, however, has an alibi: he broke both his hands punching walls in rage over the paltry fine, his hands are encased in large plaster casts that make it impossible for him to hold a match, and a hospital receipt shows that he was treated for fractures, not burns, and the casts were applied before the ship was burned. Subsequent investigation reveals that Dusty's delinquent son, Jasper Jr., and his friend Bull were the culprits, having tried smoking some of Dusty's prized Cuban cigars in the hold near several boxes of fireworks. Even worse for Dusty, investigators find evidence in the wreckage that Dusty had been skimming from the gambling boat's profits. Furious, his partners sue him for embezzlement while he is also audited by the IRS.

The rest of the family go on a cruise and finally see the green flash, ending the story.

== Reception ==
Publishers Weekly referred to Flush as an "action-packed mystery" with "a colorful cast of dastardly villains and eccentric heroes, along with [Hiaasen's] signature environmental themes". Booklist's Stephanie Zvirin added that the novel includes other elements from Hiaasen's previous writing: "Florida local color, oddball adults (buxom and brawny), and a delightful quirkiness". Kirkus Reviews also recognized the similarities with previous characters. They noted, however, that "the whole here is rather less than the sum of its parts, as the plot takes some time to take off and Noah’s first-person narration necessarily limits the loony heights (or depths) Hiaasen can attain in plumbing the psyches of his villains." Similarly, Zvirin indicated that "the sparkle that catapulted Hoot into the limelight isn't quite as brilliant here".

Publishers Weekly added to this critique, noting that "much of this adventure (including the identity of the "old pirate") is predictable". Zvirin also pointed out "an old-fashioned deus ex machina" that "interrupts an otherwise believable setup". School Library Journal's Joel Shoemaker added, "The plot would practically disappear if any one of the major characters had a cell phone". Despite these concerns, Zvirin concluded, "There's plenty to like in this yarn" as the characters' "amateur sleuthing puts [them] into some mildly suspenseful, occasionally amusing, situations". Similarly, Publishers Weekly found that "Hiaasen creates enough interesting plot twists to keep the pages turning".

Shoemaker concluded their review by calling Flush a "quick-reading, fun, family adventure [that] harkens back to the Hardy Boys in its simplicity and quirky characters".

Booklist also reviewed the audiobook narrated by Michael Welch.
