= The Capital =

Newspaper in Annapolis, Maryland

Capital Gazette
- Type: Daily newspaper
- Format: Broadsheet
- Owner: Baltimore Sun Media/JTF Publications LLC
- Publisher: Triffon G. Alatzas
- Editor: Jacob Baumgart
- Photo editor: J. Bill
- Founded: 1884; 142 years ago (as Evening Capital)
- Headquarters: Baltimore, Maryland, U.S.
- Circulation: 30,274 daily 35,155 Sunday
- Website: capitalgazette.com

The Capital (also known as Capital Gazette as its online nameplate and informally, while the Sunday edition is called The Sunday Capital) is a daily newspaper published by Capital Gazette Communications in Annapolis, Maryland, to serve the city of Annapolis, much of Anne Arundel County, and neighboring Kent Island in Queen Anne's County. First published as the Evening Capital on May 12, 1884, the newspaper switched to mornings on March 9, 2015.

The company has moved headquarters seven times, including from 3 Church Circle to 213 West Street in 1948, to 2000 Capital Drive in 1987, to Gibralter Road after that, and to 888 Bestgate Road in 2014.

The Capital was acquired by The Baltimore Sun Media Group in 2014.

== History ==
The newspaper was founded in 1884 as the Evening Capital and operated under this name until June 20, 1981, when it was shortened to just The Capital. Its founder was William M. Abbott, a former compositor for The Baltimore Sun, who employed his daughter Emma Abbott Gage as the newspaper's editor and his son Charles B. Abbott as business manager.

In 1910, Abbott purchased the weekly Maryland Gazette from Col. Phillip E. Porter and merged the paper with his Capital, creating the Evening Capital and Maryland Gazette. In the years following the Civil War, Annapolis faded economically, and the pages of the Evening Capital mostly reflected the local happenings of a sleepy, provincial town. During the early 20th century, the expansion of the nearby United States Naval Academy was recorded in the paper as a source of both optimism and concern for local citizens. Abbott and his family handed over ownership of the paper to Ridgely P. Melvin in 1919, and it reverted to its original name of Evening Capital in 1922. Melvin subsequently sold the Capital to the Capital-Gazette Press Company in 1926.

For much of the 20th century, the Capital was edited by Elmer Jackson, Jr., who had been appointed in 1931. In 1959, it added a Saturday morning edition.

In 1967, the newspaper and its sisters were sold to Philip Merrill and Landmark Communications, which shared ownership. Jackson was replaced as editor. Under this ownership, which lasted until 2007, the Capital saw great success, with its circulation nearly tripling. After Merrill's death in 2006, Landmark obtained full ownership of the paper; it kept this ownership until 2014, when the Capital and its related holdings were sold to the Baltimore Sun Media Group, a tronc company.

Its change to a seven-day-a-week morning paper was announced on February 8, 2015, and implemented on March 9.

As of 2018, The Capital had a daily circulation around 33,000. The papers are printed on a computerized high-speed Goss International Headliner press.

== Shooting ==
On June 28, 2018, a man killed five employees at the Capital Gazette offices in Annapolis: journalists Rob Hiaasen, Wendi Winters, Gerald Fischman, and John McNamara, and sales assistant Rebecca Smith.

The staff of The Capital and its parent company were subsequently chosen by Time as Person of the Year 2018, as one of "The Guardians," a collection of journalists from around the world in their fight against the "War on Truth". On April 15, 2019, The Capital received a Pulitzer Prize Special Citation to "...honor the journalists, staff, and editorial board of the Capital Gazette, Annapolis, Maryland, for their courageous response to the largest killing of journalists in U.S. history in their newsroom on June 28, 2018, and for demonstrating unflagging commitment to covering the news and serving their community at a time of unspeakable grief."
