= Hoot (novel) =

2002 novel by Carl Hiaasen

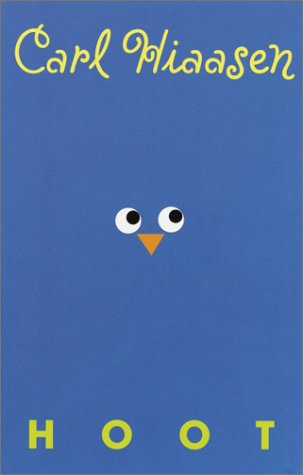
- Cover of Hoot
- Author: Carl Hiaasen
- Language: English
- Genre: Realistic Fiction
- Published: 2002 Alfred A. Knopf
- Publication place: United States
- Media type: Print
- Pages: 292
- ISBN: 0-330-41529-8
- OCLC: 53393228

Hoot is a 2002 children's mystery/suspense novel by Carl Hiaasen. The story takes place in Florida, where new arrival Roy makes two oddball friends and a bad enemy. Roy joins an effort to stop construction of a pancake house which would destroy a colony of burrowing owls who live on the site. The book won a Newbery Honor award in 2003.

== Plot ==
The main character, Roy Eberhardt, moves from Montana to Florida and into the fictional coastal town of Coconut Cove, where a 7th grader, Dana Matherson, starts to bully him and call him, "Cowgirl". On the bus to school, Roy sees a boy running barefoot outside. Roy tries to leave the bus, but Dana viciously chokes and strangles him. He escapes after punching Dana in the face, breaking his nose, and then exiting the bus. However, Roy can't catch the running boy because a golf ball hits Roy in the head. Vice-Principal Viola Hennepin suspends Roy from the bus for two weeks and orders him to write an apology to Dana. Roy calls for a truce, but Dana declines this.

A restaurant called Mother Paula's All-American Pancake House decides to build a franchise in Coconut Cove, but vandalism delays the work. Roy learns the running boy is the vandal known as "Mullet Fingers" and they become friends. Mullet Fingers vandalizes and delays construction overseen by Chuck Muckle to save the endangered burrowing owls on the site.

The construction foreman, Leroy "Curly" Branitt, denies the owls' existence. Roy helps Mullet Fingers prove otherwise and tells his class including Beatrice Leep about the owls, and how construction will kill the endangered species, and encourages them to join him in protests.

Roy and his classmates attend the groundbreaking and expose the truth. This includes the company's illegal removal of an environmental impact statement from their files. This revelation saves the owls and their habitat. Mother Paula's All-American Pancake House blames former employees and promises to preserve the property as an owl sanctuary. Muckle is sent to anger management for attacking a reporter. Dana is later arrested and sentenced to a detention camp as punishment for being mean to Roy. Mullet Fingers's mother sees him protesting with Roy and his classmates and goes in front of all the cameras and attempts to hog all the attention.

Two days later, Mullet Fingers climbs out his home's bathroom window and is mistaken for a burglar. Mullet Fingers's mother lies to the police and says he stole a very valuable toe ring. They believe her and he's sent to a juvenile detention center where he escapes. In the last chapter, Roy discovers that Mullet Fingers's real name is Napoleon Bridger Leep.

== Characters ==
- Roy Andrew Eberhardt – The new kid at Trace Middle School and the main protagonist, who quickly makes an enemy of the school bully, Dana Matherson, and makes two unusual friends, Beatrice Leep and her truant step-brother "Mullet Fingers".
- Beatrice Leep – "A tall girl with curly blond hair and red-framed glasses." She is described as sinewy, tomboyish and aggressive, and is a member of the soccer team. At Trace Middle School, she's known as "Beatrice The Bear."
- "Mullet Fingers"/Napoleon Bridger – Beatrice's stepbrother, initially known to Roy as the mysterious barefoot kid. His name is not given until the final chapter; the nickname "Mullet Fingers" refers to his ability to catch a mullet with his bare hands. He has a bad relationship with his mother, who had sent him to military school. Napoleon usually runs away from his family to live on his own.
- Officer David Delinko – A police officer in the Coconut Cove Police Department who is investigating the vandalism at the Mother Paula's All-American Pancake House construction site. Dutiful and ambitious, he develops sympathy for the owls and aids the kids.
- Leroy "Curly" Branitt – The construction foreman on the Mother Paula's Pancake House construction site, where all of the mysterious vandalism happens. Officer Delinko notes the irony of his nickname, as he is "bald as a beach ball". He is also "cranky," "unsmiling," and suspicious of everyone.
- Dana Matherson – A boy who torments underclassmen as the typical bully. Just like other bullies, he is an antagonist who finds inflicting pain on others quite pleasurable. His mother fights with him and is a big bully just like him while his father seems to try to discipline him. He bullies Roy and calls him, "Cowgirl". Dana was hit in the nose by Roy in an earlier chapter and doesn't forget it. Despite the fact that Roy tries to make a truce with him, Dana never learns sense; this eventually leads to Dana paying the price when he is sent to a detention center as punishment for his mean attitude.
- Andrew and Lizzy Eberhardt – Roy's parents. They are sensible and supportive. Mr. Eberhardt works in the federal Department of Justice, and helps Roy by checking Mother Paula's building permits. Mrs. Eberhardt likes yoga and is protective of Roy.
- Chuck E. Muckle – The "vice president of Corporate Relations" at Mother Paula's All-American Pancake House, and the novel's primary antagonist. He is portrayed as an arrogant, manipulative, ruthless, and corrupt executive, who pretends owls do not live on the site so he can bulldoze over their homes.
- Leon and Lonna Leep – A couple majorly contrasting in personality, Mr. Leep is Beatrice's decent but apathetic father, an ex-NBA player. He is remarried to a temperamental, mean-tempered, narcissistic waitress, Lonna Leep, who wants all the attention she can get, and has a volatile terrible relationship with Mullet Fingers, her son.
- Kimberly Lou Dixon – An actress and former Miss America runner-up who plays Mother Paula, the spokesperson and corporate mascot for Mother Paula's All-American Pancake House.
- Garrett – Roy's best and, at first, only friend at Trace Middle School. A skateboarder, popular in school, the king of phony farts, and a D student. His mother is also the school counselor.
- Viola Hennepin – The vice principal at Trace Middle School. She attempts to discipline Roy on several occasions such as suspending him from the school bus for two weeks, except she knows Dana strangled him. She is described as having one long jet-black hair protruding out of her upper lip; which later mysteriously becomes blonde.

== Publication history ==
Carl Hiaasen started writing children's books when he realized that the other novels that he had written were too adult for his nieces and nephews. In writing his first young adult novel, Hiaasen faced some challenges: "The biggest challenge was trying not to subconsciously 'write down' for young readers." Hiaasen said, "When I was creating the character in Hoot, I'm sure I stole liberally from my pre-adolescence."

== Themes ==
The themes in the novel are friendship, teamwork, growing up, corruption, parental love, kinship, environmentalism and integrity. The character goes through different adventures to get here.

== Critical reception ==
The Horn Book Magazine reviews read, “Hoot is quintessential Hiaasen … peopled with original and wacky characters… Not consistently a hoot, but worthy of a holler. Hiaasen's first YA book succeeds as a humorous diversion.” Publishers Weekly claims that "With a Florida setting and pro-environment, anti-development message, Hiaasen returns to familiar turf for his first novel for young readers… Several suspenseful scenes, along with dollops of humor, help make this quite a hoot indeed."

== Adaptations ==
A film adaptation of the book was released in May 2006, starring Luke Wilson as Officer Delinko, Logan Lerman as Roy Eberhart, Brie Larson as Beatrice Leep, Tim Blake Nelson as Leroy Brannit, Neil Flynn as Mr. Eberhart, Robert Wagner as Mayor Grandy, Cody Linley as Napoleon Leep, and Clark Gregg as Chuck Muckle while Hiaasen portrays Muckle's assistant Felix. Hiaasen and Wil Shriner, the director and script-writer, "fought long and hard to stay truthful to the book."
