= Tribune Publishing =

American publishing company

Tribune Publishing Company
- Formerly: Tronc, Inc. (2016–2018)
- Type: Subsidiary
- Traded as: Nasdaq: TRNC (2017–2018); Nasdaq: TPCO (2018–2021)
- ISIN: US89609W1071
- Industry: Newspapers and commuter tabloids
- Genre: Publishing
- Founded: June 10, 1847 (179 years ago) (original founding, as the Chicago Daily Tribune); August 4, 2014 (12 years ago) (as Tribune Publishing Company)
- Headquarters: Chicago, Illinois, U.S.
- Key people: Philip Franklin (chairman); Heath Freeman (CEO and president); Mike Lavey (acting Chief Financial Officer); Colin McMahon (Chief Content Officer and Editor-in-Chief of Chicago Tribune); Jean Nechvatal (VP of Human Resources)
- Revenue: ▼US$983.1 million (2019)
- Net income: ▲US$4.8 million (2019)
- Total assets: ▼US$682.3 million (2019)
- Number of employees: 4,114 (2019)
- Parent: Tribune Company (1847–2014); Alden Global Capital (2021–present)
- Website: tribpub.com

Tribune Publishing Company (briefly Tronc, Inc.) is an American newspaper print and online media publishing company. The company, which was acquired by Alden Global Capital in May 2021, has a portfolio that includes the Chicago Tribune, the Orlando Sentinel, South Florida's Sun-Sentinel, The Virginian-Pilot, the Hartford Courant, additional titles in Pennsylvania and Virginia, syndication operations, and websites. It also publishes several local newspapers in its metropolitan regions, which are organized in subsidiary groups.

Incorporated in 1847 with the founding of the Chicago Tribune, Tribune Publishing operated as a division of the Tribune Company, a Chicago-based multimedia conglomerate, until it was spun off into a separate public company in August 2014.

The company was sold to the hedge fund Alden Global Capital in May 2021. Prior to this acquisition, Tribune Publishing was the nation's third-largest newspaper publisher (behind Gannett and the McClatchy Company), with eleven daily newspapers and commuter tabloids throughout the United States. With the acquisition, Alden Global Capital became the second-largest newspaper publisher in the United States.

== History ==
=== Early history ===
Tribune Publishing's history dates back to 1847, when the Chicago Tribune (for which the company and its former parent, Tribune Media, are named) published its first edition on June 10 of that year, in a one-room plant at LaSalle and Lake Streets in Chicago. The Tribune constructed its first building, a four-story structure at Dearborn and Madison streets, in 1869; however the building was destroyed, along with most of the city, by the Great Chicago Fire in October 1871. The Tribune resumed printing two days later with an editorial declaring "Chicago Shall Rise Again". The newspaper's editor and part-owner, Joseph Medill, was elected mayor and led the city's reconstruction. A native Ohioan who first acquired an interest in the Tribune in 1855, Medill gained full control of the newspaper in 1874 and ran it until his death in 1899.

Medill's two grandsons, cousins Robert R. McCormick and Joseph Medill Patterson, assumed leadership of the company in 1911. That same year, the Chicago Tribune's first newsprint mill opened in Thorold, Ontario, Canada. The mill marked the beginnings of the Canadian newsprint producer later known as QUNO, in which Tribune held an investment interest until 1995. The Chicago Tribune-New York News Syndicate was formed in 1918, leading to Joseph Patterson's establishment of the company's second newspaper, the New York Daily News on June 26, 1919. Tribune's ownership of the New York City tabloid was considered "interlocking" due to an agreement between McCormick and Patterson.

=== Expansion ===
The company acquired the Fort Lauderdale-based Sun-Sentinel newspaper in 1963; this was later followed by its purchase of the Orlando Sentinel in 1965. In 1973, the company began sharing stories among 25 subscriber newspapers via the newly formed news service, the Knight News Wire. By 1990, this service was known as Knight-Ridder/Tribune and provided graphics, photo, and news content to its member newspapers. KRT became McClatchy-Tribune Information Services, which is owned by the Tribune Company and McClatchy, when The McClatchy Company purchased Knight-Ridder Inc. in 2006. Tribune later acquired the Newport News, Virginia-based Daily Press in 1986. In the wake of a dispute with some of its labor unions, the New York Daily News was sold to British businessman Robert Maxwell in 1991.

In June 2000, Tribune acquired the Los Angeles-based Times Mirror Company in a merger deal worth $8.3 billion, which was the largest acquisition in the history of the newspaper industry. The merger added seven daily newspapers to Tribune's portfolio, including the Los Angeles Times, the Long Island-based Newsday, The Baltimore Sun, and the Hartford Courant. Tribune Media Net, the national advertising sales organization of Tribune Publishing, was established in 2000 to take advantage of the company's expanded scale and scope.

Later in the decade, Tribune launched daily newspapers targeting urban commuters, including the Chicago Tribune's RedEye edition in 2002, followed by an investment in AM New York one year later. In 2006, Tribune acquired the minority equity interest in AM New York, giving it full ownership of the newspaper. The company sold both Newsday and AM New York to Cablevision Systems Corporation in 2008, with the sale of the latter paper closing on July 29 of that year.

=== Takeover by Sam Zell and bankruptcy ===
On April 2, 2007, Chicago-based investor Sam Zell announced plans to buy out the Tribune Company for $34.00 a share, totaling $8.2 billion, with intentions to take the company private. The deal was approved by 97% of the company's shareholders on August 21, 2007. Privatization of the Tribune Company occurred on December 20, 2007, with Tribune's stock listing being terminated at the close of the trading day.

On December 8, 2008, faced with a high debt load totaling $13 billion, related to the company's leveraged buyout and subsequent privatization, and a sharp downturn in newspaper advertising revenue, Tribune filed for Chapter 11 bankruptcy protection in what was the largest bankruptcy in the history of the American media industry. Company plans called for it to emerge from bankruptcy by May 31, 2010, but the company would end up in protracted bankruptcy proceedings for four years.

On July 13, 2012, the Tribune Company received approval of a reorganization plan to allow the company to emerge from Chapter 11 bankruptcy protection in a Delaware bankruptcy court. Oaktree Capital Management, JPMorgan Chase and Angelo, Gordon & Co., which were the company's senior debt holders, assumed control of Tribune's properties upon the company's exit from bankruptcy on December 31, 2012.

=== Spin-off of publishing unit ===
On February 26, 2013, Tribune reportedly hired investment firms Evercore Partners and J.P. Morgan & Co. to oversee the sale of its newspapers. On July 10, 2013, Tribune announced that it would split into two companies, spinning off its publishing division into the Tribune Publishing Company. Its broadcasting, digital media and other assets (including GraceNote) would remain with the Tribune Company. On November 20, 2013, Tribune announced it would cut 700 jobs from its newspaper properties due to declining advertising revenues.

On June 17, 2014, in a presentation for lenders, Tribune revealed that it had set August 4 as the target date for its spin-off of Tribune Publishing. The split was finalized on the target date, with the publishing arm being spun out as Tribune Publishing Company, and its former parent company being renamed Tribune Media.

=== Post spin-off ===
Tribune Publishing acquired six suburban daily and 32 weekly newspapers in the Chicago Metropolitan Area in October 2014. These acquisitions were similar in strategy to earlier acquisitions in the state of Maryland, expanding its footprint in its eight "core markets".

On May 7, 2015, Tribune Publishing announced that it had reached a deal to acquire the San Diego Union-Tribune and its associated properties for $85 million, ending the paper's 146 years of private ownership. Following the completion of the acquisition, the Union-Tribune and the Los Angeles Times became part of a new operating entity known as the California News Group, led by Times publisher and CEO Timothy E. Ryan. The two California papers retained distinct operations, but sought a synergy with content sharing between them.

In April 2016, Gannett Company (which, much like Tribune, had spun out its broadcasting properties into a separate firm to focus on publishing assets) made an unsolicited bid to acquire Tribune Publishing for $12.25 per-share, or around $400 million. This deal was rejected by Tribune's shareholders in May 2016; in turn, Gannett increased its offer to around $15 per-share (around $800 million). On May 17, 2016, Tribune chairman Michael Ferro stated that he intended to make a bid to acquire Gannett instead.

On November 1, 2016, Gannett announced that it would no longer pursue its acquisition of the company.

=== Tronc era ===
In June 2016, Tribune Publishing announced that it would change its name to Tronc, Inc., an abbreviation of "Tribune online content". The name change came amid an increased push towards digital publishing by the company; chief technology officer Malcolm CasSelle and chief digital officer Anne Vasquez announced initiatives in content optimization, machine learning, artificial intelligence, and a goal to have video constitute half of its overall content by 2017, in an effort to increase reader engagement and ad revenue. The company also introduced a new slogan, "From Pixels to Pulitzers".

The new name was widely ridiculed by the press and on social media, while an accompanying promotional video was criticized for being reliant on buzzwords and lacking substance. When discussing the rebrand in a Last Week Tonight segment on U.S. news media, John Oliver argued that "tronc" sounded like "the noise an ejaculating elephant makes or, more appropriately, the sound of a stack of print newspapers being thrown into a dumpster."

On March 13, 2017, Tronc announced that it would license Arc, the content management system of The Washington Post. On September 4, 2017, Tronc announced that it had acquired the New York Daily News. Having been established in 1919 by the Chicago Tribune-New York News Syndicate, the Daily News had been owned by the Tribune Company before its sale to Robert Maxwell in 1991 and then to Mortimer Zuckerman in 1993. Tronc purchased the Daily News for $1 plus the assumption of its liabilities.

In February 2018, Tronc announced an agreement to sell the Los Angeles Times and the San Diego Union-Tribune to Patrick Soon-Shiong for $500 million, plus the assumption of $90 million in pension liabilities. On March 18, 2018, Ferro stepped down as a board member amid allegations of sexual misconduct. His spot on the board was replaced by CEO Justin Dearborn.

In July 2018, the company moved their headquarters from Tribune Tower several blocks south to One Prudential Plaza. On July 23, 2018, Tronc would lay off roughly half of the Daily News's staff, including editor-in-chief, Jim Rich (who was replaced by Robert York of Tronc sister publication The Morning Call).

=== Tribune Publishing ===
On June 19, 2018, it was reported that Tronc would change its name back to Tribune Publishing; the change officially took effect on October 9, 2018.

A cyberattack on Tribune Publishing in December 2018 caused printing and delivery issues for several newspapers, including the Baltimore Sun, Los Angeles Times, and Chicago Tribune. It is thought that the malware, which was directed at back-office systems, came from somewhere outside of the United States.

In January 2019, Tribune announced that industry veteran Timothy P. Knight would succeed Justin Dearborn as CEO. Dearborn had served as CEO since 2016. The company's board of directors also elected former Congressman and chairman of the House Rules Committee David Dreier to succeed Dearborn as chairman.

In December 2019, Alden Global Capital, a New York City-based hedge fund, acquired a 32% stake in shares of Tribune Publishing Company.

In February 2020, Dreier and Knight stepped down as chairman and CEO, respectively. Knight was replaced by the chief financial officer, Terry Jimenez.

In 2020, during the COVID-19 pandemic, Tribune Publishing closed a number of its papers' newsrooms, including those of: the New York Daily News, The Morning Call, the Orlando Sentinel, the Carroll County Times, the Capital Gazette and the Hartford Courant.

=== Acquisition by Alden ===
Tribune Publishing was acquired by hedge fund Alden Global Capital (Alden) for $635 million, giving its final approval on May 21, 2021, with the transaction officially closing on May 25, 2021, taking the company private.

In December 2019, Alden acquired a 32% stake in shares of Tribune Publishing Company. Most of its stake was purchased from Michael Ferro at $13 a share. Considering what it paid for other tranches, the average price Alden paid for its shares of Tribune Publishing stock is around $12.75. It is offering $17.25/share. Tribune Publishing announced in February 2021 that it had agreed to be wholly acquired by Alden, and the final approval came in May.

A key element in concluding the sale to Alden was the decision by Patrick Soon-Shiong, who owned 24% of the company's stock, to abstain from the May 21 shareholder vote.

In early April 2021, Tribune Publishing announced that it has entered into serious discussions with an alternative pair of suitors for an amount higher than its deal with Alden. The new bidders were Stewart W. Bainum Jr. and Hansjörg Wyss. This deal would have amounted to an overall bid of $680 million, or $18.50/share, in contrast to the $635 million offer from Alden.

The Bainum/Wyss acquisition offer came about when Bainum's offer to purchase the Baltimore Sun from Alden once it completed its acquisition of Tribune Publishing fell apart. The Sun deal fell apart on March 12 when Bainum became convinced that Alden was smuggling extra costs and fees into its deal with him that violated what he thought he had agreed to. He had agreed to purchase the Sun for $65 million, along with payments on a transitional-services agreement. The transitional-services agreement would have involved payments from the Sun to Alden for logistical aspects of running the business including its payroll and circulation departments and national and digital sales unit. Bainum believed he had negotiated a deal for two years of transitional services, with a 30-day exit clause. Instead, he was asked to commit to a five-year agreement with no possibility of an early exit. Bainum took umbrage and, instead, put together a competing bid to purchase the entirety of Tribune Publishing.

Poynter.org observed that fears about the potential Alden acquisition may have obscured that staffing levels at Tribune Publishing's nine metropolitan newspapers fell 30.4% from 2019 to 2020. They write, "Employees and local readers are concerned that Alden would make deep cuts to Tribune if it bought the company. But it seems that's already happening."

Hansjörg Wyss announced the third week of April that he was withdrawing from acquisition talks. Shortly thereafter, Tribune Publishing said that it was ending its conversations with Stewart W. Bainum Jr. because they believed that this possible deal could not reasonably be expected, in the absence of Wyss, to lead to a "superior proposal". Wyss had been expected to contribute $505 million to the transaction, with $100 million coming from Bainum.

Bainum had until the end of the first week in May to submit a better proposal. Tribune Publishing's shareholders voted on a final deal on May 21. Bainum's difficulty in putting together a deal was said to be his inability to find a purchaser for the Chicago Tribune, which is the largest and most expensive of the metropolitan daily newspapers owned by Tribune Publishing. In the wake of the May 21 finalized sale, Bainum expressed continued interest in purchasing the Baltimore Sun and indicated that if he is unable to do so, he might invest a significant sum in creating a digital alternative.

Immediately upon the close of the transaction, the New York Daily News was transferred by Alden to a separate company, Daily News Enterprises, also owned by Alden.

On January 15, 2024, the company sold The Baltimore Sun to David D. Smith, executive chairman of Sinclair Broadcast Group. The purchase price was not immediately disclosed.

In February 2024, Tribune Publishing announced it will layoff about 200 employees from the Freedom Center printing plant in Chicago. The plant will close and be demolished as the property was sold to be used as the site of a casino. Printing operations will be moved to the Paddock Printing Center in Schaumburg, which was acquired by a subsidiary of Alden in May 2023.

== Publications owned ==
=== Current ===
==== Newspapers ====
- Chicago Tribune (Chicago, Illinois)
  - Daily Southtown (Chicago, Illinois)
  - Post-Tribune (Merrillville, Indiana)
  - Naperville Sun (Naperville, Illinois)
  - Elgin Courier-News (Elgin, Illinois)
  - The Beacon-News (Aurora, Illinois)
  - Lake County News-Sun (Gurnee, Illinois)
  - Pioneer Press
    - Barrington Courier-Review
    - Buffalo Grove Countryside
    - Deerfield Review
    - The Doings Clarendon Hills
    - The Doings Hinsdale
    - The Doings La Grange
    - The Doings Oak Brook
    - The Doings Weekly
    - The Doings Western Springs
    - Elm Leaves
    - Evanston Review
    - Forest Leaves
    - Franklin Park Herald Journal
    - Glencoe News
    - Glenview Announcements
    - Highland Park News
    - Lake Forester
    - Lake Zurich Courier
    - Libertyville Review
    - Lincolnshire Review
    - Lincolnwood Review
    - Morton Grove Champion
    - Mundelein Review
    - Niles Herald-Spectator
    - Norridge Harwood Heights News
    - Northbrook Star
    - Oak Leaves
    - Park Ridge Herald Advocate
    - Skokie Review
    - Vernon Hills Review
    - Wilmette Life
    - Winnetka Talk
- Daily Herald (Arlington Heights, Illinois)
- Sun Sentinel (Fort Lauderdale, Florida)
  - Boca Times (Boca Raton, Florida; Highland Beach, Florida)
  - El Sentinel del Sur de la Florida (Fort Lauderdale, Florida)
  - Florida Jewish Journal
  - Delray Sun (Delray Beach, Florida; Gulf Stream, Florida)
  - Gateway Gazette (Boynton Beach, Florida; Lantana, Florida; Hypoluxo, Florida; Atlantis, Florida; South Palm Beach, Florida; Ocean Ridge, Florida; Manalapan, Florida; Briny Breezes, Florida)
  - Glades Gazette (Miramar, Florida; Pembroke Pines, Florida; Weston, Florida; Southwest Ranches, Florida)
  - Pier Review (Deerfield Beach, Florida; Pompano Beach, Florida; Lighthouse Point, Florida; Hillsboro Beach, Florida)
  - Riverside Times (Fort Lauderdale, Florida; Oakland Park, Florida; Wilton Manors, Florida; Lauderdale-by-the-Sea, Florida; Sea Ranch Lakes, Florida)
  - Sawgrass Sun (Plantation, Florida; Sunrise, Florida; Lauderhill, Florida; Tamarac, Florida; North Lauderdale, Florida; Lauderdale Lakes, Florida)
  - The Forum (Coral Springs, Florida; Coconut Creek, Florida; Margate, Florida; North Lauderdale, Florida; Parkland, Florida)
  - The Trailblazer (Davie, Florida; Cooper City, Florida; Southwest Ranches, Florida)
  - The Villager (Wellington, Florida; Royal Palm Beach, Florida; Greenacres, Florida; Loxahatchee Groves, Florida; Westlake, Florida; The Acreage, Florida)
  - West Boca Times (West Boca Raton, Florida)
- Orlando Sentinel (Orlando, Florida)
  - El Sentinel (Orlando, Florida)
- The Virginian-Pilot (Norfolk, Virginia)
  - Inside Business (Norfolk, Virginia)
  - AltDaily (Norfolk, Virginia)
- The Hartford Courant (Hartford, Connecticut)
  - ReminderNews
- The Morning Call (Allentown, Pennsylvania)
- Daily Press (Newport News, Virginia)
  - The Virginia Gazette (Williamsburg, Virginia)
  - The Tidewater Review

==== Commuter tabloids ====
- Tribune News Service

==== Magazines ====
- City & Shore Magazine
- Chicago Magazine
- Hartford Magazine
- Naperville Magazine
- Polo Equestrian of the Palm Beaches
- Prime Magazine
- South Florida Parenting
- Williamsburg Magazine

==== Websites ====
- The Daily Meal
- The Active Times
- Military News
- Metromix
- Pro Soccer USA

==== Syndication agency ====
- Tribune Content Agency

=== Former ===
- AM New York (New York, New York; 2003–2008)
- The Capital (Annapolis, Maryland)
  - Maryland Gazette
  - Bowie Blade (Bowie, Maryland)
  - Crofton-West County Gazette (Crofton, Maryland)
- Baltimore Sun (Baltimore, Maryland; 2000-2021)
  - Carroll County Times (Westminster, Maryland)
- Newsday (Melville, New York; 2000–2008)
  - 8 community weeklies
- Hoy (Los Angeles and San Diego (with an edition in north Baja California), California; 2000−2018)
- Los Angeles Times (Los Angeles, California; 2000–2018)
  - Daily Pilot (Newport Beach, California)
  - Burbank Leader (Burbank, California)
  - Glendale News Press (Glendale, California)
  - La Canada Valley Sun (La Canada Flintridge, California)
- RedEye (Chicago, Illinois)
- New York Daily News (New York City; 1919-1993, 2017-2021)
- San Diego Union-Tribune (San Diego, California; 2015–2018)
  - 8 community weeklies
