= El Sentinel =

El Sentinel is the name of two Spanish language newspapers in Florida, both owned by the Tribune Company of Chicago.

- El Sentinel del Sur de la Florida, a weekly based in Fort Lauderdale that serves the South Florida region
- El Sentinel (Orlando), a weekly based in Orlando, Florida that serves the Central Florida region
