= Todd Devoe =

American football player (born 1980)

No. 83, 14, 3
- Position: Wide receiver

Personal information
- Born: April 5, 1980 (age 46); Fort Lauderdale, Florida, U.S.
- Listed height: 6 ft 2 in (1.88 m)
- Listed weight: 205 lb (93 kg)

Career information
- High school: Boyd H. Anderson (Lauderdale Lakes, Florida)
- College: Itawamba, Central Missouri
- NFL draft: 2003: undrafted

Career history
- Baltimore Ravens (2003–2004)*; → Cologne Centurions (2004); Miami Dolphins (2004)*; Tennessee Titans (2004)*; Baltimore Ravens (2004)*; Denver Broncos (2005–2006); Toronto Argonauts (2007)*; Arizona Rattlers (2008, 2010); Chicago Rush (2011); Kansas City Command (2011); Kansas City Renegades (2013)*
- * Offseason or practice squad member only

Awards and highlights
- 2× First-team All-MIAA (2001–2002)

Career NFL statistics
- Receptions: 9
- Receiving yards: 87
- Receiving touchdowns: 1
- Stats at Pro Football Reference
- Stats at ArenaFan.com

Todd Vaughn Devoe (born April 5, 1980) is an American former professional football player who was a wide receiver in the National Football League (NFL) and Arena Football League (AFL). He was signed by the Baltimore Ravens as an undrafted free agent in 2003. He played college football at Itawamba Community College and Central Missouri.

Devoe was also a member of the Cologne Centurions, Miami Dolphins, Tennessee Titans, Denver Broncos, Toronto Argonauts, Arizona Rattlers, Chicago Rush, Kansas City Command and Kansas City Renegades.

== Early life ==
Devor attended Boyd H. Anderson High School in Lauderdale Lakes, Florida.

== College career ==
Devoe first played college football at Itawamba Community College from 1999 to 2000.

Devoe then transferred to play for the Central Missouri Mules from 2001 to 2002, earning first-team All-MIAA honors both years. He became the first player in school history to total 1,000 receiving yards in two different seasons. He caught 23 touchdowns during his time at Central Missouri. Devoe also set a school and MIAA record for longest touchdown catch with a 99-yarder. He participated in track and field at Central Missouri as well, garnering All-American recognition in 2002. He was inducted into Central Missouri's Athletic Hall of Fame in 2014.

== Professional career ==
Pre-draft measurables
Height	Weight
6 ft 1 5/8 in (1.87 m)	202 lb (92 kg)
Values from Pro Day

Devoe signed with the Baltimore Ravens on May 9, 2003, after going undrafted in the 2003 NFL draft. He was waived on August 30 and signed to the team's practice squad on September 2, 2003. He signed a reserve/future contract with the Ravens on January 15, 2004. Devoe was allocated to NFL Europe in 2004 and played for the Cologne Centurions during the 2004 NFL Europe season. He played in 10 games, starting eight, for the Centurions, catching 16 passes for 277 yards and five touchdowns. He also made five tackles. Devoe was waived by the Ravens on September 5, signed to the practice squad on September 7, and released on September 10, 2004.

Devoe was signed to the practice squad of the Miami Dolphins on September 14, 2004. He was released on September 28, 2004.

He was signed to the practice squad of the Tennessee Titans on October 7, 2004. He was released on November 30, 2004.

Devoe was signed to the practice squad of the Ravens on December 15, 2004.

He signed a reserve/future contract with the Denver Broncos on January 8, 2005. He played in 14 games for the Broncos in 2005, catching nine passes for 87 yards and one touchdown. He also recovered two fumbles and made eight solo tackles. Devoe appeared in one game during the 2006 season and was targeted once. He was waived on November 11, 2006.

Devoe was signed by the Toronto Argonauts of the Canadian Football League in February 2007. He was released on June 23, 2007.

Devoe later signed with the Arizona Rattlers of the Arena Football League (AFL) for the 2008 season. He was placed on injured reserve on February 11, 2008, and was activated on April 4, 2008. He caught 52 passes for 586 yards and 10 touchdowns for the Rattlers in 2008. Devoe also accumulated five solo tackes, three assisted tackles and one fumble recovery. The 2009 season was cancelled. Devoe was placed on injured reserve again on April 9, 2010, and was activated on May 17, 2010. He recorded 17 receptions for 162 yards and three touchdowns while also scoring one rushing touchdown in 2010. He totaled six solo tackles and eight assisted tackles as well. Devoe was placed on injured reserve for the third time on August 3, 2010.

Devoe was assigned to the Chicago Rush of the AFL on October 14, 2010. He was placed on physically unable to perform on February 28, 2011, and injured reserve on March 9. He was activated on April 14, 2011. He caught eight passes for 77 yards and one touchdown while also accumulating one solo tackle and one assisted tackle during the 2011 season.

Devoe was traded to the Kansas City Command on May 9, 2011, for future considerations. He was placed on refuse to report on May 10 and activated on May 11. He was placed on injured reserve on July 8, 2011. Overall, he totalled 25 receptions for 309 yards and four touchdowns for the Command in 2011. He also recorded five solo tackles and three assisted tackles.
