= Anthony Bell (American football) =

American football player (born 1964)

No. 55, 59, 94
- Position: Linebacker

Personal information
- Born: July 2, 1964 (age 62); Miami, Florida, U.S.
- Listed height: 6 ft 3 in (1.91 m)
- Listed weight: 235 lb (107 kg)

Career information
- High school: Boyd H. Anderson (Lauderdale Lakes, Florida)
- College: Michigan State
- NFL draft: 1986: 1st round, 5th overall pick

Career history
- St. Louis/Phoenix Cardinals (1986–1990); Detroit Lions (1991); Los Angeles Raiders (1992); Ottawa Rough Riders (1995)

Career NFL statistics
- Sacks: 11
- Fumble recoveries: 4
- Interceptions: 2
- Stats at Pro Football Reference

Anthony Dewitt Bell (born July 2, 1964) is an American former professional football player who was a linebacker for the St. Louis Cardinals of the National Football League (NFL). He played college football for the Michigan State Spartans and then was selected with the fifth overall pick in the first round of the 1986 NFL draft by the St. Louis Cardinals as the first linebacker selected in that year's draft under new Cardinals coach Gene Stallings.

While enrolled at Michigan State University in 1986, Bell was selected to receive the Chester Brewer Leadership Award which is presented to "a graduating senior for distinguished performance in athletics and scholarship, and for possessing a high degree of leadership qualities and skill."

After playing for the St. Louis/Phoenix Cardinals, Detroit Lions, and the Los Angeles Raiders, he was released in 1992 as a free agent. He played in the 1995 season for the Ottawa Rough Riders of the CFL, and retired soon thereafter.
