= Timothy P. Knight =

CEO of Tribune Publishing Company
- In office January 2019 – February 2020
- Preceded by: Justin Dearborn

Personal details
- Born: 1965 (age 60–61)
- Education: Marquette University (BS); DePaul University College of Law (JD)
- Occupation: Business Executive

Timothy P. Knight (born c. 1965) is an American attorney and media executive. He served as the chief executive officer of Tribune Publishing Company, a newspaper publishing company listed on the NYSE and NASDAQ.

== Early life ==
Knight was born circa 1965. He graduated from Marquette University, where he earned a Bachelor of Science in accounting, and he earned a Juris Doctor from the DePaul University College of Law.

== Career ==
Knight began his career for Skadden, Arps, Slate, Meagher & Flom. He worked in mergers and acquisitions for the Tribune Publishing Company in the 1990s, and he was the vice president its strategy and development division from 1998 to 2001. He joined Newsday in 2003 and became its president and COO in 2004. He was the CEO of Wrapports from 2011 to 2015, when he became the president of Northeast Ohio Media Group.

Knight returned to the Tribune Publishing Company in February 2017, and he succeeded Justin Dearborn as the company's CEO in January 2019. He stepped down as CEO in February 2020.

== Personal life ==
With his wife Stephanie, Knight has two sons, Fitz and Quinn.
