= Millennium Middle School =

Millennium Middle School may refer to:

- Millennium 6-12 Collegiate Academy, formerly Millennium Middle School, in Broward County Public Schools
- Millennium Middle School, Sanford, Florida, Seminole County Public Schools
