= David Dreier =

American businessman and politician (born 1952)

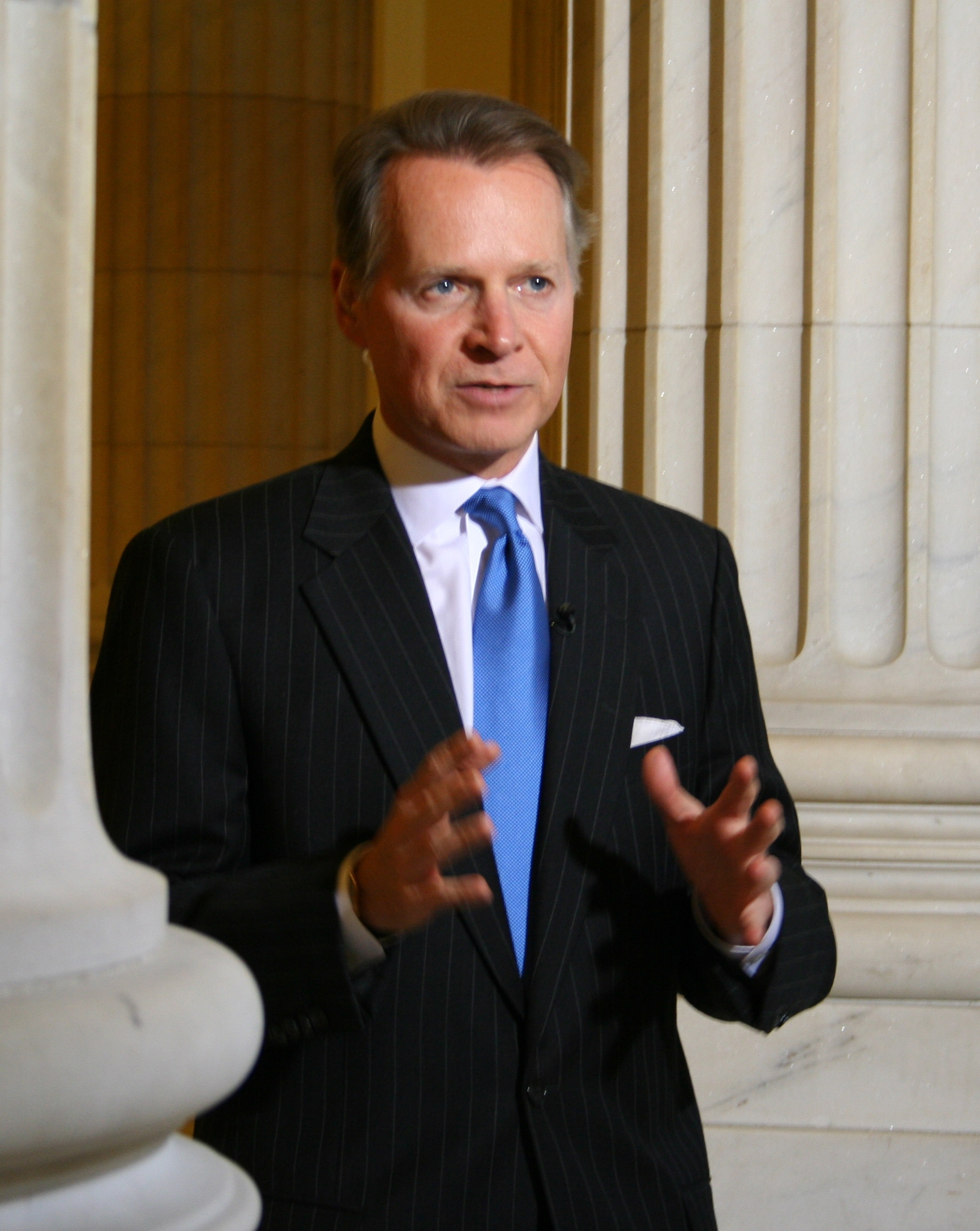

Chair of Tribune Publishing
- In office January 2019 – February 2020
- Preceded by: Justin Dearborn
- Succeeded by: Phillip Franklin

Chair of the House Rules Committee
- In office January 3, 2011 – January 3, 2013
- Preceded by: Louise Slaughter
- Succeeded by: Pete Sessions
- In office January 3, 1999 – January 3, 2007
- Preceded by: Gerald Solomon
- Succeeded by: Louise Slaughter

Member of the U.S. House of Representatives from California
- In office January 3, 1981 – January 3, 2013
- Preceded by: James F. Lloyd
- Succeeded by: Gary Miller (redistricted)
- Constituency: 35th district (1981–1983); 33rd district (1983–1993); 28th district (1993–2003); 26th district (2003–2013)

Personal details
- Born: David Timothy Dreier; July 5, 1952 (age 74) Kansas City, Missouri, U.S.
- Party: Republican
- Education: Claremont McKenna College (BA); Claremont Graduate University (MA)
- Awards: Order of the Aztec Eagle; Order of Saint Agatha (Knight Commander); Order of San Carlos
- Dreier's voice Dreier critiquing Russia's approach toward post-Soviet states. Recorded June 22, 2011

David Timothy Dreier OAE (/draɪər/ DRY-ər; born July 5, 1952) is an American businessman, philanthropist, jazz radio personality, and politician who served as a Republican member of the United States House of Representatives from California from 1981 to 2013. He was one of the youngest members ever elected to the United States Congress. Dreier was the youngest chairman of the House Rules Committee. He was closely involved in passing the North American Free Trade Agreement (NAFTA) in 1993. After leaving Congress, Dreier served on the Foreign Affairs Policy Board under President Barack Obama. He served as the chairman of the Tribune Publishing Company from 2019 to 2020. Dreier is also founder and chair of the Fallen Journalists Memorial Foundation.

== U.S. House of Representatives ==
=== Elections ===
==== Early career ====
In 1978, Dreier ran for the United States House of Representatives at the age of 25. He challenged incumbent Democrat James Fredrick Lloyd, who had first won in a Republican-leaning district in 1974. Though unknown and living in Phillips Hall at Claremont McKenna College, Dreier lost by 54% to 46%, less than expected for an undergraduate college student.

In 1980, Dreier ran again and defeated Lloyd 52% to 45%, winning on the coattails of former California Governor Ronald Reagan's presidential election. Dreier was sworn into office as one of the youngest-ever members of the House of Representatives.

After the 1980 United States census, his district was renumbered to the 33rd. Dreier defeated Congressman Wayne Grisham 57% to 43% in the Republican primary of 1982. Dreier became the first person to defeat two incumbent members of Congress in back to back elections. He won the 1982 general election with 65% of the vote. He won re-election every two years after that with at least 57% of the vote until his 2004 re-election. His district was renumbered to the 28th after the 1990 United States census and to the 26th district after the 2000 United States census.

==== 2004 election ====
In 2004, Dreier faced strong criticism for his position on illegal immigration from opponent Cynthia Matthews and several talk radio hosts who felt he was not tough enough on illegal immigrants.

Dreier won with 54% of the vote.

==== After 2004 ====
In 2006, he won reelection in a rematch against Matthews 57% to 38%, despite Republicans losing the majority that year.

In 2008, Dreier won reelection against Democrat Russ Warner with 53% of the vote.

In 2010, he defeated Warner in a rematch with 54% of the vote. Dreier ceased all campaign fundraising for more than a year, leading many to believe that he was planning to leave Congress.

After the 2010 United States census, the voter-created California Citizens Redistricting Commission renumbered Dreier's district as the 31st district, and reconfigured it as a Democratic-leaning, majority-Latino district. Dreier chose not to run for reelection in 2012 and encouraged his Republican colleague Gary Miller to move into the 31st after Miller's old district was merged with the district of another Republican, Ed Royce. Miller did so and won reelection in a surprise upset due largely to California’s unique top-two election system.

=== Tenure ===
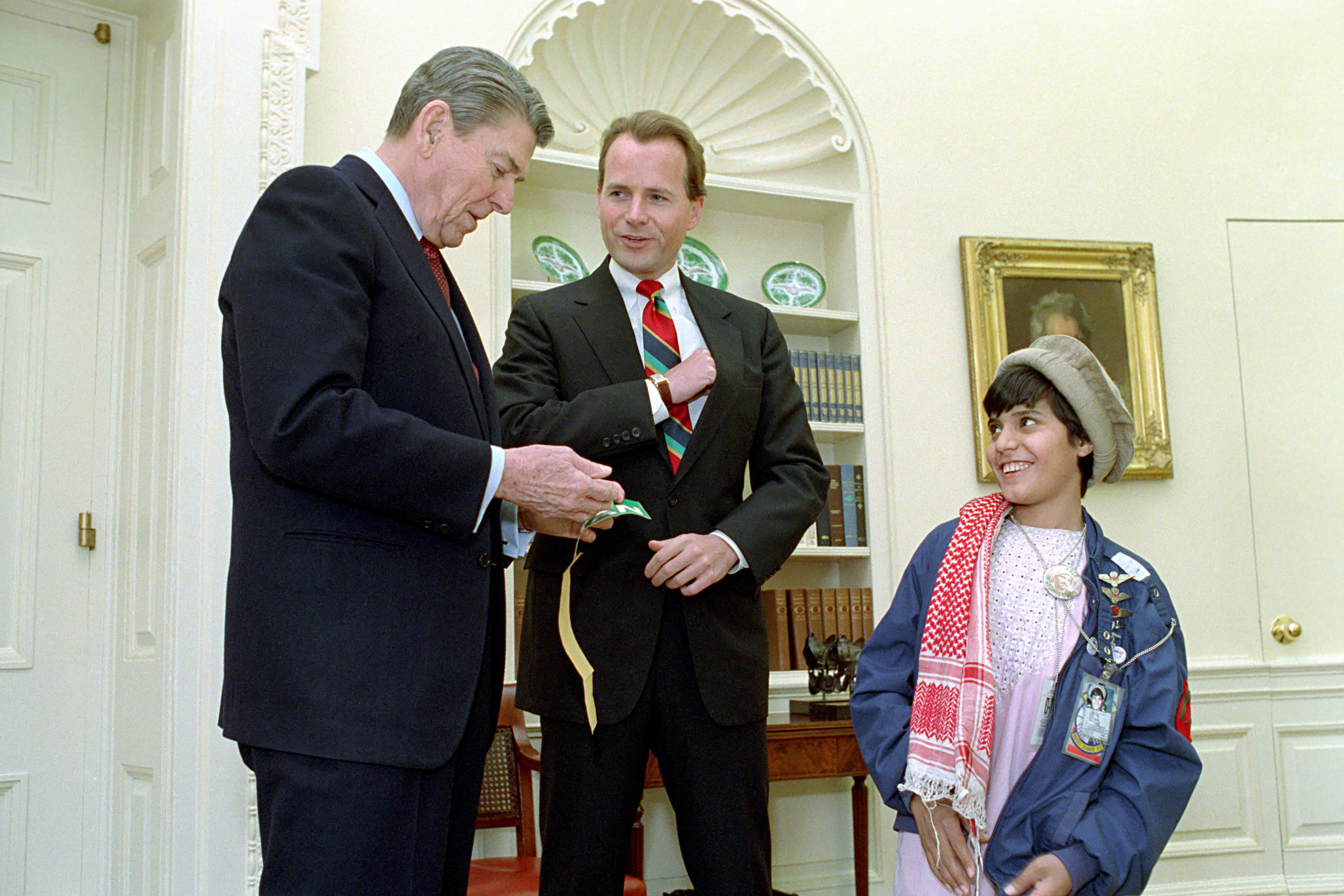
President Ronald Reagan meeting with Congressman David Dreier and Hazrat Khan, an Afghan boy whose family was killed during the Soviet invasion of Afghanistan

==== House leadership ====
Dreier was the youngest chairman of the House Rules Committee in U.S. history, as well as being the only Californian to hold that position. When the Democrats gained control of the House in the 2006 midterm elections, Dreier served as ranking member for the 110th and 111th Congresses. With the Republicans regaining control of the House in the 2010 midterm elections, Dreier again assumed the chairmanship during the 112th Congress.

Beginning with Dreier's chairmanship in 1999, the chairman of the Rules Committee became part of the nine-member elected Republican leadership.

Following the indictment of House Majority Leader Tom DeLay on September 28, 2005, House Speaker Dennis Hastert asked Dreier to assume temporarily the position of majority leader, as Dreier had consistently adhered to the views of the Republican leadership on many issues and would have been willing to relinquish the title should DeLay have returned to the position. However, rank-and-file Republican representatives disapproved of the choice of Dreier allegedly because many conservative members believed that he was "too politically moderate". According to Dreier spokeswoman Jo Maney, Dreier did not seek the temporary Majority Leader position because he "would have had to give up his chairmanship of the Rules Committee to move to another position, and that's not something that he wanted to do". The position instead went to then-Majority Whip Roy Blunt of Missouri, though both Dreier and then-Deputy Majority Whip Eric Cantor of Virginia shared in some duties.

==== Trade ====
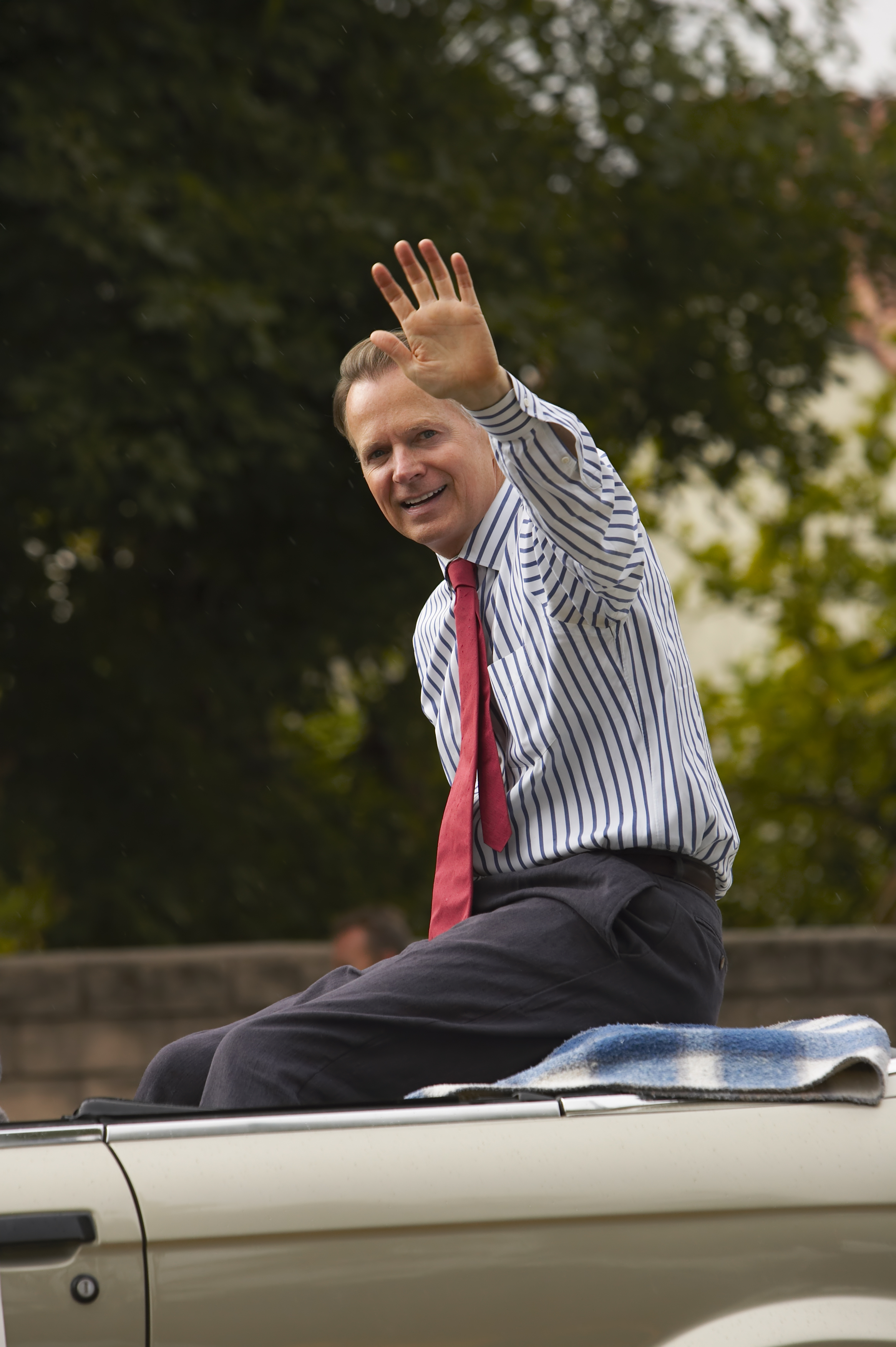
Dreier at the Walnut Family Festival Parade in Walnut, California on October 14, 2006

Along with House colleagues Jim Kolbe and Jerry Lewis, Dreier was the first member of Congress to propose a North American free trade agreement in 1987. He was instrumental in the creation and passage of what became NAFTA in 1993. During the signing ceremony for NAFTA, President Bill Clinton recognized Dreier's contribution to the ultimate success of the legislation.

Dreier opposed President Donald Trump's threats to abandon NAFTA, instead advocating for an updated NAFTA, which would include digital trade, among other subjects.

Dreier has been a longstanding supporter of closer ties between the United States and the countries of Latin America and has met frequently with executive and legislative branch leaders throughout the region. He has received the nation's highest honors from the presidents of Colombia, Mexico, and Nicaragua. On August 28, 2007, while building support for the United States–Colombia Free Trade Agreement, Dreier addressed the Colombian parliament. Dreier drew criticism from some opposition lawmakers when he sat on the edge of a podium during informal remarks to the legislators. Dreier later apologized and insisted he intended no disrespect. In comments released on August 30, 2007, Dreier said, "I meant absolutely no offense. I simply wanted to demonstrate my warm feeling and affection."

Dreier also founded the bipartisan House Trade Working Group, working closely with five American presidents of both parties on every free trade agreement into which the United States has entered. Dreier was a member of the Republican Main Street Partnership.

==== Foreign affairs ====
Dreier attended and led congressional delegations (CODELs) to dozens of nations during his tenure. He was the founder and first chairman of the House Democracy Partnership (HDP), which works to strengthen parliaments in new and re-emerging democracies on six continents.

==== Transportation ====
Dreier supported the expansion of public transportation in his district. He secured federal funding for the Metro Gold Line, connecting Downtown Los Angeles and Pasadena via light rail.

==== Gay rights ====
Dreier initially supported the bipartisan Defense of Marriage Act, signed into law by President Bill Clinton in 1996. Joining columnists such as William Raspberry in opposing "thought police," Dreier voted against the Matthew Shepard Act that expanded federal hate-crimes law to include crimes motivated by a victim's actual or perceived gender, sexual orientation, gender identity, or disability. Dreier initially supported the Don't ask, don't tell policy, which prevented LGBT members of the armed forces from serving openly. However, in December 2010, Dreier voted in favor of legislation that repealed the policy. Dreier opposed a constitutional amendment to ban same-sex marriage.

==== Other activities ====
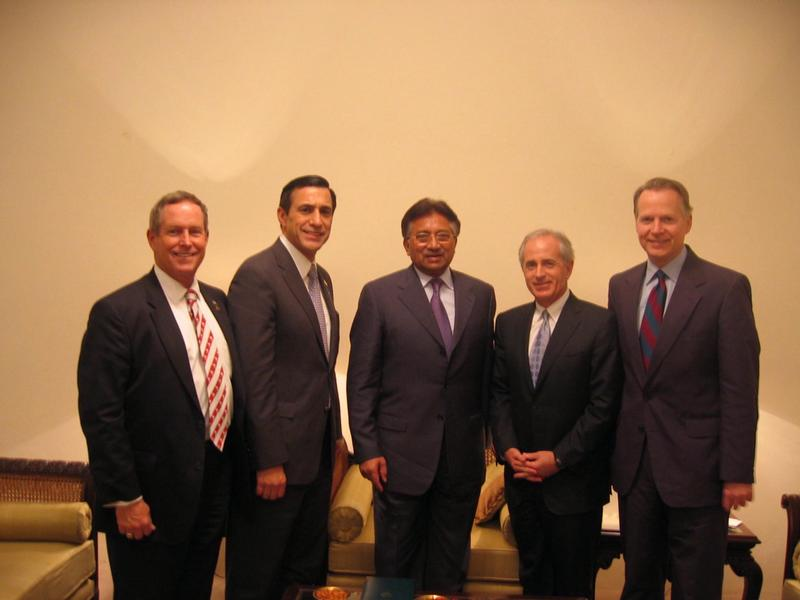
Members of a congressional delegation that met with Pakistani President Pervez Musharraf in Islamabad in 2007. From left to right: Rep. Joe Wilson (R-South Carolina), Rep. Darrell Issa (R-California), President Musharraf, Sen. Bob Corker (R-Tennessee), and Dreier.

He served as parliamentarian for four Republican National Conventions.

In 1998 at the Olympics training center in Lake Placid, NY, Dreier became the first member of Congress to complete a skeleton run.

=== Committee assignments ===
Chairman of the Committee on Rules (1999–2007, 2011–2013)

- Committee on Rules (1991–2013)
  - Subcommittee on Legislative and Budget Process
  - Subcommittee on Rules and the Organization of the House
- Committee on Banking, Finance and Urban Affairs (July 1981–1991)
- Committee on Government Operations (January 1981–July 1981)
- Committee on Small Business (1981–1991)

=== Caucus memberships ===
- International Conservation Caucus

== After Congress ==
On February 29, 2012, Dreier announced that upon completion of his term he would not seek re-election. Upon leaving Congress, Dreier joined the Obama Administration from 2013 to 2015, serving as a member of the Foreign Affairs Policy Board. He also served on the board of the Pacific Council on International Policy. Currently, he serves as a trustee of the Library of Congress' Congressional Office for International Leadership.

Dreier is founder of the Dreier Roundtable at Claremont McKenna College (his alma mater), where he serves as a trustee. In 2013, Dreier was elected to the board of trustees of Caltech. He serves on the Space Innovation Council at the Jet Propulsion Laboratory (JPL) and is a member of the Thirty Meter Telescope (TMT) working group.

Dreier also became chairman of the Annenberg-Dreier Commission at Sunnylands, which aims to promote the free flow of goods, services, capital, information, ideas, and people throughout the greater Pacific. He is also on the advisory board of the USC Annenberg School Center on Communication Leadership and Policy. Dreier is a distinguished fellow at the Brookings Institution, a member of the Council on Foreign Relations, and a leading member of the board of directors of the International Republican Institute. He also serves on the boards of the Los Angeles Mission Foundation and James Madison's Montpelier. Dreier was an executive producer of the 2020 documentary Ending Disease. He was also the co-executive producer of the 2018 U.S.-China relations documentary Better Angels.

=== Tribune Publishing ===
In January 2019, Dreier was named chairman of the board of Tribune Publishing Company, succeeding former Tribune Publishing CEO Justin Dearborn. Dreier had served on the Tribune Publishing board since 2016.

In February 2020, Dreier stepped down as chairman. He left the board in June 2020.

=== Fallen Journalists Memorial Foundation ===
On June 26, 2019, Dreier founded the Fallen Journalists Memorial Foundation (FJM Foundation), the main objective of which is to build a permanent memorial near the National Mall in Washington, D.C. to commemorate journalists who have been killed. One year earlier on June 28, 2018, the offices of Capital Gazette Communications, home to The Capital newspaper in Annapolis, Maryland, became the site of the deadliest attack against journalists in United States history when five were gunned down in their office. This mass shooting at The Capital, owned by Tribune Publishing Company, inspired Dreier to launch the FJM project. He serves as the chairman of the FJM Foundation.

=== KJazz Radio ===
Dreier began hosting a monthly “K.C. to KJazz” show on radio station KKJZ Los Angeles in November 2026.

== Awards ==
At the 5th Annual Directors Guild of America Honors Gala in 2004, Dreier and Representative Howard Berman received a DGA Honor for their efforts in fighting runaway film and television production. The award was presented by Rob Reiner, Sidney Pollack, and Warren Beatty. Also in 2004, the American Political Science Association (APSA) gave Dreier the Hubert Humphrey Award.

In 2013, Dreier was inducted into the Order of Saint Agatha as a Knight Commander by the Republic of San Marino, the world's oldest republic.

In 2017, President Enrique Peña Nieto of Mexico inducted Dreier into the Order of the Aztec Eagle. Dreier has also been awarded the Order of San Carlos by the president of Colombia and the Order of Rubén Darío by the president of Nicaragua.

Dreier is a member of the Alfalfa Club.

He has been awarded the Clean Air Award by the Sierra Club.

== Personal life ==
Dreier lost his Malibu home in the Woolsey Fire in late 2018.

Drier is a descendant of Richard Bland Lee, a congressman from Virginia who served on the first House Rules Committee.

In his earlier years in Congress, Dreier appeared on "most eligible bachelor" lists for Washington DC. At one point in the 1990s he dated Bo Derek.

== Electoral history ==
David Dreier electoral history

1978 United States House of Representatives elections in California
Party	Candidate	Votes	%
Democratic	James F. Lloyd (incumbent)	80,388	54.0
Republican	David Dreier	68,442	46.0
Total votes		148,830	100.0
Democratic hold			

1980 United States House of Representatives elections in California
Party	Candidate	Votes	%
Republican	David Dreier	100,743	51.8
Democratic	James F. Lloyd (incumbent)	88,279	45.4
Peace and Freedom	James Michael "Mike" Noonan	5,492	2.8
Total votes		194,514	100.0
Republican gain from Democratic			

1982 United States House of Representatives elections in California
Party	Candidate	Votes	%
Republican	David Dreier (Incumbent)	112,362	65.2
Democratic	Paul Servelle	55,514	32.2
Libertarian	Phillips B. Franklin	2,251	1.3
Peace and Freedom	James Michael "Mike" Noonan	2,223	1.3
Total votes		172,350	100.0
Republican hold			

1984 United States House of Representatives elections in California
Party	Candidate	Votes	%
Republican	David Dreier (Incumbent)	147,363	70.6
Democratic	Claire K. McDonald	54,147	26.0
Libertarian	Gail Lightfoot	4,738	2.3
Peace and Freedom	James Michael "Mike" Noonan	2,371	1.1
Total votes		208,619	100.0
Republican hold			

1986 United States House of Representatives elections in California
Party	Candidate	Votes	%
Republican	David Dreier (Incumbent)	118,541	71.7
Democratic	Monty Hempel	44,312	26.8
Peace and Freedom	James Michael "Mike" Noonan	2,500	1.5
Total votes		165,353	100.0
Republican hold			

1988 United States House of Representatives elections in California
Party	Candidate	Votes	%
Republican	David Dreier (Incumbent)	151,704	69.2
Democratic	Nelson Gentry	57,586	26.2
Libertarian	Gail Lightfoot	6,601	3.0
Peace and Freedom	James Michael "Mike" Noonan	3,492	1.6
Total votes		219,383	100.0
Republican hold			

1990 United States House of Representatives elections in California
Party	Candidate	Votes	%
Republican	David Dreier (Incumbent)	101,336	63.7
Democratic	Georgia Houston Webb	49,981	31.4
Libertarian	Gail Lightfoot	7,840	4.9
Total votes		159,157	100.0
Republican hold			

1992 United States House of Representatives elections in California
Party	Candidate	Votes	%
Republican	David Dreier (Incumbent)	122,353	58.4
Democratic	Al Wachtel	76,525	36.6
Green	Walt Contreras Sheasby	6,233	3.0
Libertarian	Thomas J. Dominy	4,271	2.0
Total votes		209,382	100.0
Republican hold			

1994 United States House of Representatives elections in California
Party	Candidate	Votes	%
Republican	David Dreier (Incumbent)	110,179	67.1
Democratic	Tommy Randle	50,022	30.4
Libertarian	Jorj Clayton Baker	4,069	2.5
Independent	Hatch (write-in)	7	0.0
Total votes		164,277	100.0
Republican hold			

1996 United States House of Representatives elections in California
Party	Candidate	Votes	%
Republican	David Dreier (Incumbent)	113,389	60.7
Democratic	David Levering	69,037	37.0
Libertarian	Ken Saurenman	4,459	2.3
Total votes		186,885	100.0
Republican hold			

1998 United States House of Representatives elections in California
Party	Candidate	Votes	%
Republican	David Dreier (Incumbent)	90,607	57.7
Democratic	Janice M. Nelson	61,721	39.3
Libertarian	Jerry R. Douglas	2,099	1.3
Green	Walt Contreras Sheasby	1,954	1.2
Natural Law	M. Lawrence Allison	819	0.5
Total votes		157,200	100.0
Republican hold			

2000 United States House of Representatives elections in California
Party	Candidate	Votes	%
Republican	David Dreier (Incumbent)	116,557	56.9
Democratic	Janice M. Nelson	81,804	39.9
Libertarian	Randall G. Weissbuch	2,823	1.3
Natural Law	Lawrence Allison	2,083	1.0
American Independent	Joe "Jay" Haytas	1,932	0.9
Total votes		205,199	100.0
Republican hold			

2002 election
Party	Candidate	Votes	%
Republican	David Dreier (incumbent)	95,360	63.8
Democratic	Marjorie Musser Mikels	50,081	33.5
Libertarian	Randall Weissbuch	4,089	2.7
Total votes		149,530	100.0
Turnout			
Republican hold			

2004 election
Party	Candidate	Votes	%
Republican	David Dreier (incumbent)	134,596	51.6
Democratic	Cynthia Matthews	107,522	46.8
Libertarian	Randall Weissbuch	9,089	1.6
Total votes		251,207	100.0
Turnout			
Republican hold			

2006 election
Party	Candidate	Votes	%
Republican	David Dreier (incumbent)	102,028	48.29%
Democratic	Cynthia Matthews	99,878	47.27%
Libertarian	Ted Brown	5,887	2.79%
American Independent	Elliott Graham	3,503	1.65%
Total votes		211,296	100.0
Turnout			
Republican hold			

2008 election
Party	Candidate	Votes	%
Republican	David Dreier (incumbent)	140,615	52.7
Democratic	Russ Warner	108,039	40.4
Libertarian	Ted Brown	18,476	6.9
Total votes		267,130	100.0
Turnout			
Republican hold			

2010 election
Party	Candidate	Votes	%
Republican	David Dreier (incumbent)	112,774	54.13
Democratic	Russ Warner	76,093	36.52
American Independent	David L. Miller	12,784	6.14
Libertarian	Randall Weissbuch	6,696	3.21
Total votes		208,347	100.00
Turnout			
Republican hold			

== See also ==
- United States House Committee on Rules
- People from Malibu, California
- People from Beverly Hills, California
- People from the Claremont Colleges
- People from Claremont Graduate University

U.S. House of Representatives
Preceded by James Lloyd	Member of the U.S. House of Representatives from California's 35th congressional district 1981–1983	Succeeded by Jerry Lewis
Preceded by Wayne Grisham	Member of the U.S. House of Representatives from California's 33rd congressional district 1983–1993	Succeeded by Lucille Roybal-Allard
Preceded by Julian Dixon	Member of the U.S. House of Representatives from California's 28th congressional district 1993–2003	Succeeded by Howard Berman
Preceded by Gerald Solomon	Chair of the House Rules Committee; 1999–2007	Succeeded by Louise Slaughter
Preceded by Howard Berman	Member of the U.S. House of Representatives from California's 26th congressional district 2003–2013	Succeeded by Julia Brownley
New office	Chair of the House Democracy Partnership; 2005–2007	Succeeded by David Price
Preceded by Louise Slaughter	Ranking Member of the House Rules Committee; 2007–2011	Succeeded by Louise Slaughter
Preceded by David Price	Ranking Member of the House Democracy Partnership; 2007–2011	Succeeded by David Price
Preceded by Louise Slaughter	Chair of the House Rules Committee; 2011–2013	Succeeded by Pete Sessions
Preceded by David Price	Chair of the House Democracy Partnership; 2011–2013	Succeeded by David Price
U.S. order of precedence (ceremonial)
Preceded by Lamar Smith as Former U.S. Representative	Order of precedence of the United States as Former U.S. Representative	Succeeded by Anna Eshoo as Former U.S. Representative
