= Tim Golden =

Tim Golden may refer to:

- Tim Golden (politician), Republican member of the Georgia State Senate
- Tim Golden (journalist), investigative journalist
- Tim Golden (American football) (born 1959), former American football player
