= North Lauderdale, Florida =

- City
- Flag Logo
- Motto: "A Fun City In The Heart Of Broward" "Building a Future" "City of Tomorrow"
- Location of North Lauderdale in Broward County in State of Florida
- Coordinates: 26°12′41″N 80°13′16″W
- Country: United States
- State: Florida
- County: Broward
- Incorporated: July 10, 1963

Government
  - Type: Commission-Manager

Area
  - City: 4.70 sq mi (12.16 km^{2})
  - Land: 4.62 sq mi (11.97 km^{2})
  - Water: 0.073 sq mi (0.19 km^{2}) 0.72%
- Elevation: 10 ft (3.0 m)

Population (2020)
  - City: 44,794
  - Density: 9,691.9/sq mi (3,742.06/km^{2})
  - Metro: 6,166,488
- Time zone: UTC-5 (EST)
  - Summer (DST): UTC-4 (EDT)
- ZIP codes: 33068, 33319
- Area codes: 754, 954
- FIPS code: 12-49425
- GNIS feature ID: 2404392
- Website: www.nlauderdale.org

North Lauderdale is a city in Broward County, Florida, United States. It is a principal city of the Miami metropolitan area. As of the 2020 census, the city's population was 44,794.

== History ==
At its creation in 1963, it was largely farmland on the western edge of development in Broward County. North Lauderdale was originally grazing pasture for cows and horses of the Anderson Dairy Farm and also an agricultural area for the Lena Lyons Stringbean Farm. Recognizing a rare opportunity to work with a blank slate, famed architect Morris Lapidus turned his attention to planning a city that would become North Lauderdale. Lapidus gained international notoriety for launching the 1950s “Miami Beach” style resort hotel. His design of the Fontainebleau Resort, the Eden Roc and Americana helped create the style of Miami Beach. After hotels, Lapidus turned to designing cities. North Lauderdale, “The City of Tomorrow”, was the first city he laid out. Residents still benefit from his influence and vision, which can be seen in the whimsical “beacons” lending the city prominence and in the distinct, amoebic shape of Boulevard of Champions. In the late 1960s, recognizing the growing demand for single-family homes, the Osias Organization, headed by Colonel Nathan Rood, who was also the first appointed Mayor, purchased most of the land and began the development of North Lauderdale proper. In April 1969, by straw vote, Michael Saraniero became the city's first elected Mayor.

Once the city was laid out, the promise of affordable homes near the seaside ushered in a 10-year development boom in the 1970s. Where the rich and famous flocked to Miami Beach, regular families enamored with the Sun Belt, moved to North Lauderdale. Thousands moved in and neighborhood after neighborhood came to life.

== Geography ==
The City of North Lauderdale is located in north-central Broward County. It is adjacent to the following municipalities:

On its north:

- Margate

On its northwest:

- Coral Springs

On its west and south:

- Tamarac

On its east:

- Fort Lauderdale

On its northeast:

- Pompano Beach

According to the United States Census Bureau, the city has a total area of 4.6 square miles (12.0 km^{2}), of which 4.6 square miles (11.9 km^{2}) is land and 0.039 square miles (0.1 km^{2}) (0.72%) is water.

=== Climate ===
North Lauderdale has a tropical climate, similar to the climate found in much of the Caribbean. It is part of the only region in the 48 contiguous states that falls under that category. More specifically, it generally has a tropical rainforest climate (Köppen climate classification: Af), bordering a tropical monsoon climate (Köppen climate classification: Am).

== Demographics ==
Historical population
Census	Pop.	Note	%±
1970	1,213		—
1980	18,653		1,437.8%
1990	26,506		42.1%
2000	32,264		21.7%
2010	41,023		27.1%
2020	44,794		9.2%
U.S. Decennial Census

=== Racial and ethnic composition ===
North Lauderdale city, Florida – Racial and ethnic composition Note: the US Census treats Hispanic/Latino as an ethnic category. This table excludes Latinos from the racial categories and assigns them to a separate category. Hispanics/Latinos may be of any race.
Race / Ethnicity (NH = Non-Hispanic)	Pop 2000	Pop 2010	Pop 2020	% 2000	% 2010	% 2020
White alone (NH)	11,831	6,603	4,231	36.67%	16.10%	9.45%
Black or African American alone (NH)	11,050	21,334	25,620	34.25%	52.00%	57.20%
Native American or Alaska Native alone (NH)	59	72	83	0.18%	0.18%	0.19%
Asian alone (NH)	998	1,184	1,303	3.09%	2.89%	2.91%
Native Hawaiian or Pacific Islander alone (NH)	16	25	10	0.05%	0.06%	0.02%
Other race alone (NH)	250	287	486	0.77%	0.70%	1.08%
Mixed race or Multiracial (NH)	1,244	940	1,362	3.86%	2.29%	3.04%
Hispanic or Latino (any race)	6,816	10,578	11,699	21.13%	25.79%	26.12%
Total	32,264	41,023	44,794	100.00%	100.00%	100.00%

=== 2020 census ===
As of the 2020 census, North Lauderdale had a population of 44,794. The median age was 33.8 years. 27.1% of residents were under the age of 18 and 9.8% of residents were 65 years of age or older. For every 100 females there were 89.1 males, and for every 100 females age 18 and over there were 83.7 males age 18 and over.

100.0% of residents lived in urban areas, while 0.0% lived in rural areas.

There were 14,306 households in North Lauderdale, of which 43.8% had children under the age of 18 living in them. Of all households, 39.2% were married-couple households, 16.9% were households with a male householder and no spouse or partner present, and 36.5% were households with a female householder and no spouse or partner present. About 19.2% of all households were made up of individuals and 5.7% had someone living alone who was 65 years of age or older.

There were 14,920 housing units, of which 4.1% were vacant. The homeowner vacancy rate was 1.0% and the rental vacancy rate was 4.6%.

Racial composition as of the 2020 census
Race	Number	Percent
White	6,366	14.2%
Black or African American	26,175	58.4%
American Indian and Alaska Native	230	0.5%
Asian	1,311	2.9%
Native Hawaiian and Other Pacific Islander	11	0.0%
Some other race	4,882	10.9%
Two or more races	5,819	13.0%
Hispanic or Latino (of any race)	11,699	26.1%

=== 2010 census ===
As of the 2010 United States census, there were 41,023 people, 12,586 households, and 9,354 families residing in the city.

=== 2000 census ===
In 2000, the city the population was spread out, with 29.9% under the age of 18, 10.7% from 18 to 24, 35.2% from 25 to 44, 17.4% from 45 to 64, and 6.9% who were 65 years of age or older. The median age was 30 years. For every 100 females, there were 94.0 males. For every 100 females age 18 and over, there were 89.0 males.

In 2000, 42.4% had children under the age of 18 living with them, 46.8% were married couples living together, 19.3% had a female householder with no husband present, and 27.6% were non-families. 19.6% of all households were made up of individuals, and 5.5% had someone living alone who was 65 years of age or older. The average household size was 2.99 and the average family size was 3.43.

As of 2000, the median income for a household in the city was $40,050, and the median income for a family was $41,990. Males had a median income of $29,188 versus $24,828 for females. The per capita income for the city was $15,557. About 11.5% of families and 13.7% of the population were below the poverty line, including 16.9% of those under age 18 and 11.0% of those age 65 or over.

As of 2000, the percentage of Colombians was 3.63% of the population. It was also the 9th highest percentage Jamaican-populated area with 11.47%, while it had the 31st highest percentage of Haitians in at 6.7%, and the 38th highest percentage Trinidadians and Tobagonians community in the US, with 1.7% of the residents (tied with a few other US areas.)

As of 2000, speakers of English as their first language accounted for 67.63% of the population, while Spanish was spoken by 20.31%, French Creole 6.16%, French 1.48%, Portuguese 1.42%, and Vietnamese speakers made up 0.89% of residents.

== Media ==
North Lauderdale is a part of the Miami-Fort Lauderdale-Hollywood media market, which is the twelfth largest radio market and the seventeenth largest television market in the United States. Its primary daily newspapers are the South Florida Sun-Sentinel, The Miami Herald, and the alternative weekly New Times Broward-Palm Beach. There is also their Spanish-language counterparts El Sentinel and El Nuevo Herald.

== Activities ==
Every year, during Halloween, Hampton Pines Park host the Haunted Hamptons along with the Christmas event at City Hall.

North Lauderdale Days is an annual celebration in which the city opens the pool to the public, invites vendors, and provides live music. North Lauderdale Days is a longtime annual tradition that culminates with a fireworks display.

== Education ==
Broward County Public Schools operates public schools. District schools in the city limits include:

- North Lauderdale PK-8 – Zoned for elementary only, serves the center-north of the city
- Silver Lakes Middle School – Serves much of the city
- Broadview Elementary School – Serves the south/southeast of the city
- Morrow Elementary School – Serves the north of the city
- Pinewood Elementary School – Serves the south and west of the city

Some sections are served by Cypress, Liberty, and Park Lakes elementary schools. Some sections are served by Lauderdale Lakes, Margate, and Millennium 6-12 Collegiate Academy middle schools.

Much of North Lauderdale is zoned to Coconut Creek High School. Other sections are zoned to Boyd Anderson, Northeast, and Piper high schools.

There is also a charter school, Somerset Preparatory Academy Charter High At North Lauderdale.

== Notable people ==
- Christian Thompson, former NFL one-time champion player
