= Boyd H. Anderson High School =

Public high school in Lauderdale Lakes, Florida

Location
- 3050 NW 41st Street; Lauderdale Lakes, Florida 33309; United States; 26°10′40.30″N 80°11′4.17″W

Information
- Other names: Boyd Anderson or B.A.
- Type: Public
- Established: 1971
- School district: Broward County Public Schools
- Superintendent: Dr. Peter B. Licata
- CEEB code: 100479
- Principal: James Griffin
- Teaching staff: 84.53 (FTE)
- Grades: 9–12
- Enrollment: 2,162 (2023–2024)
- Student to teacher ratio: 25.58
- Colors: Orange and black
- Team name: Cobras
- Website: www.browardschools.com/boydanderson

Boyd H. Anderson High School (also called "Boyd Anderson" or "B.A.") is a suburban public high school located in Lauderdale Lakes, Florida. It is a part of Broward County Public Schools.

Boyd H. Anderson serves all of Lauderdale Lakes, and parts of Tamarac, North Lauderdale, Oakland Park, Fort Lauderdale, and Lauderhill.

The school is named after the third county judge of Broward County, Boyd H. Anderson Sr., who served from 1933 to 1968.

The school mascot is the cobra, and the school colors are orange and black.

On May 16, 1985, Superintendent William J. Leary placed a Notice to School Employees poster (EPA Form 7730-3) at Boyd Anderson, indicating the school contains friable asbestos.

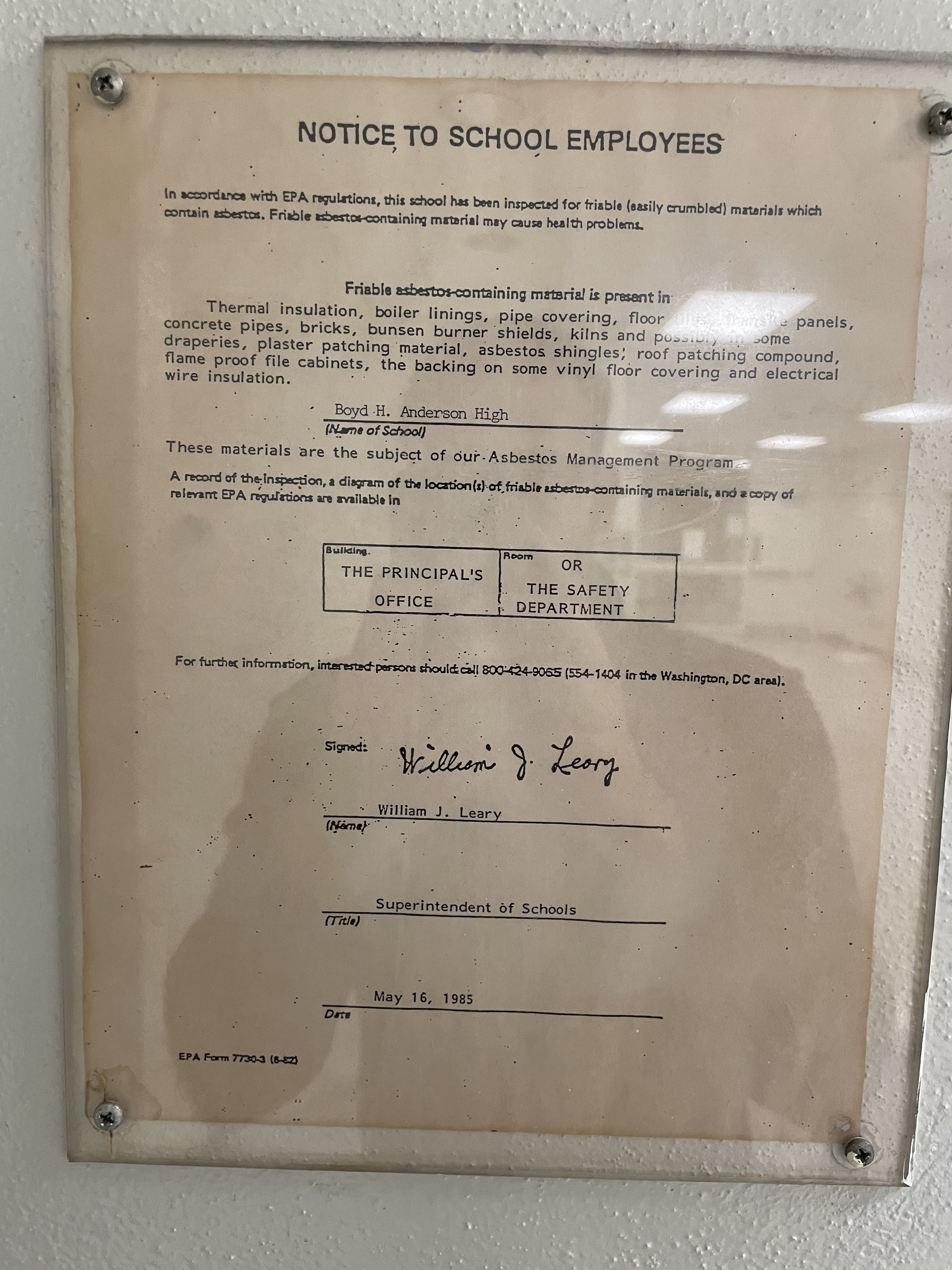
This notice was signed by superintendent William J. Leary on May 16, 1985.

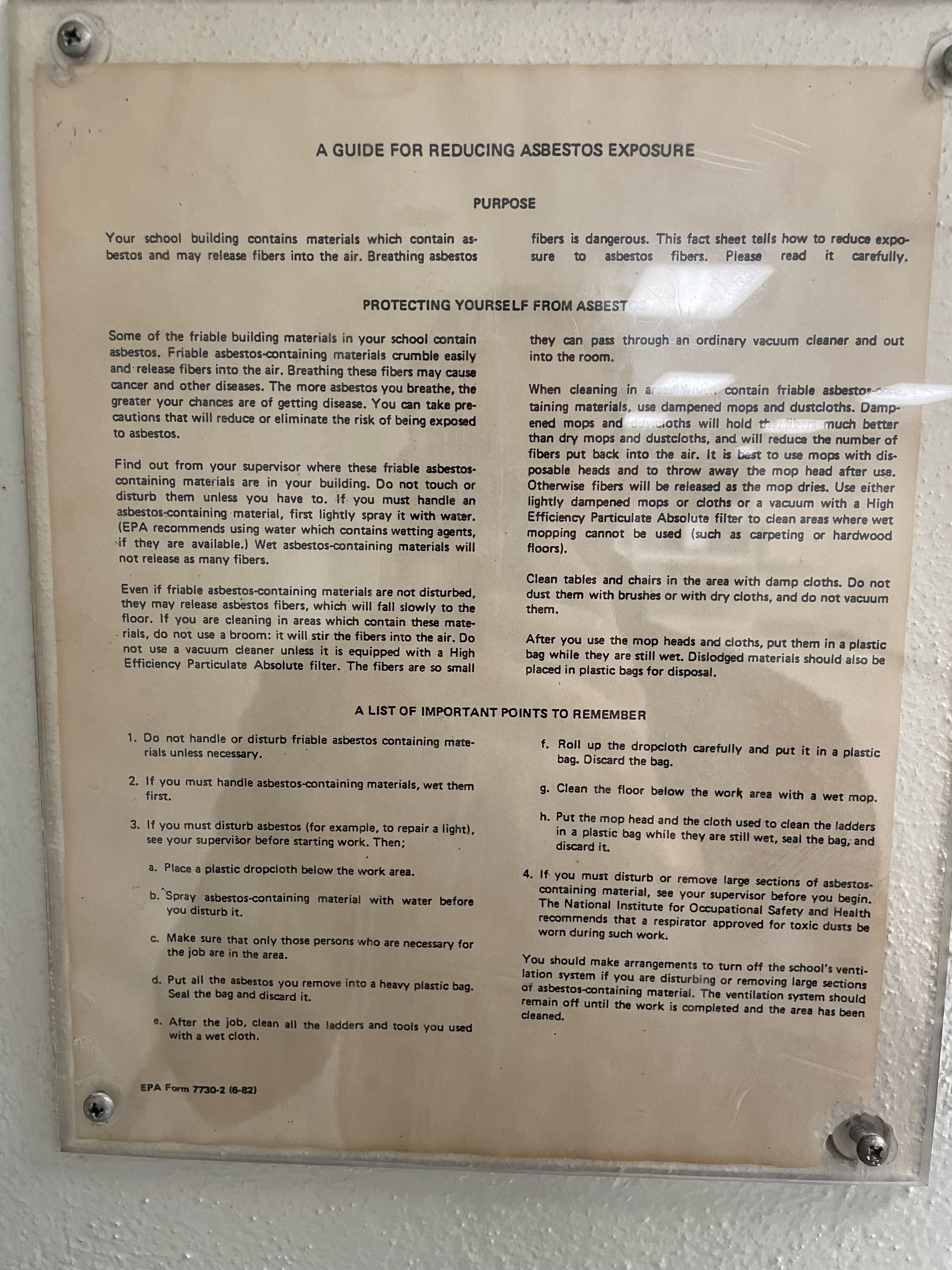
EPA Form 7730-2

== Academics ==
Boyd Anderson had a Florida Comprehensive Assessment Test school grade of "C" for the 2011–12 academic year.

Boyd Anderson High School is the first public school in Broward County to contain an accredited International Baccalaureate diploma program as a magnet program. It gained this distinction in December 1985. In September 2005, it began offering the "Middle Years" program.

The school has a Health and Wellness magnet program. It also offers dual enrollment courses such as ENC101 Composition, Transportation, and Safety.

== Athletics ==
The school's teams reached three state championships in track and field (1995, 1997, 2000), and three state championships in cross country (1992, 1996, 1998). They ranked #2 nationally in track and field (1998), and 18th in cross country. They won the 5A Basketball State Championship in 1994.

== Debate ==
The school has also had success in forensics and speech & debate. In 2010, a debate team started at Boyd Anderson that competed in the Florida Forensic League. In the second year of the debate team, two Boyd Anderson students advanced from the South Florida region to the National Forensic League National Championship Tournament.

== Service organizations ==
Boyd Anderson maintains several community service-based organizations, including Key Club, Students Helping Achieve Philanthropic Excellence, Ladies of Distinction, Brother to Brother, Sister to Sister, and Gentlemen of Distinction.

== Demographics ==
As of the 2021–22 school year, the total student enrollment was 1,879. The ethnic makeup of the school was 90.6% Black, 9.8% White, 9.4% Hispanic, 1.3% multiracial, 0.7% Asian, 0.4% Native American or Native Alaskan, and 0.2% Pacific Islander.

== Notable alumni ==
- Ivan Aska (2008), basketball player
- Anthony Bell, American football linebacker
- Don Blackmon, American football linebacker
- Josh Bynes (2007), American football linebacker
- Todd Devoe, American football wide receiver
- James Fishback, investor and political candidate
- Tim Golden, American football linebacker
- Abdul Hodge (2001), American football linebacker
- Eddie Jackson (2013), American football safety
- Bruce "JoJo" Natson (2012), American football wide receiver and return specialist
- Ryan Reid (2005), basketball player
- Mitch Richmond, Hall of Fame professional basketball player
- Scott W. Rothstein, disbarred lawyer and convicted felon
- Asante Samuel (1999), American football cornerback
- Benny Sapp (2000), American football cornerback
- Richard Smith, American football wide receiver
