= Eddie Jackson (safety) =

American football player (born 1993)

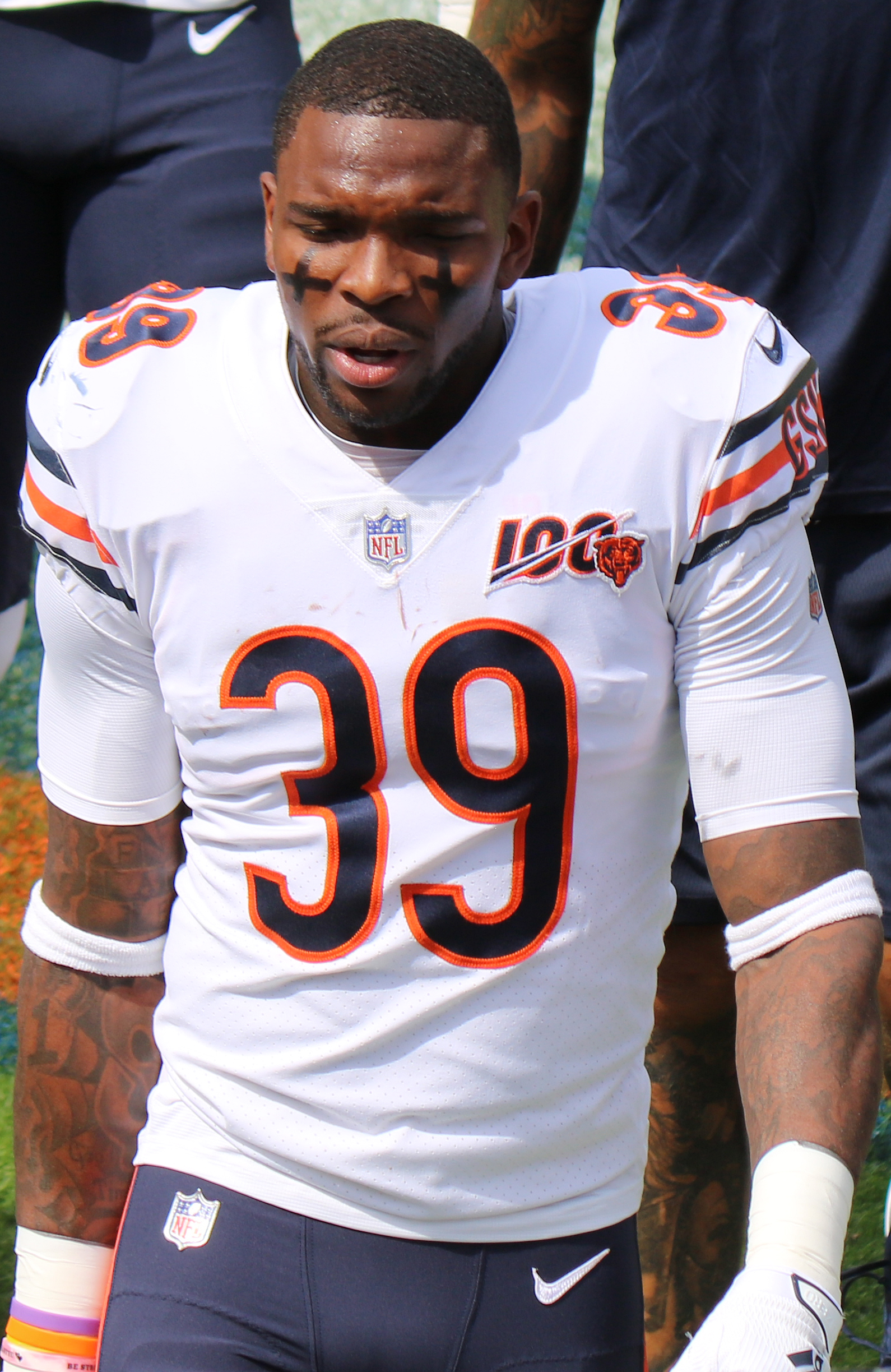
- Jackson with the Chicago Bears in 2019

Profile
- Position: Safety

Personal information
- Born: December 10, 1993 (age 32); Lauderdale Lakes, Florida, U.S.
- Listed height: 6 ft 0 in (1.83 m)
- Listed weight: 206 lb (93 kg)

Career information
- High school: Boyd H. Anderson (Lauderdale Lakes)
- College: Alabama (2013–2016)
- NFL draft: 2017: 4th round, 112th overall pick

Career history
- Chicago Bears (2017–2023); Baltimore Ravens (2024); Los Angeles Chargers (2024)*
- * Offseason or practice squad member only

Awards and highlights
- First-team All-Pro (2018); 2× Pro Bowl (2018, 2019); 100 Greatest Bears of All-Time; CFP national champion (2015); CFP National Championship Game Defensive MVP (2016); Third-team All-American (2015); First-team All-SEC (2015); Second-team All-SEC (2016)

Career NFL statistics as of 2024
- Total tackles: 489
- Sacks: 2.0
- Forced fumbles: 10
- Fumble recoveries: 6
- Pass deflections: 45
- Interceptions: 15
- Defensive touchdowns: 6
- Stats at Pro Football Reference

Eddie Jackson (born December 10, 1993) is an American professional football safety. He was selected by the Chicago Bears in the fourth round of the 2017 NFL draft. He played college football for the Alabama Crimson Tide.

== Early life ==
Jackson attended Boyd H. Anderson High School in Lauderdale Lakes, Florida. He played defensive back and wide receiver for the football team. As a senior, he had 37 receptions for 792 yards on offense and 66 tackles and five interceptions on defense. Jackson committed to the University of Alabama to play college football under head coach Nick Saban.

== College career ==
Jackson started his career at Alabama as a cornerback. As a true freshman in 2013, he played in seven games with four starts and had 19 tackles and one interception. Jackson tore his ACL prior to this sophomore season in April 2014 but returned that year to play in 11 games with 10 starts. He recorded 41 tackles, one sack and one interception. Prior to his junior year in 2015, Jackson switched from cornerback to safety. He played in all 15 games, recording 46 tackles and six interceptions. He was named the Defensive MVP of the 2016 College Football Playoff National Championship after recording three tackles and an interception against Clemson in a 45–40 victory. Jackson broke his left leg against Texas A&M in the eighth week of the 2016 season, ending his year. He finished his injury-shortened senior season with two punt returns and one interception returned for touchdowns, and was named second-team all-conference despite only playing eight games.

== Professional career ==
=== Pre-draft ===
Coming out of Alabama, Jackson was projected by the majority of NFL draft experts and scouts to be a third round pick. He received an invitation to the NFL Combine, but was unable to perform any physical drills during the entire pre-draft process due to the broken leg he suffered in October. He was ranked the fifth best strong safety prospect in the draft by NFLDraftScout.com.

Pre-draft measurables
Height	Weight	Arm length	Hand span	Wingspan	Bench press
6 ft 0 3/8 in (1.84 m)	201 lb (91 kg)	32 1/4 in (0.82 m)	9 1/4 in (0.23 m)	6 ft 6 in (1.98 m)	10 reps
All values from NFL Combine

=== Chicago Bears ===
External videos
- Bears draft Eddie Jackson 112th overall
- 2017 NFL Draft: Eddie Jackson

The Chicago Bears selected Jackson in the fourth round (112th overall) of the 2017 NFL draft. The Chicago Bears were fearful that Jackson would not remain available at 117th overall, so in order to secure his acquisition they traded a fourth (117th overall) and sixth round pick (197th overall) in the 2017 NFL Draft to the Los Angeles Rams and received their fourth round pick (112th overall) in return. He was the 13th safety drafted.

==== 2017 ====
On May 15, 2017, the Chicago Bears signed Jackson to a four-year, $3.06 million contract that includes a signing bonus of $665,797.

Throughout training camp, Jackson competed against Adrian Amos and Chris Prosinski to be the starting free safety. Head coach John Fox named Jackson the starting free safety to begin the season.

He made his first career start and professional regular season debut in the Bears' season-opener against the Atlanta Falcons and recorded three solo tackles during the 23–17 loss. On October 22, 2017, Jackson recorded four solo tackles, deflected a pass, made his first career interception, recovered a fumble, and scored two touchdowns during the Bears' 17–3 victory over the Carolina Panthers. He recovered a fumble by quarterback Cam Newton, on the Panthers' first drive, and returned it for a 75-yard touchdown in the first quarter to mark the first score of his career. During the second quarter, Jackson intercepted a pass attempt thrown by Newton, that was intended for wide receiver Kelvin Benjamin, and returned it for a 76-yard touchdown. He earned the NFC Defensive Player of the Week and became the first player in NFL history with multiple 75-plus-yard defensive touchdowns in the same game. On December 10, 2017, Jackson celebrated his 24th birthday and recorded an interception, forced a fumble after stripping the ball from A. J. Green, and recovered it during the Bears' 33–7 victory over the Cincinnati Bengals. In Week 17, he collected a season-high 11 combined tackles (five solo) in the Bears' 23–10 loss at the Minnesota Vikings.

He finished his rookie season in 2017 with 73 combined tackles (55 solo), six pass deflections, two interceptions, two touchdowns, a forced fumble, and a fumble recovery in 16 games and 16 starts.

==== 2018 ====
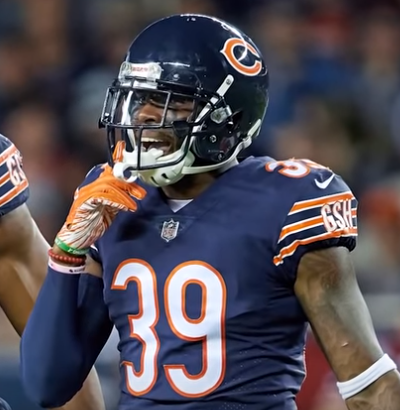
Jackson in a game against the Seattle Seahawks

Defensive coordinator Vic Fangio returned under the new Bears’ head coach Matt Nagy. Jackson and Adrian Amos subsequently retained their roles as the starting safeties in 2018. In Week 2, Jackson recorded three solo tackles, one pass deflection, and made his first career sack during a 24–17 win against the Seattle Seahawks. Jackson sacked Seahawks’ quarterback Russell Wilson for a two-yard loss during the second quarter. He recorded interceptions over the next two games off Arizona Cardinals' Sam Bradford (including a pick-six that was called back for an offside penalty) and Tampa Bay Buccaneers' Ryan Fitzpatrick. On November 4, 2018, Jackson recorded six combined tackles and returned a fumble recovery for a 65-yard touchdown during a 41–9 victory at the Buffalo Bills in Week 9. The following week, he collected a season-high six solo tackles and made two pass deflections during a 34–22 win against the Detroit Lions.

On November 18, 2018, Jackson deflected a pass and returned an interception for a 27-yard touchdown in the Bears’ 25–20 victory against the Vikings. Jackson intercepted a pass by Vikings’ quarterback Kirk Cousins, that was intended for wide receiver Laquon Treadwell, during the fourth quarter. The following week, he made three solo tackles, two pass deflections, and returned an interception for a 41-yard touchdown during a 23–16 win against the Lions. His interception off Matthew Stafford earned the Bears’ a comeback victory and earned Jackson the NFC Defensive Player of the Week. He was also declared the NFC Defensive Player of the Month for his performance during the month.

Against the Green Bay Packers in Week 15, Jackson intercepted Aaron Rodgers to snap Rodgers' record streak without an interception with 402 pass attempts. However, he suffered an ankle injury on the play, forcing him to miss playing time. In his place, Deon Bush started the Week 16 game against the San Francisco 49ers. On December 19, 2018, Jackson was named to the 2019 Pro Bowl roster. Jackson was inactive for the last two games due to an ankle injury (Weeks 16–17) and finished the season with 51 combined tackles (41 solo), 15 pass deflections, six interceptions, two forced fumbles, and three touchdowns in 14 games and 14 starts.

He received an overall grade of 93.2 from Pro Football Focus in 2018, which ranked as the best grade among all qualifying safeties. Jackson was also named to first-team All-Pro along with teammates Khalil Mack, Kyle Fuller, and Tarik Cohen. He was ranked 30th by his fellow players on the NFL Top 100 Players of 2019.

==== 2019 ====
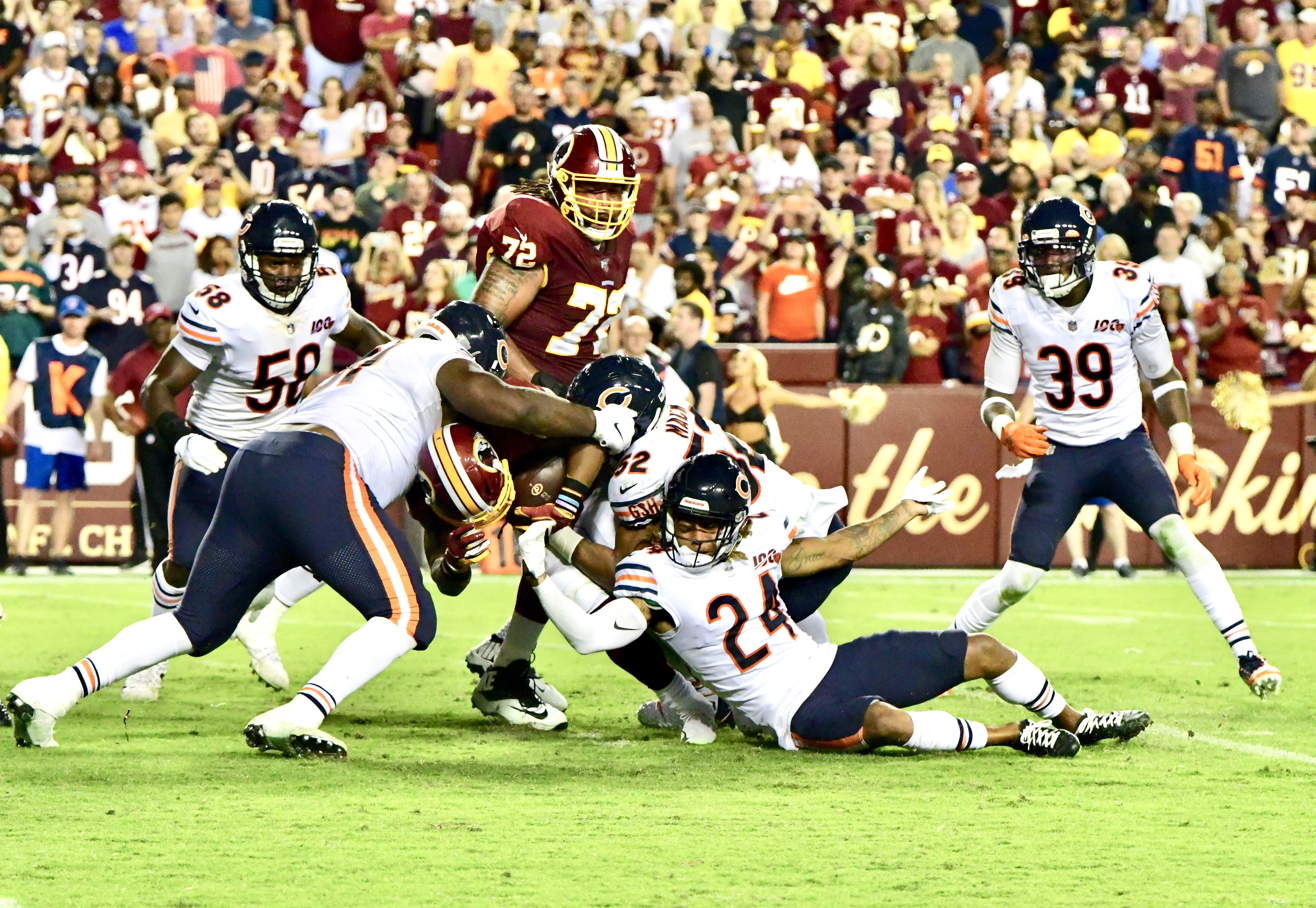
Jackson in a game against the Washington Redskins

Jackson made his return from injury in the 2019 season opener against the Packers. In the game, Jackson made two tackles as the Bears lost 10–3. The following week, the Bears won their first game of the season against the Denver Broncos, during which Jackson recorded 10 tackles. The next game against the Washington Redskins, he recovered a fumble forced by teammate Danny Trevathan in the 31–15 win.

In a Week 9 22–14 loss to the Philadelphia Eagles, Jackson had a team-high 11 tackles. During another loss in week 11 against the Los Angeles Rams, he forced a fumble on running back Todd Gurley II which was recovered by teammate Ha Ha Clinton-Dix.

On Thanksgiving Day against the Lions, Jackson recorded his first interception of the season off a pass thrown by rookie quarterback David Blough with 30 seconds left in the game, sealing a 24–20 Bears' win. In the following week's game against the Dallas Cowboys, Jackson recorded his first sack of the season on Dak Prescott as the Bears won 31–24.

On December 17, Jackson was named to the 2020 Pro Bowl as a starter. In week 17 against the Vikings, Jackson intercepted a pass thrown by Sean Mannion and returned it for 14 yards as time expired to seal a 21–19 Bears' win.

On January 3, 2020, the Bears signed Jackson to a four-year $58.4 million contract extension, making him the highest paid safety in the NFL.

Jackson started all 16 games in the 2019 season. He recorded 60 tackles, one sack, five passes defensed, two interceptions, one forced fumble, one fumble recovery, and five tackles for loss.

==== 2020 ====
In Week 6 against the Panthers, Jackson forced his first turnover of the season, forcing a fumble on former teammate Mike Davis which was recovered by the Bears, during the 23–16 win. In Week 7 against the Rams, Jackson led the team with nine tackles and recovered a fumble forced by teammate Robert Quinn on Robert Woods and returned it for an eight-yard touchdown during the 24–10 loss. Jackson was placed on the reserve/COVID-19 list by the team on November 23, 2020, and activated on November 27. In the 2020 season, Jackson recorded 82 total tackles (63 solo), five passes defended, and three forced fumbles in 16 games and starts.

==== 2021 ====
Jackson appeared in and started 14 games in the 2021 season. He finished with 76 total tackles (54 solo), two passes defended, and one forced fumble.

==== 2022 ====
Jackson started 12 games in 2022, where he recorded 80 tackles and four interceptions. He was named as a team captain following the mid-season departures of Roquan Smith and Robert Quinn. Jackson suffered a season-ending Lisfranc injury during a Week 12 loss to the New York Jets and was placed on injured reserve on November 29. He led the Bears in tackles and was leading all NFC free safeties in votes for the Pro Bowl at the time of his injury.

==== 2023 ====
Jackson played 12 games in 2023, recording 37 tackles and 1 interception. On February 15, 2024, Jackson was released by the Bears.

=== Baltimore Ravens ===
On July 19, 2024, Jackson signed with the Baltimore Ravens. He, along with fellow safety Marcus Williams, performed poorly, causing the Ravens to have one of the worst passing defenses in the NFL at the beginning of the season. Williams was then benched for Week 8's game against the Cleveland Browns with Jackson starting in his place. However, after Jackson had a horrendous performance, which included multiple dropped potential interceptions and giving up the game-winning touchdown in a 24–29 loss, he himself was benched for Week 9's game against the Denver Broncos with Williams replacing him. After another poor performance against the Cincinnati Bengals in Week 10, Jackson was benched for a second time. Jackson did not travel with the team for their Week 11 game against the Pittsburgh Steelers after expressing his dissatisfaction with his reduced role; he was subsequently waived on November 23.

=== Los Angeles Chargers ===
On December 23, 2024, Jackson was signed by the Los Angeles Chargers to their practice squad. He became a free agent when his contract expired following the season.

== NFL career statistics ==
Regular season statistics
Year	Team	Games		Tackles				Interceptions						Fumbles		
Year	Team	GP	GS	Comb	Solo	Ast	Sck	PD	Int	Yds	Avg	Lng	TD	FF	FR	TD
2017	CHI	16	16	73	55	18	0.0	6	2	82	41.0	76	1	1	3	1
2018	CHI	14	14	51	41	10	1.0	15	6	81	13.5	41	2	2	1	1
2019	CHI	16	16	60	51	9	1.0	5	2	18	9.0	14	0	1	1	0
2020	CHI	16	16	82	63	19	0.0	5	0	0	0.0	0	0	3	1	1
2021	CHI	14	14	76	54	22	0.0	2	0	0	0.0	0	0	1	0	0
2022	CHI	12	12	80	59	21	0.0	6	4	44	11.0	26	0	2	0	0
2023	CHI	12	12	37	32	5	0.0	5	1	27	27.0	27	0	0	0	0
2024	BAL	9	4	30	18	12	0.0	1	0	0	0.0	0	0	0	0	0
2024	LAC	2	0	0	0	0	0.0	0	0	0	0.0	0	0	0	0	0
Career		111	104	489	373	116	2.0	45	15	252	16.8	76	3	10	6	3

Postseason statistics
Year	Team	Games		Tackles				Interceptions						Fumbles		
Year	Team	GP	GS	Comb	Solo	Ast	Sck	PD	Int	Yds	Avg	Lng	TD	FF	FR	TD
2018	CHI	0	0	Did not play due to injury												
2020	CHI	1	1	6	6	0	0.0	0	0	0	0.0	0	0	0	0	0
2024	LAC	1	0	1	1	0	0.0	0	0	0	0.0	0	0	0	0	0
Career		2	1	7	7	0	0.0	0	0	0	0.0	0	0	0	0	0
