= James F. Lloyd =

American politician (1922–2012)

Jim Lloyd
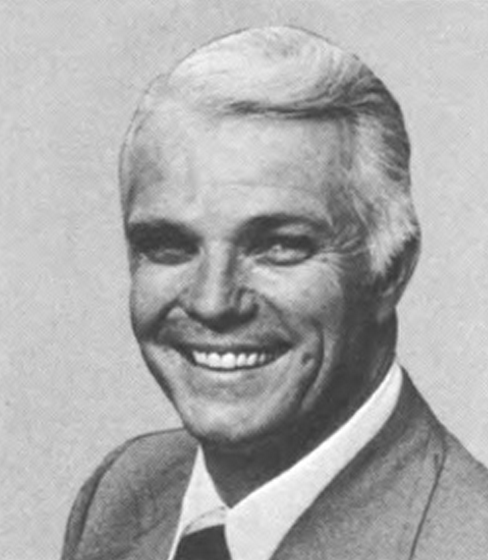

Member of the U.S. House of Representatives from California's 35th district
- In office January 3, 1975 – January 3, 1981
- Preceded by: Glenn M. Anderson
- Succeeded by: David Dreier

Personal details
- Born: James Frederick Lloyd; September 27, 1922 Helena, Montana
- Died: February 2, 2012 (aged 89) Pensacola, Florida
- Resting place: Arlington National Cemetery
- Party: Democratic
- Education: Stanford University

James Fredrick Lloyd (September 27, 1922 – February 2, 2012) was an American military officer, businessman, and politician who served three terms as Democratic United States Representative from 1975 to 1981.

== Career ==
Born in Helena, Montana, Lloyd attended public schools in Washington, California, and Oregon. He attended the University of Oregon from 1940 to 1942 but did not graduate.

He served in the United States Navy as a naval aviator from 1942 to 1963 (retired). These years included service in both World War II and the Korean War.

He attained his B.A. at Stanford University in 1958, and his M.A. in political science at University of Southern California in 1966. He pursued a public relations and advertising career, then later became a teacher and instructor of political science at Mt. San Antonio College in Walnut, California from 1970 to 1973.

=== State assembly ===
Lloyd was a member of the California Democratic State Central Committee from 1968 until 1972. He served as City Councilman of West Covina, California from 1968 to 1975, including a term as Mayor of West Covina from 1973 to 1974.

=== Congress ===
In 1974, he was narrowly elected as a Democrat to the Ninety-fourth Congress, representing a Republican-leaning district. He was reelected to the Ninety-fifth and Ninety-sixth Congresses, serving January 3, 1975 – January 3, 1981. He ran unsuccessfully for reelection in 1980, being unseated in the process by David Dreier.

Lloyd was a resident of West Covina, California.

== Death ==
Lloyd died in an auto accident after suffering a stroke while driving in Pensacola, Florida. He was 89. He was buried in Arlington National Cemetery

== Electoral history ==
1974 United States House of Representatives elections in California
Party	Candidate	Votes	%
Democratic	James F. Lloyd	60,709	50.3
Republican	Victor Veysey (Incumbent)	60,102	49.7
Total votes		120,811	100.0
Democratic gain from Republican			

1976 United States House of Representatives elections in California
Party	Candidate	Votes	%
Democratic	James F. Lloyd (Incumbent)	87,472	53.3
Republican	Louis Brutocao	76,765	46.7
Total votes		164,237	100.0
Democratic hold			

1978 United States House of Representatives elections in California
Party	Candidate	Votes	%
Democratic	James F. Lloyd (Incumbent)	80,388	54.0
Republican	David Dreier	68,442	46.0
Total votes		148,830	100.0
Democratic hold			

1980 United States House of Representatives elections in California
Party	Candidate	Votes	%
Republican	David Dreier	100,743	51.8
Democratic	James F. Lloyd (Incumbent)	88,279	45.4
Peace and Freedom	James Michael "Mike" Noonan	5,492	2.8
Total votes		194,514	100.0
Republican gain from Democratic			

== Sources ==
- United States Congress. "James F. Lloyd (id: L000379)". Biographical Directory of the United States Congress.

U.S. House of Representatives
Preceded by Glenn M. Anderson	Member of the U.S. House of Representatives from California's 35th congressional district January 3, 1975 – January 3, 1985	Succeeded by David Dreier
