= Metromix =

American entertainment website (1996–2014)

Metromix LLC
- Type: Subsidiary
- Founded: 1996
- Defunct: 2014
- Headquarters: Chicago, Illinois, 225 North Michigan Avenue Suite 1600; Chicago, IL 60601, U.S.
- Key people: Kara Walsh, CEO; Jim Marzullo, VP Operations & Business Development
- Parent: Chicago Tribune; Tribune Publishing
- Website: metromix.com (defunct)

Metromix LLC was a Chicago entertainment website at metromix.com, owned by the Chicago Tribune division of Tribune Publishing. Founded in 1996, it served the Chicago metropolitan area, later expanding – in a partnership with the Gannett Company – to serve additional designated market areas across the United States. After the Tribune/Gannett website partnership ended in 2014, the website ceased operation, with the Chicago Tribune redirecting all access to its own main website.

== History ==
Originally launched in 1996 as metromix.com by the Chicago Tribune, it was a local Chicago website targeting young, socially active adults looking for an insider's perspective on local trends and hotspots. Users were typically 21 to 34 years of age with significant disposable income and highly active social lives. It earned various awards including the EPpy Award for Best Entertainment Site and the Digital Edge Award for Best Advertising Program.

In 2007, Metromix became a joint venture between the media conglomerates Gannett Company and former Tribune Company.

A guide to local restaurants, bars and clubs, events, concerts and movies, Metromix became available in over 60 markets. In late 2009, the company launched 27 new sites to complete their presence in the top 50 designated market areas (DMA) of the United States, adding domain name adjustments to access each DMA, such as the original Chicago-focused material then being found at chicago.metromix.com.

The company introduced Metromix Deals, a suite of new features on its websites that showcase deals and specials to its visitors who use the sites to plan nights out in their cities.

Metromix also operated mobile sites, an iPhone app and in several markets, a Metromix-branded print publication or section within another publication, e.g., in RedEye in Chicago.

In October 2010, Metromix launched a new section to their site which offered aggregated deals in each respective market.

In 2012, Gannett and Tribune ended the Metromix partnership. Metromix longer offered a national presence and all references to cities besides Chicago were removed.

In 2014 Metromix was spun off with the Chicago Tribune as part of the new Tribune Publishing group. The website no longer exists, and any past links simply take the user to the entertainment section of the chicagotribune.com page of the Chicago Tribune.
