= Tim Golden (American football) =

American football player (born 1959)

No. 59, 91
- Positions: Linebacker, defensive end

Personal information
- Born: November 15, 1959 (age 66); Pahokee, Florida, U.S.
- Listed height: 6 ft 1 in (1.85 m)
- Listed weight: 220 lb (100 kg)

Career information
- High school: Lauderdale Lakes (FL) Boyd Anderson
- College: Florida
- NFL draft: 1982: undrafted

Career history
- New England Patriots (1982–1984); Indianapolis Colts (1985)*; Philadelphia Eagles (1985)
- * Offseason or practice squad member only

Awards and highlights
- Second-team All-SEC (1980)

Career NFL statistics
- Games played: 42
- Games started: 1
- Fumble recoveries: 3
- Stats at Pro Football Reference

Timothy George Golden (born November 15, 1959) is an American former professional football player who was a linebacker for four seasons in the National Football League (NFL) during the mid-1980s. Golden played college football for the Florida Gators, and thereafter, he played in the NFL for the New England Patriots and Philadelphia Eagles.

== Early life ==
Golden was born in the small town of Pahokee, Florida. He attended Boyd H. Anderson High School in Lauderdale Lakes, Florida, and played high school football for the Boyd Anderson Cobras.

== College career ==
Golden accepted an athletic scholarship to attend the University of Florida in Gainesville, Florida, where he played defensive end for coach Doug Dickey and coach Charley Pell's Gators teams from 1978 to 1980. As a junior in 1979, he lived through the worst season in the history of the Florida football program, when the Gators posted an 0–10–1 record. The following season, Golden was part of the biggest one-year turn-around in Division I football history, when the 1980 Gators finished 8–4 after defeating the Maryland Terrapins in the Tangerine Bowl. He was a second-team All-Southeastern Conference (SEC) selection and an honorable mention All-American in 1980.

Golden graduated from the University of Florida with a bachelor's degree in broadcasting in 1981.

== Professional career ==
Golden was signed by the New England Patriots as an undrafted free agent in 1982, and he played for the Patriots for three seasons from 1982 to 1984, primarily as a backup. He appeared in forty games for the Patriots, and played his final two games for the Philadelphia Eagles in 1985.

== See also ==
- Florida Gators football, 1970–79
- Florida Gators football, 1980–89
- List of Florida Gators in the NFL draft
- List of New England Patriots players
- List of Philadelphia Eagles players
- List of University of Florida alumni
