= Jane Healy (journalist) =

American journalist (1949–2026)

- Born: May 9, 1949; Washington, D.C, U.S.
- Died: May 15, 2026 (aged 77)
- Education: B.S., University of Maryland, 1971
- Occupation: Journalist
- Awards: Pulitzer Prize for Editorial Writing, 1988

Jane Elizabeth Healy (May 9, 1949 – May 15, 2026) was an American journalist. She was the recipient of the Orlando Sentinel's first Pulitzer Prize.

== Early life and education ==
Healy was born in Washington, D.C., on May 9, 1949, to parents Paul and Connie. She graduated from Bethesda-Chevy Chase High School in 1967 and attended the University of Maryland where she earned a Bachelor of Science degree in 1971.

== Career ==
After earning her bachelor's degree, Healy accepted a position as a copy aide at the New York Daily News, before moving to Florida to work for the Orlando Sentinel. In 1988, Healy became the first Sentinel writer to receive the Pulitzer Prize for Editorial Writing, for her series on the protesting against overdevelopment in Florida's Orange County. She was later awarded the Paul Hansell Award for Distinguished Achievement in Florida Journalism.

Healy eventually became the Sentinel's vice president and editorial page editor.

== Death ==
Healy died on May 15, 2026, at the age of 77.
