= Tamarac, Florida =

- City
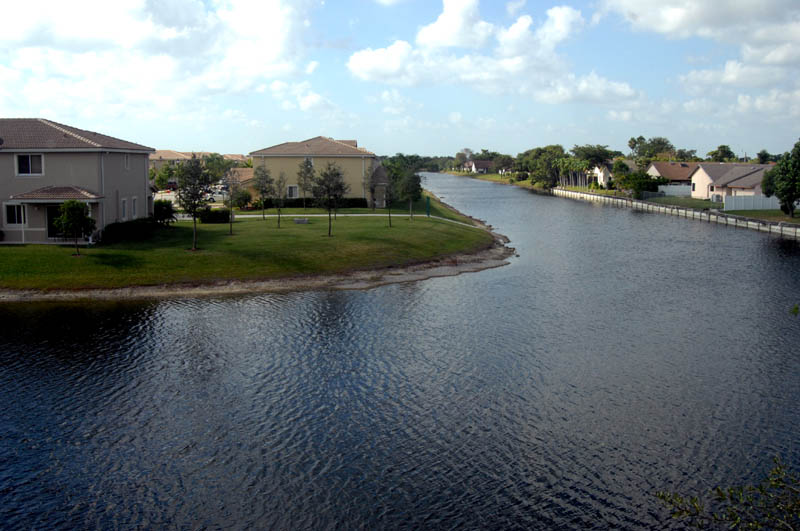
- Rear Canal waterway in Tamarac

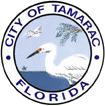
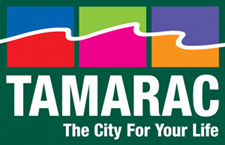
- Flag Seal Logo
- Motto: "The City For Your Life!"
- Location of Tamarac, Broward County, Florida
- Coordinates: 26°12′05″N 80°14′18″W
- Country: United States
- State: Florida
- County: Broward
- Incorporated: August 15, 1963

Government
  - Type: Commission-Manager

Area
  - City: 12.08 sq mi (31.28 km^{2})
  - Land: 11.59 sq mi (30.03 km^{2})
  - Water: 0.48 sq mi (1.25 km^{2})
- Elevation: 3 ft (0.91 m)

Population (2020)
  - City: 71,897
  - Density: 6,200.6/sq mi (2,394.08/km^{2})
  - Metro: 5,564,635
- Time zone: UTC-5 (Eastern (EST))
  - Summer (DST): UTC-4 (EDT)
- ZIP codes: 33309, 33319, 33320, 33321, 33351, 33359
- Area codes: 954, 754
- FIPS code: 12-70675
- GNIS feature ID: 2405567
- Website: www.tamarac.gov

Tamarac is a city in Broward County, Florida, United States. It is part of the Miami metropolitan area. At the 2020 census, the city had a population of 71,897.

== History ==
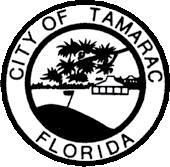
Monochromatic depiction of the city's first official seal, used from 1963 to 1991.

In the early 1960s a young developer named Ken Behring came from the Midwest and bought land where he could, creating an active adult community of two-bedroom maintenance-free homes. He called his new city Tamarac, named after the nearby Tamarac Country Club in Oakland Park.

In 1963, Behring built and Jesse Pilch sold the city's first development east of State Road 7, Tamarac Lakes Section One and Section Two. Next came homes built on a former orange grove called Tamarac Lakes North and Tamarac Lakes Boulevard. Four of Behring's last developments were Tamarac Lakes South, then the Mainlands of Tamarac Lakes just west of State Road 7, and finally the Woodlands community.

The city's early leaders, hoping to preserve Tamarac as a bedroom community, allowed Fort Lauderdale to annex commercial pockets, forever losing land that might have bolstered the city's coffers. In the late 1970s, the city de-annexed a long line of commercial buildings from State Road 7 all the way to Northwest 31 Avenue, but it went along with Behring's vision of Tamarac as a bedroom community. The boundaries were wherever Behring decided to build homes. The city's current eastern boundaries narrow to a sliver from Northwest 31 to 37 Avenues, then widen to the south. The city's easternmost boundary extends below Commercial Boulevard to Northwest 16 Avenue. City officials had once considered revising their east city limit lines to ensure efficient delivery of government services.

Behring also named a subdivision he built in the Pinellas Park area, the "Mainlands of Tamarac By-the-Gulf".

== Geography ==
According to the United States Census Bureau, the city has a total area of 12.1 square miles (31.3 km^{2}), of which 11.6 square miles (30.1 km^{2}) is land and 0.46 square miles (1.2 km^{2}) is water (3.92%).

=== Climate ===
Tamarac has a tropical climate, similar to the climate found in much of the Caribbean. It is part of the only region in the 48 contiguous states that falls under that category. More specifically, it generally has a tropical monsoon climate (Köppen climate classification, Am).

== Demographics ==
Historical population
| Census | Pop. | Note | %± |
|---|---|---|---|
| 1970 | 5,193 | | — |
| 1980 | 29,376 | | 465.7% |
| 1990 | 44,822 | | 52.6% |
| 2000 | 55,588 | | 24.0% |
| 2010 | 60,427 | | 8.7% |
| 2020 | 71,897 | | 19.0% |
U.S. Decennial Census

=== Racial and ethnic composition ===
Tamarac racial composition (Hispanics excluded from racial categories) (NH = Non-Hispanic)
| Race | Pop 2010 | Pop 2020 | % 2010 | % 2020 |
|---|---|---|---|---|
| White (NH) | 29,579 | 21,741 | 48.95% | 30.24% |
| Black or African American (NH) | 13,304 | 22,877 | 22.02% | 31.82% |
| Native American or Alaska Native (NH) | 73 | 69 | 0.12% | 0.10% |
| Asian (NH) | 1,504 | 2,223 | 2.49% | 3.09% |
| Pacific Islander or Native Hawaiian (NH) | 18 | 24 | 0.03% | 0.03% |
| Some other race (NH) | 274 | 673 | 0.45% | 0.94% |
| Two or more races/Multiracial (NH) | 962 | 2,415 | 1.59% | 3.36% |
| Hispanic or Latino (any race) | 14,713 | 21,875 | 24.35% | 30.43% |
| Total | 60,427 | 71,897 | | |

=== 2020 census ===
As of the 2020 census, Tamarac had a population of 71,897. The median age was 47.5 years. 16.8% of residents were under the age of 18 and 25.9% of residents were 65 years of age or older. For every 100 females there were 82.4 males, and for every 100 females age 18 and over there were 78.5 males age 18 and over.

100.0% of residents lived in urban areas, while 0.0% lived in rural areas.

There were 31,461 households in Tamarac, of which 23.3% had children under the age of 18 living in them. Of all households, 38.7% were married-couple households, 16.9% were households with a male householder and no spouse or partner present, and 38.1% were households with a female householder and no spouse or partner present. About 32.8% of all households were made up of individuals and 18.8% had someone living alone who was 65 years of age or older.

There were 34,006 housing units, of which 7.5% were vacant. The homeowner vacancy rate was 1.8% and the rental vacancy rate was 7.4%.

Racial composition as of the 2020 census
| Race | Number | Percent |
|---|---|---|
| White | 26,274 | 36.5% |
| Black or African American | 23,580 | 32.8% |
| American Indian and Alaska Native | 218 | 0.3% |
| Asian | 2,280 | 3.2% |
| Native Hawaiian and Other Pacific Islander | 30 | 0.0% |
| Some other race | 6,495 | 9.0% |
| Two or more races | 13,020 | 18.1% |
| Hispanic or Latino (of any race) | 21,875 | 30.4% |

=== 2010 census ===
As of the 2010 United States census, there were 60,427 people, 27,833 households, and 15,279 families residing in the city.

=== 2000 census ===
In 2000, the city the population was spread out, with 13.4% under the age of 18, 5.3% from 18 to 24, 23.5% from 25 to 44, 20.1% from 45 to 64, and 37.8% who were 65 years of age or older. The median age was 53 years. For every 100 females, there were 80.9 males. For every 100 females age 18 and over, there were 77.3 males.

As of 2000, 15.4% had children under the age of 18 living with them, 44.8% were married couples living together, 9.4% had a female householder with no husband present, and 42.6% were non-families. 36.3% of all households were made up of individuals, and 23.0% had someone living alone who was 65 years of age or older. The average household size was 2.00 and the average family size was 2.56.

In 2000, the median income for a household in the city was $34,290, and the median income for a family was $41,927. Males had a median income of $32,317 versus $28,360 for females. The per capita income for the city was $22,243. About 6.1% of families and 8.9% of the population were below the poverty line, including 13.5% of those under age 18 and 7.2% of those age 65 or over.

As of 2000, speakers of English language as a first language were at 78.08% of the population, while Spanish was at 13.69%. Also, Yiddish was at 1.90%, French at 1.15%, Haitian Creole consisted of 1.12%, Italian made up 1.08%, German comprised 0.62%, and Hebrew as a mother tongue made up 0.52% of residents.

Over the years, the multicultural population has expanded in Tamarac, such as people from Latin American and Caribbean ancestry. As of 2000, Tamarac was the fifty-first-most Colombian-populated area in the U.S., with 2.74% of the population. It also had the thirty-second-highest percentage of Jamaicans in the U.S., (tied with Royal Palm Beach and Goulds) at 4.1% of all residents.

== Education ==
Broward County Public Schools operates public schools.

Elementary schools in the Tamarac city limits include:

- Challenger Elementary School
- Tamarac Elementary School

Other elementary schools serving sections of Tamarac include Discovery Elementary School (Sunrise), Pinewood Elementary School (North Lauderdale), Park Lakes Elementary School (Lauderdale Lakes), Oriole Elementary School (Lauderdale Lakes), and Lloyd Estates Elementary School (Oakland Park).

Millennium 6–12 Collegiate Academy is the sole public secondary school in Tamarac; it was previously only a middle school, but its high school began operations in 2017. Tamarac has a middle school attendance zone serving the majority of the city (sections of the city limits west of NW 81 Avenue). High school students are not zoned to Tamarac; preference is given to those who attended Millennium middle, and those wishing to attend the high school must be eligible for dual-enrollment with Broward College. Other sections are served by Silver Lakes Middle School in North Lauderdale, Lauderdale Lakes Middle School in Lauderdale Lakes. and James S. Rickards Middle School in Oakland Park.

Much of Tamarac is zoned to J. P. Taravella High School in Coral Springs, and Piper High School in Sunrise, with Taravella serving northern areas and Piper serving southern areas. Other sections are assigned to Boyd H. Anderson High School in Lauderdale Lakes and Northeast High School in Oakland Park.

The Roman Catholic Archdiocese of Miami operates Saint Malachy School in Tamarac.
