= Millennium 6–12 Collegiate Academy =

Secondary school in Florida, United States

Coordinates: 26.1967°N 80.2775°W

Millennium 6–12 Collegiate Academy, previously Millennium Middle School, is a secondary (middle and high) school in Tamarac, Florida. It is a part of Broward County Public Schools.

Students living in an attendance zone are assigned to Millennium for middle school; this includes sections of Tamarac, a section of Lauderhill, and a section of North Lauderdale. There is no automatic zoning for Millennium High; admission into this program, with preference given for students who attended Millennium Middle, is based on students being eligible to dual-enroll with Broward College.

== History ==
The first 9th grade class opened in 2017, making Millennium the first public high school in Tamarac as well as being the city's sole public middle school. The first 9th grade class had 80 students. The high school was to move into a three-story building constructed in 2006 that was originally made for 6th graders. There had been an increase in high school-aged children in the Tamarac area.
