= El Sentinel (Orlando) =

- Type: Weekly newspaper
- Format: Broadsheet
- Owner(s): Tribune Publishing
- Founded: 2001
- Headquarters: 633 North Orange Avenue; Orlando, Florida 32801; US
- Website: elsentinelorlando.com

El Sentinel, also known as El Sentinel de Orlando, was a weekly Spanish-language newspaper published in Orlando, Florida by Tribune Publishing. It was a sister paper to the Orlando Sentinel and catered to Central Florida's Hispanic communities, a population that had grown significantly in size since the 1980s, discussing news, entertainment, and sports.

The paper was published on Saturdays and could be found at local distribution points or included with a subscription to the Orlando Sentinel at no additional cost.

It was announced the paper would cease publication on Dec. 3, 2022.
