= Justin Dearborn =

American businessman (born c. 1971)

- Born: 1971 (age 54–55)
- Education: Illinois State University (BS); DePaul University (JD)
- Occupations: Businessman, publisher

Justin Dearborn (born c. 1971) is an American businessman. He formerly served as the chairman and chief executive officer of the Tribune Publishing Company, a newspaper publishing company listed on the New York Stock Exchange and NASDAQ.

== Early life ==
Dearborn was born circa 1971. He graduated from Illinois State University with a bachelor's degree and he received a J.D. from the DePaul University College of Law.

== Career ==
Dearborn began his career at Motorola, and later worked for Click Commerce. He was the managing director and general counsel of Merrick Ventures, a private equity firm. He served as the chief executive officer of Merge Healthcare from August 2013 to October 2015, when it merged with IBM for $1 billion.

Dearborn was appointed as the chief executive officer of Tribune Publishing in February 2016 and as its chairman in March 2018, replacing Michael Ferro. He stepped down from both roles in January 2019.
