= Lauderdale Lakes, Florida =

- City
- City of Lauderdale Lakes
- Flag Seal
- Nickname: "The Heart of Broward County"
- Motto(s): "We Care!" & "Life in Full Color"
- Location of Lauderdale Lakes in Broward County in State of Florida
- Coordinates: 26°10′06″N 80°12′06″W
- Country: United States
- State: Florida
- County: Broward
- Incorporated: June 22, 1961

Government
  - Type: Commission-Manager

Area
  - City: 3.73 sq mi (9.66 km^{2})
  - Land: 3.68 sq mi (9.53 km^{2})
  - Water: 0.046 sq mi (0.12 km^{2}) 1.37%
- Elevation: 10 ft (3.0 m)

Population (2020)
  - City: 35,954
  - Density: 9,768.1/sq mi (3,771.49/km^{2})
  - Metro: 5,564,635
- Time zone: UTC-5 (EST)
  - Summer (DST): UTC-4 (EDT)
- ZIP codes: 33309, 33311, 33313, 33319
- Area codes: 754, 954
- FIPS code: 12-39525
- GNIS feature ID: 2404887
- Website: http://www.lauderdalelakes.org

Lauderdale Lakes is a city in Broward County, Florida, United States. It is part of the Miami metropolitan area. As of the 2020 United States census, the city's population was 35,954.

== History ==
The city of Lauderdale Lakes was incorporated on June 22, 1961, and was originally popular as a retirement area for "snowbirds". Toward the end of the 20th century, Lauderdale Lakes became a predominantly Caribbean and African American community.

== Geography ==
The City of Lauderdale Lakes is located in central Broward County.

It is bordered by the city of Tamarac on its north, by the city of Lauderhill on its west and south, by the city of Oakland Park on its east, and by the city of Fort Lauderdale on its southeast.

According to the United States Census Bureau, the city has a total area of 3.64 square miles (9.43 km^{2}), of which 3.59 square miles (9.30 km^{2}) is land and .05 square miles (0.13 km^{2}) (1.37%) is water.

=== Climate ===
Lauderdale Lakes has a tropical climate, similar to the climate found in much of the Caribbean. It is part of the only region in the 48 contiguous states that falls under that category. More specifically, it generally has a tropical rainforest climate (Köppen climate classification: Af), bordering a tropical monsoon climate (Köppen climate classification: Am).

== Demographics ==
Historical population
Census	Pop.	Note	%±
1970	10,577		—
1980	25,426		140.4%
1990	27,341		7.5%
2000	31,705		16.0%
2010	32,593		2.8%
2020	35,954		10.3%
U.S. Decennial Census

=== Racial and ethnic composition ===
Lauderdale Lakes city, Florida – Racial and ethnic composition Note: the US Census treats Hispanic/Latino as an ethnic category. This table excludes Latinos from the racial categories and assigns them to a separate category. Hispanics/Latinos may be of any race.
Race / Ethnicity (NH = Non-Hispanic)	Pop 2000	Pop 2010	Pop 2020	% 2000	% 2010	% 2020
White alone (NH)	6,726	3,682	2,107	21.21%	11.30%	5.86%
Black or African American alone (NH)	21,243	25,887	29,985	67.00%	79.43%	83.40%
Native American or Alaska Native alone (NH)	33	58	44	0.10%	0.18%	0.12%
Asian alone (NH)	328	395	409	1.03%	1.21%	1.14%
Native Hawaiian or Pacific Islander alone (NH)	18	7	4	0.06%	0.02%	0.01%
Other race alone (NH)	130	105	209	0.41%	0.32%	0.58%
Mixed race or Multiracial (NH)	1,472	696	873	4.64%	2.14%	2.43%
Hispanic or Latino (any race)	1,755	1,763	2,323	5.54%	5.41%	6.46%
Total	31,705	32,593	35,954	100.00%	100.00%	100.00%

=== 2020 census ===
As of the 2020 census, Lauderdale Lakes had a population of 35,954. The median age was 39.4 years. 23.2% of residents were under the age of 18 and 17.3% of residents were 65 years of age or older. For every 100 females there were 84.4 males, and for every 100 females age 18 and over there were 79.5 males age 18 and over.

100.0% of residents lived in urban areas, while 0.0% lived in rural areas.

There were 12,910 households, including 7,779 family households, of which 34.8% had children under the age of 18 living in them. Of all households, 32.8% were married-couple households, 19.2% were households with a male householder and no spouse or partner present, and 42.2% were households with a female householder and no spouse or partner present. About 26.9% of all households were made up of individuals and 12.6% had someone living alone who was 65 years of age or older.

There were 15,753 housing units, of which 18.0% were vacant. The homeowner vacancy rate was 2.3% and the rental vacancy rate was 6.2%.

Racial composition as of the 2020 census
Race	Number	Percent
White	2,495	6.9%
Black or African American	30,266	84.2%
American Indian and Alaska Native	73	0.2%
Asian	419	1.2%
Native Hawaiian and Other Pacific Islander	6	0.0%
Some other race	894	2.5%
Two or more races	1,801	5.0%
Hispanic or Latino (of any race)	2,323	6.5%

=== Ancestry ===
In 2018, 50.5% (17.3k) of residents reported having West Indian ancestry, the highest share in Broward County. 47% (7,697) reported Jamaica as their country of birth while 31.2% (5,115) reported Haiti as their country of birth. 2.1% (343) reported Trinidad and Tobago as their country of birth. 1.6% (254) reported The Bahamas as their country of birth.

As of 2018, Lauderdale Lakes still maintains its record of having the second highest percentage of Jamaicans in the US. However, Jamaicans now make up 25.4% of the population. This is also the highest in the state of Florida.

=== 2010 census ===
As of the 2010 United States census, there were 32,593 people, 12,080 households, and 7,794 families residing in the city.

=== 2000 census ===
In 2000, 32.1% had children under the age of 18 living with them, 36.7% were married couples living together, 22.2% had a female householder with no husband present, and 36.0% were non-families. 30.1% of all households were made up of individuals, and 16.9% had someone living alone who was 65 years of age or older. The average household size was 2.59 and the average family size was 3.25.

In 2000, the city the population was spread out, with 27.7% under the age of 18, 8.7% from 18 to 24, 26.9% from 25 to 44, 18.9% from 45 to 64, and 17.9% who were 65 years of age or older. The median age was 36 years. For every 100 females, there were 81.1 males. For every 100 females age 18 and over, there were 75.2 males.

As of 2000, the median income for a household in the city was $26,932, and the median income for a family was $32,641. Males had a median income of $26,087 versus $20,434 for females. The per capita income for the city was $14,039. About 19.9% of families and 22.5% of the population were below the poverty line, including 32.9% of those under age 18 and 16.9% of those age 65 or over.

As of 2000, 71.97% of city residents spoke English as their first language, while 14.48% spoke French Creole, 6.66% spoke Spanish, 4.11% were French speakers, and 0.92% of the population spoke Yiddish.

As of 2000, Lauderdale Lakes has the second highest percentage of Jamaicans in the US, with 18.80% of the population (the neighborhood of Blue Hills, Connecticut was the only US area that had a higher concentration of Jamaicans, with 23.90% total.) It also had the sixth highest percentage of Haitian residents, with 15.70% of the population.

== Government ==
Until 1998 Lauderdale Lakes was governed by a mayor–council form of government, but elected that year to change to a mayor-commission-manager style of government. The mayor of Lauderdale Lakes is Veronica Edwards Phillips, who was elected in November 2022.

== Media ==
Lauderdale Lakes is a part of the Miami-Fort Lauderdale-Hollywood media market, which is the twelfth largest radio market and the seventeenth largest television market in the United States. Its primary daily newspapers are the South Florida Sun-Sentinel and The Miami Herald, and their Spanish-language counterparts El Sentinel and El Nuevo Herald.

== Economy ==
The sporting goods retailer Sports Authority had its headquarters in the city until 2003, when the firm merged with Gart Sports.

== Education ==
Broward County Public Schools operates public schools.

Public elementary schools:

- Castle Hill Elementary School (Lauderhill)
- Oriole Elementary School (Lauderdale Lakes)
- Park Lakes Elementary School (Lauderdale Lakes)
- Rock Island Elementary School (Fort Lauderdale)

Public middle public schools:

- Lauderdale Lakes Middle School (Lauderdale Lakes)
- William Dandy Middle School (Fort Lauderdale)

Public high school:

- Boyd Anderson High School (Lauderdale Lakes)

Other public school:

- Lauderhill 6-12 School (Lauderhill) In addition residents of the Lauderhill Middle School zone have priority for applying to the Lauderhill 6–12 high school program.

Private school:

- St. Helen School (Lauderdale Lakes) The Roman Catholic Archdiocese of Miami operates area Catholic schools.

== Notable people ==
- Glenn Greenwald, journalist
- Eddie Jackson, NFL free agent and safety for the Chicago Bears
- Ryan Shazier, former NFL linebacker and philanthropist
