= El Sentinel del Sur de la Florida =

Spanish-language newspaper, Ft. Lauderdale, Florida, US

El Sentinel del Sur de Florida (Spanish for "South Florida Sentinel") is a weekly Spanish-language newspaper published in Deerfield Beach, Florida by the South Florida Sun Sentinel Company, a subsidiary of Tribune Publishing of Chicago, which also publishes the South Florida Sun-Sentinel. El Sentinel began publication on October 12, 2002.

The newspaper's main competitor in the South Florida metropolitan area is El Nuevo Herald, the Spanish edition of the Miami Herald.

El Sentinel covers all Florida and is mainly distributed in Palm Beach and Broward counties.

== See also ==
- El Sentinel Orlando
