= Sea Ranch Lakes, Florida =

- Village
- Village of Sea Ranch Lakes
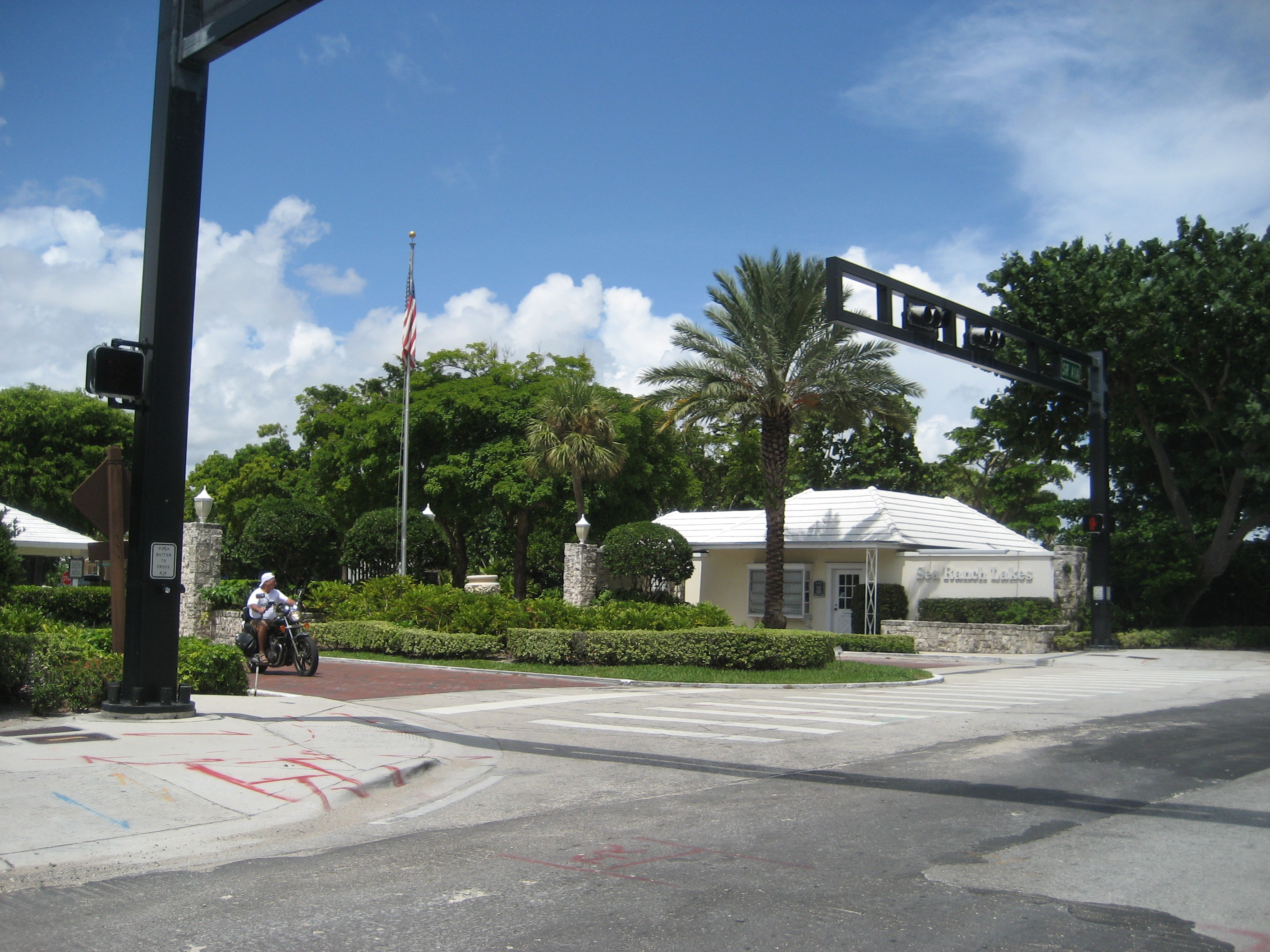
- Gatehouse to Sea Ranch Lakes gated community, 2007

- Seal

- Location of Sea Ranch Lakes in Broward County, Florida
- Coordinates: 26°12′02″N 80°05′53″W
- Country: United States
- State: Florida
- County: Broward
- Founded (Ausherman Tract): c. 1926-1929
- Unincorporated (Sea Ranch): c. 1930-1959
- Incorporated (Village of Sea Ranch Lakes): October 6, 1959

Government
  - Type: Mayor-Council
  - Mayor: Herbert G. Yardley
  - Councilmembers: Douglas "Doug" Hodgson, Charles "Chad" Volkert, Slava Borshchukov, Denise Bryan, and Jason Robichaux
  - Village Clerk: Starr Paton
  - Village Attorney: Donald J. Doody

Area
  - Total: 0.19 sq mi (0.49 km^{2})
  - Land: 0.17 sq mi (0.45 km^{2})
  - Water: 0.015 sq mi (0.04 km^{2})
- Elevation: 0 ft (0 m)

Population (2020)
  - Total: 540
  - Density: 3,104.0/sq mi (1,198.46/km^{2})
- Time zone: UTC−05:00 (Eastern (EST))
  - Summer (DST): UTC−04:00 (EDT)
- ZIP Code: 33308
- Area codes: 954, 754
- FIPS code: 12-64725
- GNIS feature ID: 2407543
- Website: searanchlakesfl.org

Sea Ranch Lakes is a village in Broward County, Florida, United States. The village is part of the Miami metropolitan area of South Florida. It is located on North Ocean Drive (Highway A1A) and is surrounded by Lauderdale-by-the-Sea. The majority of the village is a gated community, with the remainder being a public shopping plaza and a private beach club for village residents, with a pool and access to Sea Ranch Lakes Beach. The population was 540 at the 2020 census.

== History ==
Between 1926 and 1929, the plot of beachfront land was known as the "Ausherman Tract" (named after C.C. Ausherman, who was the first president of Fort Lauderdale's Realty Board), and was first owned by realtor Lovick Miller wanted to sell the oceanfront property north of Lauderdale-by-the-Sea, who bought that land in 1926, before the Great Depression. Around 1928 or 1929, he sold it to another Fort Lauderdale pioneer, John Lochrie. Soon after, Lochrie wanted to sell the area, and Miller suggested Robert Hayes Gore (R.H. Gore) as a potential buyer.

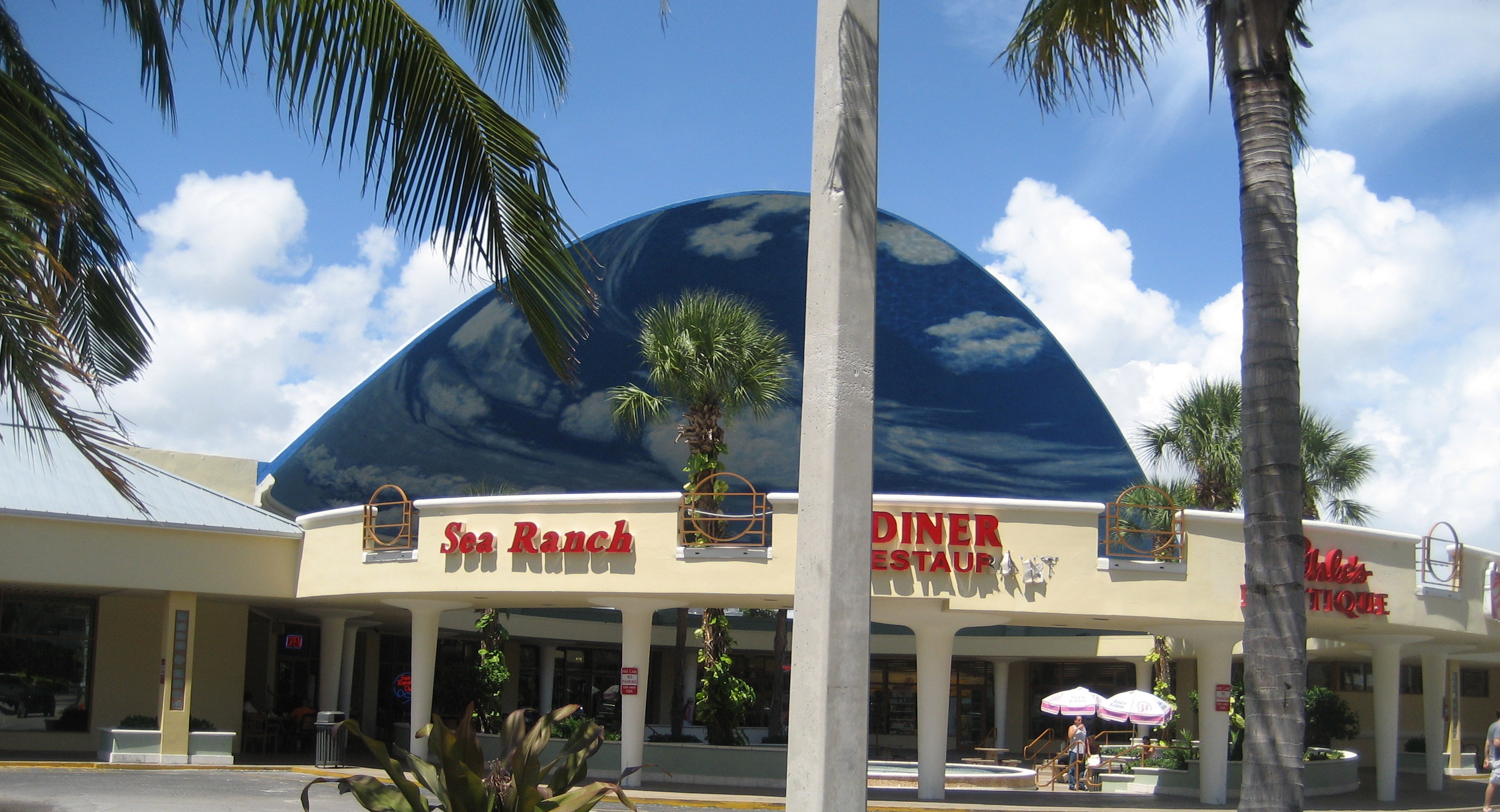
Sea Ranch Center is a strip mall with a number of shops

R.H. Gore, who purchased Fort Lauderdale News in 1929, and by 1930, owned 32 properties that were mostly in Downtown Fort Lauderdale, initially had no interest in buying the land because it was too far north from his house, businesses, and other downtown properties. He later decided to have ownership of the land because the price went down to $25,000 during the Great Depression and Miller convinced Gore that he could make at least $100,000 on the land once the economy boomed again.

The first structure built on the 45 acres (18 ha) with 1,800 feet (549 m) of seashore, where Gore and his family opened the Sea Ranch Cabana Club in 1939. It was a membership organization that later became a public seaside club that offered 20 cabanas with individual dressing rooms and other amenities, and it also had a dining room with a bar overlooking the Atlantic Ocean. The Sea Ranch Hotel was built the next year, in 1940, and was remodeled in 1949, with more than 60 rooms, a bar named Hayloft, additional dining areas, and a stable where guests could ride.

In 1956, the walled, residential, gated community underwent development. Its lots are bordered by the Intracoastal Waterway and encircling two lakes. The residential area, where Gore eventually ended up living in, was part of his original purchase before buying and expanding the village borders.

The Village of Sea Ranch Lakes was named after the oceanside "Sea Ranch" Hotel, which was across from North Ocean Drive, the gated community's main, public road. The "Lakes" part was added because of the residential village's two artificial, freshwater lakes. The private road leading into the village's entrance is Gatehouse Drive (named after the guardhouse that mimics a gatehouse, which in actuality is their own police station).

Sea Ranch Lakes was officially incorporated as a municipality on October 6, 1959.

The village's namesake, the Sea Ranch Hotel, closed in the early 1980s when the property was sold, demolished, and replaced by the Sea Ranch Lakes Condominiums.

== Geography ==
According to the United States Census Bureau, the village has a total area of 0.2 square miles (0.52 km^{2}), of which 0.04 square miles (0.10 km^{2}), or 18.18%, is water.

To its north:

- Lauderdale-by-the-Sea

To its south:

- Lauderdale-by-the-Sea

To its east:

- Atlantic Ocean

To its west:

- Intracoastal Waterway
- Fort Lauderdale

== Climate ==
The Village of Sea Ranch Lakes has a tropical climate, similar to the climate found in much of the Caribbean. It is part of the only region in the 48 contiguous states that falls under that category. More specifically, it generally has a tropical savanna climate (Köppen climate classification: Aw), bordering a tropical monsoon climate (Köppen climate classification: Am).

== Demographics ==
Historical population
Census	Pop.	Note	%±
1960	170		—
1970	660		288.2%
1980	584		−11.5%
1990	619		6.0%
2000	1,392		124.9%
2010	670		−51.9%
2020	540		−19.4%
U.S. Decennial Census

=== 2010 and 2020 census ===
Sea Ranch Lakes racial composition (Hispanics excluded from racial categories) (NH = Non-Hispanic)
Race	Pop 2010	Pop 2020	% 2010	% 2020
White (NH)	592	408	88.36%	75.56%
Black or African American (NH)	3	7	0.45%	1.30%
Native American or Alaska Native (NH)	0	0	0.00%	0.00%
Asian (NH)	4	19	0.60%	3.52%
Pacific Islander or Native Hawaiian (NH)	0	1	0.00%	0.19%
Some other race (NH)	2	3	0.30%	0.56%
Two or more races/Multiracial (NH)	4	22	0.60%	4.07%
Hispanic or Latino (any race)	65	80	9.70%	14.81%
Total	670	540		

As of the 2020 United States census, there were 540 people, 175 households, and 145 families residing in the village.

As of the 2010 United States census, there were 670 people, 320 households, and 242 families residing in the village.

=== 2000 census ===
In 2000, 14.5% had children under the age of 18 living with them, 56.3% were married couples living together, 3.6% had a female householder with no husband present, and 39.5% were non-families. 34.3% of all households were made up of individuals, and 19.3% had someone living alone who was 65 years of age or older. The average household size was 2.00 and the average family size was 2.56.

In 2000, the village population was spread out, with 14.5% under the age of 18, 2.1% from 18 to 24, 14.7% from 25 to 44, 32.5% from 45 to 64, and 36.1% who were 65 years of age or older. The median age was 57 years. For every 100 females, there were 83.4 males. For every 100 females age 18 and over, there were 82.8 males.

In 2000, the median income for a household in the village was $62,813, and the median income for a family was $85,729. Males had a median income of $62,765 versus $42,500 for females. The per capita income for the village was $60,088. About 6.7% of families and 7.0% of the population were below the poverty line, including 9.8% of those under age 18 and 3.2% of those age 65 or over.

As of 2000, speakers of English as a first language were at 85.50%, with Spanish at 6.02%, French at 3.58%, Portuguese at 2.85%, and Italian at 2.03%.

As of 2000, the village had the 19th highest percentage of Brazilians in the U.S. (tied with Revere, Massachusetts and Malden, Massachusetts) at 1.7% of the population, while it was the 60th most Peruvian-populated area at 1.01% of all residents (tied with Brentwood, New York).

== Government ==
Sea Ranch Lakes has seven village council members and one mayor. All elected officials serve two-year terms. The village was incorporated on October 6, 1959, because residents in the original gated community feared that they would be forcibly annexed by Fort Lauderdale, Lauderdale-by-the-Sea, or Pompano Beach. By incorporating itself as a municipality within Broward County, it can remain indefinitely autonomous. The village is unique in that it owns no property within its municipal borders. All roads, streets, parks, and lakes are private property owned by the Sea Ranch Beach Club. Because all property in the village is private land, the Sea Ranch Lakes Police Department is legally allowed to deny access to residential areas of the village to non-residents through the use of the village's main gate.

The Sea Ranch Beach Club owns all property within the village, including the oceanfront property on which the actual beach clubhouse and pool are built. The beach club has members who are elected to serve on its board of directors; they are responsible for maintaining all of the beach club's property, such as roads, street lights, and street signs. All major issues that affect the beach club must be voted upon by its members, and all residents of Sea Ranch Lakes are allotted one vote for each parcel of property he/she owns. There are annual membership dues to the Sea Ranch Lakes Beach Club that all residents must pay in addition to their annual property taxes. These membership dues to the beach club are used for capital improvements such as street repaving, painting of the beach club, and salaries of the employees that manage the beach club and maintain its property.

== Public services ==
=== Police ===
Law enforcement services to the village are provided by the Sea Ranch Lakes Police Department, which patrols the walled-in residential section of the village, the oceanfront beach club, and the shopping plaza within the village's municipal boundaries. The department has approximately 15 certified police officers and is led by Chief James O'Brien. Chief O'Brien retired from the Rochester NY Police Department as a captain and has over 40 years of law enforcement experience. Traditionally the department was staffed by former officers of the New York Police Department. Current members reflect officers from neighboring South Florida agencies as well as former state and federal law enforcement agencies. The department is dispatched by the Broward County Sheriff's Office 911 communications and responds as District 26. The department has six (6)patrol vehicles and a minimum of two sworn officers on duty at all times, with a normal weekday staffing of two officers, one police service aide, and the police chief.

The department prides itself on its low crime rate, with the majority offenses occurring within the commercial plaza. In the early 1980s, the department was one of the first in Broward County to have developed a formal hurricane emergency policy. Supplementing uniform patrol efforts, the department has detectives who are responsible for conducting most criminal investigations. The Sea Ranch Lakes Police Department has partnered with area law enforcement agencies through signed Memorandums of Understanding (M.O.U.) to address jurisdictional and/or resource issues that might be associated with any major occurrence.

The department provides all first responder services and assumes responsibility for such matters as Animal Control and residential security checks. The department renders "Mutual Aid Assistance" to other Law enforcement agencies operating primarily along the coast.

The department sadly has experienced the line of duty death of one of its patrol officers, Sergeant Henry Nelson Adams, in 1975. Sergeant Adams suffered a fatal heart attack while conducting a traffic stop, and died at the age of 50 after having served with the department for four years.

=== Fire and medical services ===
Fire and emergency medical services to Sea Ranch Lakes are provided by the Pompano Beach Fire Department. The village averages fewer than 100 calls for fire or medical services each year, with many being for services to the shopping plaza or residential fire alarms in the village. The village also averages less than one working structure fire per year. Throughout the history of the village, fire services have varied with each contract. Broward County Fire Rescue, the Lauderdale-by-the-Sea Volunteer Fire Department, and Fort Lauderdale Fire-Rescue have all provided fire suppression services to the village at some point.

The lowest bidder for fire services is usually awarded the four-year contract for services to the village. Before 1996, the Lauderdale-by-the-Sea Volunteer Fire Department served the town, with Fort Lauderdale Fire-Rescue serving until 2001. The Broward County Sheriff's Office Department of Fire Rescue & Emergency Services provided fire suppression services to the town from 2001 until 2008. As of October 2008, the Pompano Beach Fire Department provides services after Broward County Sheriff's Office closed its station in Lauderdale-by-the-Sea.

=== Utilities ===
Water services are provided to the town by the Fort Lauderdale Water Department. The residential section of the village has no sewer system, with each resident having an individual septic system. However, the shopping plaza is connected to the Pompano Beach sewer system. Power services are provided to the town by Florida Power & Light, with all residential power lines being buried underground. By having no utility poles inside the village, it is relatively easy to return power to the entire village following a storm, and is also aesthetically pleasing.

=== Public works ===
The employees of the Sea Ranch Lakes Beach Club are responsible for maintaining all of the villages lakes, parks, streets, and other property.

== Education ==
Residents are within the Broward County Public Schools district. It is zoned to McNab Elementary School, Pompano Beach Middle School, and Northeast High School.

In addition the community is in the service area of the magnet school Pompano Beach High School.
