= List of schools in Fort Lauderdale =

Public education in Fort Lauderdale is served by Broward County Public Schools. BCPS operates sixteen elementary schools, four middle schools, and three high schools within the city limits.

== Public elementary schools ==
- Bayview Elementary School
- Bennett Elementary School
- Croissant Park Elementary School
- Dillard Elementary School
- Stephen Foster Elementary School
- Harbordale Elementary School
- Lauderdale Manors Elementary School
- Thurgood Marshall Elementary School
- North Fork Elementary School
- North Side Elementary School
- Riverland Elementary School
- Rock Island Elementary School
- Sunland Park Elementary School
- Walker Elementary School
- Westwood Heights Elementary School
- Virginia Shuman Young Elementary School

== Public middle schools ==
- William Dandy Middle School
- New River Middle School
- Sunrise Middle School
- James S Rickards middle

Parkway Middle School

== Public high schools ==
- Dillard High School
- Fort Lauderdale High School
- Northeast High School
- Stranahan High School
- Sheridan Technical High School

== Other public schools that serve Fort Lauderdale students ==
Several schools outside the city limits have attendance areas that include portions of the city of Fort Lauderdale. Boyd H. Anderson High School in Lauderdale Lakes, Northeast High School in Oakland Park, South Plantation High School in Plantation, and Nova High School in Davie are four public high schools outside the city limits that serve students who live within.

Martin Luther King Jr. Elementary School and Meadowbrook Elementary School are two elementary schools that fall into the same category, though they are located in unincorporated areas.

== Private schools ==
A few private schools located within the city of Fort Lauderdale are:

- University School of Nova Southeastern University
- Pine Crest School
- Cardinal Gibbons High School
- Westminster Academy
- St. Thomas Aquinas High School
- Calvary Christian School
- Saint Anthony Catholic School
- Saint Coleman Catholic School
