= List of schools in Coral Springs, Florida =

Public primary and secondary education in Coral Springs, Florida is handled by the Broward County Public Schools district (BCPS). BCPS operates three high schools, four middle schools and 12 elementary schools within Coral Springs. Three charter schools and seven private schools also operate within the city.

== High schools ==
- Coral Glades High School
- Coral Springs High School
- J. P. Taravella High School

A portion of the city limits is zoned to Marjory Stoneman Douglas High School in Parkland.

In addition the community is in the service area of the magnet school Pompano Beach High School.

== Middle schools ==
- Coral Springs Middle School
- Forest Glen Middle School
- Ramblewood Middle School
- Sawgrass Springs Middle School

A portion of the city limits is zoned to Westglades Middle School in Parkland.

== Elementary schools ==
- Coral Park Elementary School
- Coral Springs Elementary School
- Country Hills Elementary School
- Eagle Ridge Elementary School
- Forest Hills Elementary School
- James S. Hunt Elementary School
- Maplewood Elementary School
- Parkside Elementary School
- Park Springs Elementary School
- Ramblewood Elementary School
- Riverside Elementary School
- Westchester Elementary School

A portion of the city limits is in the geographic priority area for Heron Heights Elementary in Parkland, while the other choice is Park Trails Elementary in Parkland, and with Riverglades, also in Parkland being the backup choice.

== Charter schools ==
- Broward Community Charter School
- Broward Community Charter School West
- Coral Springs Charter School
- Imagine Charter School at Broward
- Renaissance Charter School At Coral Springs

== Private schools ==
- Academy High School
- Atlantis Academy
- Coral Baptist School
- Coral Springs Christian Academy
- Creative Child Learning Center
- North Broward Preparatory Schools
- Saint Andrew Catholic School
- The Day School at Coral Springs

== Public schools serving Coral Springs outside its city limits ==
Additionally, three public schools in neighboring Parkland serve portions of Coral Springs:

- Marjory Stoneman Douglas High School
- Westglades Middle School
- Park Trails Elementary School
