= Yvonne Gonzalez =

American school superintendent

Yvonne Gonzalez is a former school superintendent, serving in that capacity in the Dallas Independent School District (DISD) in 1997 as well as in Santa Fe Public Schools from 1994 to 1996. She also served as interim superintendent of the Houston Independent School District (HISD) in 1994. Her career in education ended after a conviction in federal court for embezzling money from DISD.

== Early life and career ==
Gonzalez was born in Brownsville, Texas, but she grew up in Laredo, Texas. She received her undergraduate degree from St. Mary's University. She initially became a secondary level teacher in the San Antonio Independent School District (SAISD). She first worked as a principal in San Antonio before working as an instructor at Texas A&M University and Old Dominion University. During her career she got master's and doctoral degrees at Stephen F. Austin University and Texas A&M University, with the latter conferred in 1987.

Houston Independent School District (HISD) superintendent Joan Raymond recruited her as a school administrator. In Spring 1990 she was the principal of Sharpstown Middle School. From 1990 to 1991 she was the principal of Robert E. Lee High School, now known as Wisdom High School. In 1994, after superintendent Frank Petruzielo left the district, the school district voted 6-1 to make Gonzalez the interim superintendent; the school district board members described this as a "symbolic" motion as Gonzalez was the first Hispanic interim superintendent. Gonzalez served until Rod Paige became the superintendent.

She became superintendent of the Santa Fe Public Schools in 1994. A lawyer named Michael Gross stated that the Santa Fe Public Schools community saw her tenure there negatively. She married twice, with Chris Lyle being her second husband. Lyle was unable to obtain employment in Santa Fe.

== Dallas Independent School District ==
She became a deputy superintendent in Dallas ISD on April 1, 1996. On her request, DISD hired Lyle in the security department. On January 9, 1997, she became the first DISD superintendent of Hispanic or Latino heritage and the first woman in the same position. Eduardo Paz of D Magazine stated that Hispanic and Latino DISD residents, who wanted more political representation in the district, praised her appointment to the position. According to Skip Hollandsworth of Texas Monthly, there was racial animosity on the board, so she was chosen as white and Hispanic trustees could use her to appease Hispanics and to politically oppose black trustees, the latter of whom boycotted the vote that selected her.

She was 5 feet (1.5 m) tall and was, as described by Scott Parks of The Dallas Morning News, a "bundle of energy", so she had the nickname "Tiny Tornado". She launched a corruption probe which targeted school staff and accused critics of using the "race card" when they accused her of focusing too much on African-Americans. During her tenure Matthew Harden, the district's chief financial officer, filed a sexual harassment lawsuit against her, and the conflict became racially partisan, with black people supporting Harden and others supporting Gonzalez.

Her tenure as superintendent ended on September 17, 1997; she had resigned the previous day.

== Criminal charges, conviction, penalty, and post-career ==
She improperly used money from DISD to acquire furniture for herself, spending $16,000 of it and putting the goods in her house and her office. She was convicted in a federal court, and lost her educational credentials. She was under correctional supervision for one year and three months, from about January 1998 to April 1999; the initial months were served in federal prison and the final three were in a halfway house in San Antonio, Texas. After her prison term she worked at Dixie Flag Manufacturing Co.; in 2006 she no longer was employed there. A 2012 The Dallas Morning News article stated that the last place of employment of Gonzalez that the publication was aware of was a nonprofit immigration reform organization based in Biloxi, Mississippi, and an employee indicated she resided in Mississippi.

Educational offices
Preceded by Chad Woolery	Dallas Independent School District superintendent 1997	Succeeded by James H. Hughey
Preceded by ????	Santa Fe Public Schools superintendent 1994-1996	Succeeded by ?????
Preceded by Frank Petruzielo	Houston Independent School District superintendent (interim); 1994	Succeeded by Rod Paige
