= Deerfield Beach Elementary School =

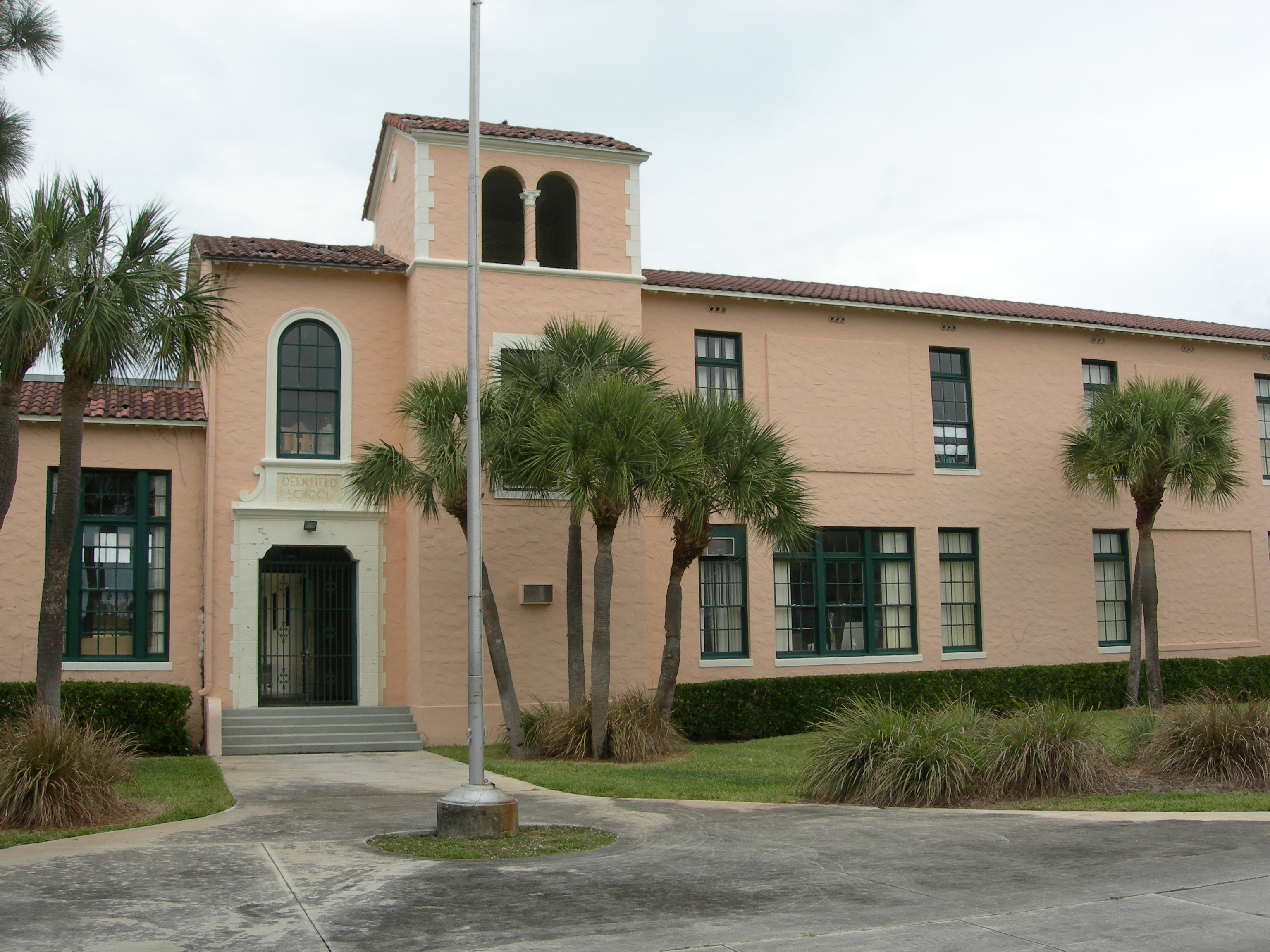

Location
- 650 NE 1st St; Deerfield Beach, Florida 33441; United States

Information
- School type: Public, Elementary school
- Opened: 1927
- School district: Broward County Public Schools
- NCES District ID: 1200180
- Superintendent: Dr. Peter B. Licata
- School number: 0011
- NCES School ID: 120018000141
- Principal: Drew Gerlach
- Grades: K–5
- Website: www.browardschools.com/deerfieldbeachelem
- Deerfield Beach Elementary School
- U.S. National Register of Historic Places
- Coordinates: 26°19′11″N 80°05′43″W
- Architect: Thomas D. McLaughlin
- NRHP reference No.: 90000319
- Added to NRHP: 16 April 1990

The Deerfield Beach Elementary School is a historic school in Deerfield Beach, Florida. It is located at 651 Northeast 1st Street and is in the Broward County Public Schools school district. On April 16, 1990, it was added to the United States National Register of Historic Places.

== Building ==
Designed by the architectural firm Thomas D. McLaughlin and Associates, and situated on land bought in 1925 by the Broward County Board of Public Instruction for $21,000 the school was built in 1926 and 1927 by the Alfred W. Kimmel Company of Pompano Beach for a cost of $55,000.

== History ==
Despite being one of the country's oldest schools, the school's facilities are still in use. The first Old Deerfield School is also listed on the National Register of Historic Places. The property for the school was obtained by the Broward County Board of Public Instruction in an exchange with the city of Deerfield Beach for the old school property.
