= CGHS =

CGHS may refer to:

- Central Government Health Scheme
- Cooperative Group Housing Society
- CGHS model
- Schools in:

Bangladesh

- Chittagong Government High School

India

- Calcutta Girls' High School

New Zealand

- Christchurch Girls' High School

Taiwan (Republic of China)

- Cheng Kung Senior High School (Taipei)

United States

- Cottage Grove High School in Cottage Grove, Oregon
- Center Grove High School in Greenwood, Indiana
- Coral Glades High School in Coral Springs, Florida
- Cardinal Gibbons High School (Fort Lauderdale, Florida)
- Cardinal Gibbons High School (Raleigh, North Carolina)
- Coral Gables Senior High School in Coral Gables, Florida (Miami area)
