= Monarch High School (Florida) =

Public high school in Coconut Creek, Florida, United States

Location
- 5050 Wiles Road; Coconut Creek, Florida 33073; 26°17′05″N 80°11′35″W

Information
- Type: Public high school
- Motto: "Home of the Knights"
- Opened: August 25, 2003
- School district: Broward County Public Schools
- NCES District ID: 1200180
- Superintendent: Dr. Peter B. Licata
- CEEB code: 100328
- NCES School ID: 120018004050
- Principal: James Cecil
- Staff: 94.00 (FTE)
- Grades: 9–12
- Student to teacher ratio: 25.28
- Colors: Black, red, and silver
- Mascot: Knight
- Information: (754) 321–1400
- Website: monarch.browardschools.com

Monarch High School (MHS) is a public high school located in Coconut Creek, Florida, United States. Monarch is part of Broward County Public Schools and serves neighborhoods in Coconut Creek, Deerfield Beach, Margate, and Pompano Beach.

Monarch had an FCAT school grade of "B" for the 2018–2019 and 2021–2022 academic years.

== Campus ==
The pair of buildings that make up the school were designed by the Miami architectural firm Zyscovitch on a design and build basis. Building 4 houses the gym, cafeteria, and numerous classrooms, and has the ability to be utilized as a hurricane shelter if necessary. The campus is also designed to enable community use of the facilities when not being used by the school.

During the school's third academic year, an additional building, Building 5, was constructed to relieve "critical overcrowding" and meet class size requirements. The school also has a number of portable classrooms. Currently MHS is trying to raise funds to build a football stadium on campus.

Monarch Highschool

== Excalibur Program ==
Monarch High School offers the Excalibur Program, an integrated and accelerated curriculum for talented students at Monarch. The program offers a rigorous curriculum consisting of high caliber classes, including those of the Honors, AICE, and AP level. Throughout the students' participation in the program, their inclusion depends upon GPA and test scores.

== Academics ==
The school's core academics include math, social studies, science, and English. Clubs and activities at the school include Drama Club, a variety of sports, a marching band, jazz band, concert band, drumline, indoor percussion, color guard, chamber orchestra, full orchestra, Debate Team, chorus, arts, Dance Team, cheerleading, foreign language clubs, journalism club, flag football, multicultural society, an Environmental Club, Mu Alpha Theta, DECA, National Honor Society (NHS) and JROTC. Advanced Placement classes are offered also.

Monarch students attend school from 7:40 AM to 2:40 PM, Monday through Friday on Block schedule. The current schedule requires students to attend four classes out of eight each day and a 30-minute lunch period each day with an five-minute passing period between each class.

2015 Academic Indicators

- College Readiness Index 22.6
- Mathematics Proficiency 2.7
- Reading Proficiency 2.8
- Student-Teacher Ratio 24:1

=== Sports ===
Boy's Varsity	JV	Girl's Varsity	JV
Baseball	Yes	Softball	Yes
Basketball	Yes	Basketball	Yes
Cross Country	No	Cross Country	No
Football	Yes	Flag Football	Yes
Golf	No	Golf	No
Soccer	No	Soccer	No
Swimming	No	Swimming	No
Tennis	No	Tennis	No
Track and Field	No	Track and Field	No
Volleyball	No	Volleyball	Yes
Water Polo	No	Water Polo	No
Wrestling	Yes		

=== Test scores ===
U.S. News calculates these values based on student performance on state exit exams and internationally available exams on college-level course work (AP/IB exams).

Proficient in Reading	56%
Proficient in Mathematics	55%
College Readiness Index	22.6

=== Subject Proficiency Testing ===
Student exit exams receive grades among multiple proficiency levels established by the state. These figures display how the school as a whole performed in different subjects.

Discipline	School	District	State	Mathematics	2.7	2.6	2.6
Reading	2.8	2.5	2.5				

=== Reading Proficiency Distribution ===
Reading proficiency is determined by student results on the school's Florida Comprehensive Assessment Test or End-of-Course Assessments.

Below Basic	13%
Basic	31%
Proficient-Level 3	27%
Advanced-Level 4	23%
Advanced-Level 5	7%

=== Mathematics Proficiency Distribution ===
Mathematics proficiency is determined by student results on the school's Florida Comprehensive Assessment Test or End-of-Course Assessments tests.

Below Basic	15%
Basic	31%
Proficient-Level 3	35%
Advanced-Level 4	16%
Advanced-Level 5	4%

=== Overall Student Performance ===
This measures overall student performance on state exams. The calculations by U.S. News were the first of two steps in determining which schools received at least a bronze medal.

State Test Performance Index	85.4
Gap Between Actual and Expected Performance Index	2.4

=== Disadvantaged Student Performance ===
This measures the proficiency on state exams among typically underperforming subgroups. The calculations by U.S. News were the second of two steps in determining which schools received at least a bronze medal.

Percentage of Disadvantaged Students Who Are Proficient	49.4%
Percentage of Non-Disadvantaged Students Who Are Proficient	58.8%
Gap Between Disadvantaged and Non-Disadvantaged Students	-9.4
Gap Between School and State Among Disadvantaged Students	5.7

=== College-Ready Student Performance ===
High school students take AP and IB exams to earn college credit and demonstrate success at college-level course work. U.S. News calculated a College Readiness Index based on exam participation rates and percentages of students passing at least one exam. The index determined which types of medals (gold, silver or bronze) were awarded to top-performing schools.

College Readiness Index	22.6
Exam Used for Index	AP

=== Advanced Placement (AP) Student Performance ===
Many U.S. higher educational institutions grant credits or advanced placement based on student performance on AP exams. This shows this school's student participation and performance on these exams if data were available.

Participation Rate	36%
Participant Passing Rate	51%
Exams Per Test Taker	3.7
Exam Pass Rate	30%
Quality-Adjusted Participation Rate	18%
Quality-Adjusted Exams Per Test Passer	1.1

Data are based on the 2012-2013 school year.

== Student body ==
=== Class ===
These details on the school's student body are based on data reported to the government.

Total enrollment	2,255
9th grade	574 students
10th grade	610 students
11th grade	543 students
12th grade	528 students

== Demographics ==
As of the 2021–22 school year, the total student enrollment was 2,406. The ethnic makeup of the school was 67.3% White, 23.9% Black, 40.1% Hispanic, 3.9% Asian, 3.5% Multiracial, 1% Native American or Native Alaskan, and 0.4% Native Hawaiian or Pacific Islander. 53.1% of the students were eligible for free or reduced cost lunch.

== Digital Learning Environment ==
At the beginning of the Digital Learning Environment program, in the school's second academic year (2004–2005), students were provided with a laptop that could be taken home and brought back with them to school on a regular basis to further enhance the program. This element was withdrawn after three years because of budget cuts, the expense of computer repairs and maintenance and because of misuse, vandalism and stolen/ lost computers.

== Pinwheels for Peace ==
A program started by two teachers, Ellen McMillan and Ann Ayers at Monarch High, the Pinwheels for Peace Project invites students to create and display their pinwheels on the campus during the International Day of Peace and has been adopted internationally. Groups in more than 1,500 places have planted more than half a million pinwheels throughout the world.

== Traditions ==
=== Knights Code of Chivalry ===
The school emphasizes a code of conduct among students, teachers, faculty and peers dubbed the "Knights Code of Chivalry." The code was created by a student panel the year before the school opened. Plaques containing the code are present in every classroom.

- Responsibility
- Citizenship
- Kindness
- Respect
- Honesty
- Self-Control
- Tolerance
- Cooperation

== Controversy ==
In 2023, the school came under investigation by the state of Florida after the state discovered that one of the players on the school's girls' volleyball team was transgender. For the duration of the investigation, the principal, assistant principal, and coach have all been reassigned pending completion of the school district's investigation. In a statement to the Washington Post, the coach said that he'd had no idea that the girl in question was in fact transgender. A spokesperson for the DeSantis administration called the student's participation "a direct violation of Florida law" and that there would be "serious consequences for those responsible." By June 2024, according to the girl's mother, she'd gone from being the freshman and sophomore class president, homecoming princess, and student body director of philanthropy, to leaving Monarch entirely and attending school online.
