= Broward Virtual Education High =

Broward Virtual School

Location
- 1400 NW 43rd Avenue; Coconut Creek, FL 33066, U.S.
- 26°14′47″N 80°10′58″W

Information
- Type: Public school
- Motto: "BVS provides students with an authentic and meaningful online learning experience. Proudly serving Broward County students since 2001. "
- School district: Broward County Public Schools
- Superintendent: Dr. Peter B. Licata
- Principal: Christopher P. McGuire
- Faculty: 75
- Grades: K -12
- Enrollment: 400 full-time / 13,000 part-time
- Colors: Red, black, and white
- Mascot: Trailblazers
- Website: Broward Virtual School

Broward Virtual School (BVS) offers full-time and part-time enrollment to students in grades K-12 through an online educational delivery system. Home educated students in grades 6-12 may enroll part-time as well. BVS offers students the opportunity to earn a standard high school diploma entirely online. BVS has been designated an "A" school by the Florida Department of Education.

Broward Virtual School is a franchise partner of Florida Virtual School for middle and high school curriculum. BVS is among the top performing Florida Virtual School franchise in Florida. BVS partners with K12 Inc. for its elementary school program. As a component of The School Board of Broward County, Broward Virtual School is fully accredited by the Southern Association of Colleges and Schools (SACS) and Commission on International and Trans-Regional Accreditation (CITA). The BVS administrative office is located in Coconut Creek, Florida inside Coconut Creek High School. BVS operates under the provisions of Florida Statutes 1002.37 and 1002.455.

== Extracurricular activities for full-time students ==
- Broward Teen News Internships
- National Honor Society
- National Junior Honor Society
- Key Club
- Florida Future Educators of America
- Student talent show
- Field trips
- Academic competitions
- College planning seminars
- Junior and Senior prom

== Notable alumni ==
- Jazz Jennings (Class of 2019, transgender rights advocate)
- Lexi Thompson (Class of 2012, Ladies Professional Golf Association Member)
- Naomi Osaka (Ladies professional tennis player)

== Demographics ==
As of 2011, the total student enrollment was 459. The ethnic makeup of the school was 63% White, 9% Black, 20% Hispanic, 3% Asian or Pacific Islander, 3% Multiracial, and 1% Native American or Native Alaskan.
