= Lauderdale-by-the-Sea, Florida =

Town in Florida, United States

Lauderdale-by-the-Sea
- Town
- Town of Lauderdale-by-the-Sea
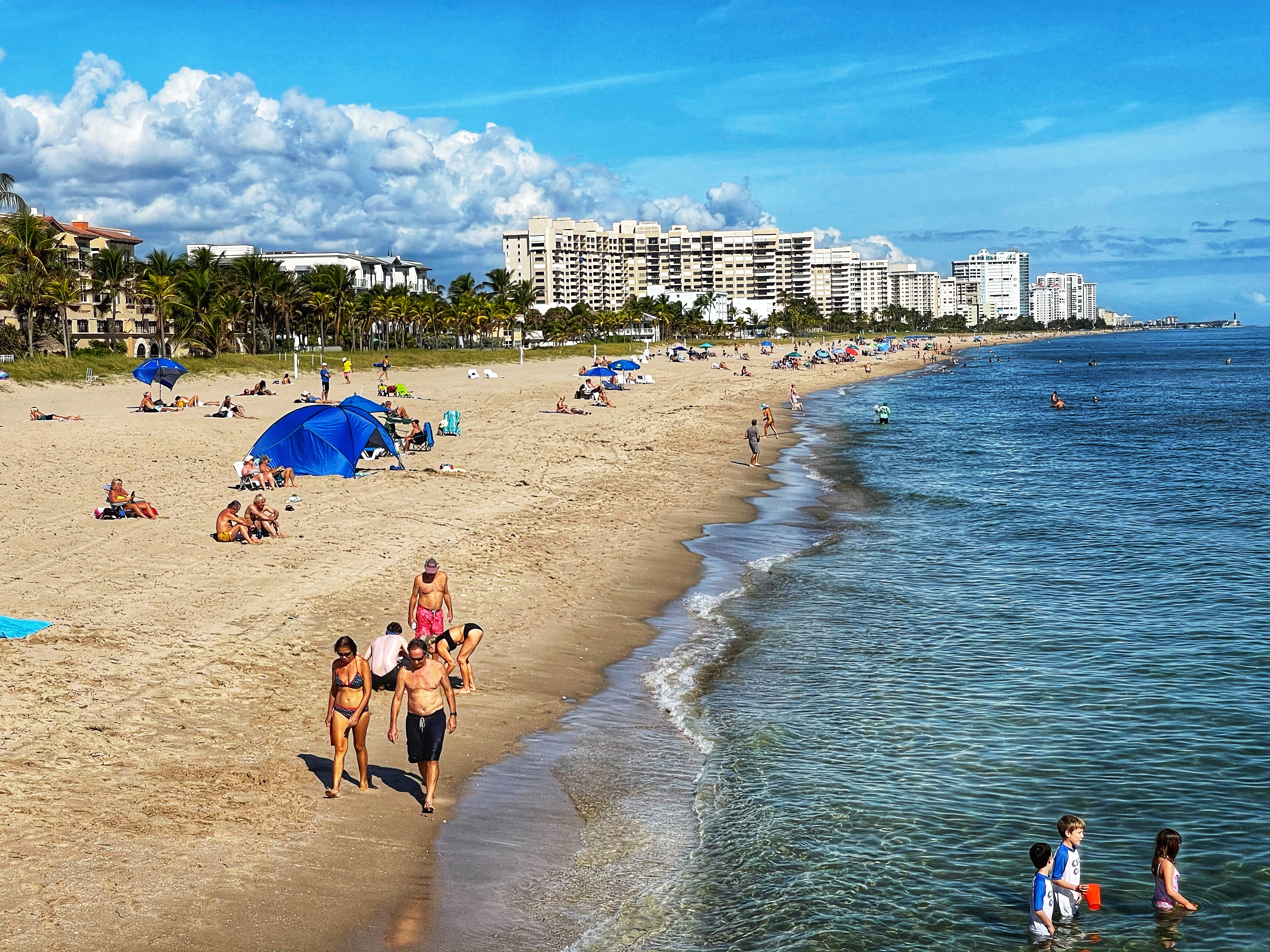
- The beach is the main visitor attraction of Lauderdale-by-the-Sea

- Seal
- Nickname: LBTS
- Location of Lauderdale-by-the-Sea in Broward County, Florida
- Coordinates: 26°11′23″N 80°06′01″W
- Country: United States
- State: Florida
- County: Broward
- Settled: c. 1920s–1924
- Incorporated: November 30, 1927
- Reincorporated: November 30, 1947

Government
  - Type: Commission-Manager

Area
  - Total: 0.94 sq mi (2.43 km^{2})
  - Land: 0.88 sq mi (2.27 km^{2})
  - Water: 0.062 sq mi (0.16 km^{2}) 44.2%
- Elevation: 7 ft (2.1 m)

Population (2020)
  - Total: 6,198
  - Density: 7,069.2/sq mi (2,729.44/km^{2})
- Time zone: UTC-5 (EST)
  - Summer (DST): UTC-4 (EDT)
- ZIP code: 33308, 33062
- Area codes: 954, 754
- FIPS code: 12-39475
- GNIS feature ID: 2405991
- Website: http://www.lauderdalebythesea-fl.gov/

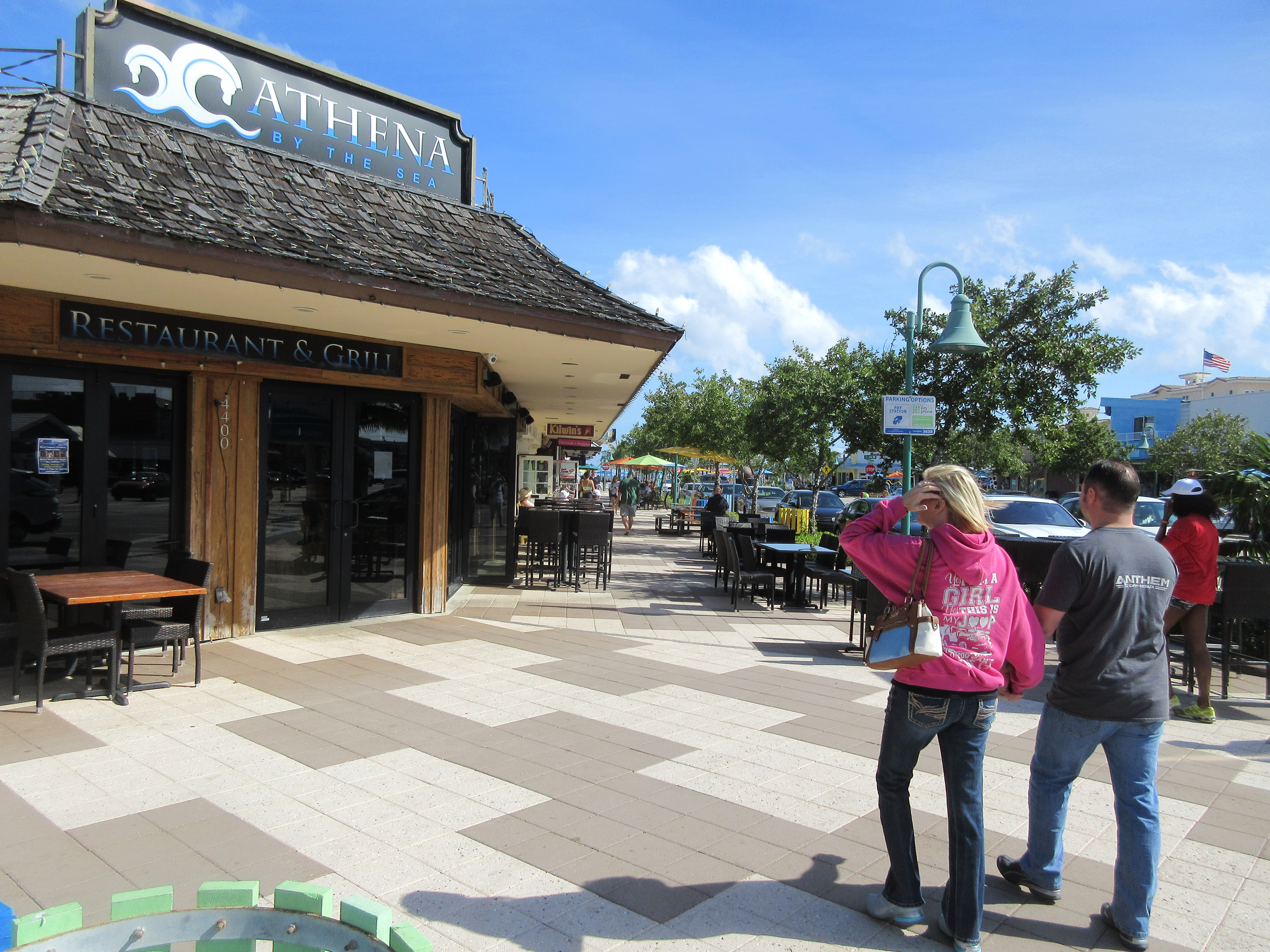
Shops and restaurants around the intersection of Commercial Boulevard and A1A in Lauderdale-by-the-Sea

Lauderdale-by-the-Sea is a town in Broward County, Florida, United States, situated 33 miles north of Miami. The town is part of the South Florida metropolitan area. As of the 2020 census, the population was 6,198.

== Geography ==
According to the United States Census Bureau, the town has a total area of 1.57 square miles (4 km^{2}), of which 0.876 square miles (2 km^{2}) is land and 0.694 square miles (2 km^{2}) (44.2%) is water.

The southern half of Lauderdale-by-the-Sea is situated between Fort Lauderdale and the Village of Sea Ranch Lakes, Florida. The Town's northern municipal neighbor is Pompano Beach. The entire town is located on a long, narrow barrier island separated from the mainland by the Intracoastal Waterway (spanned by one drawbridge at Commercial Boulevard), stretching approximately one-half dozen blocks to the Atlantic Ocean. The town is centered on the junction of State Road A1A and Commercial Boulevard. The main industry is tourism; the town has many hotels and motels used by visitors, especially during the winter; many of its older hotels and buildings reflect mid-century modern architecture design [MiMo]. Recognized by the Florida Legislature in 2016 for its near-shore coral reefs and efforts to promote scuba diving, the town is known as Florida's Beach Diving Capital. With a coral reef just 100 yards offshore, the town is a popular spot for scuba divers, especially just south of Anglin's Pier.

On the ocean at the east end of Commercial Boulevard is Anglin's Fishing Pier, named after Lauderdale-by-the-Sea's first mayor, Melvin I. Anglin. The town is home to SS Copenhagen, a 19th-century British steamship that wrecked in 25 feet of water in May 1900 after striking a coral reef. The historic site is a Florida archaeological underwater preserve and is listed on the National Register of Historic Places. The town doubled in size in 2001 when it annexed the unincorporated Intracoastal Beach Area to the north. The area included the neighborhoods of Bel Air and Terra Mar Island. Even though the town's permanent population is 6,056, it nearly doubles when snowbirds and tourists come here to spend the winter. The Town underwent a major transformation in 2013, when it completed a streetscape project between the Commercial Boulevard Bridge and the ocean. Sidewalks were widened and enhanced with brick pavers as well as landscaping.

Two new public plazas were added in Anglin's Square and furnished with colorful "Addy" chairs, boat benches and bike racks shaped like fish. Each of the four business plazas on Commercial were outfitted with coral reef themed artworks (parrotfish, green turtle, eagle ray and sea fan), reflecting the town's ties with the ocean. An 18-foot coral reef sculpture also greets visitors as they enter the town over the intracoastal waterway.

== Demographics ==
Historical population
Census	Pop.	Note	%±
1950	234		—
1960	1,327		467.1%
1970	2,879		117.0%
1980	2,639		−8.3%
1990	2,990		13.3%
2000	2,563		−14.3%
2010	6,056		136.3%
2020	6,198		2.3%
U.S. Decennial Census

=== 2020 census ===
As of the 2020 census, Lauderdale-by-the-Sea had a population of 6,198. The median age was 62.7 years. 6.2% of residents were under the age of 18 and 44.3% of residents were 65 years of age or older. For every 100 females there were 97.8 males, and for every 100 females age 18 and over there were 98.1 males age 18 and over.

100.0% of residents lived in urban areas, while 0.0% lived in rural areas.

There were 3,626 households in Lauderdale-by-the-Sea, of which 7.4% had children under the age of 18 living in them. Of all households, 39.2% were married-couple households, 25.2% were households with a male householder and no spouse or partner present, and 29.6% were households with a female householder and no spouse or partner present. About 46.2% of all households were made up of individuals and 24.4% had someone living alone who was 65 years of age or older.

There were 6,770 housing units, of which 46.4% were vacant. The homeowner vacancy rate was 2.1% and the rental vacancy rate was 13.1%.

Lauderdale-by-the-Sea racial composition (Hispanics excluded from racial categories) (NH = Non-Hispanic)
Race	Number	Percentage
White (NH)	5,081	81.98%
Black or African American (NH)	86	1.39%
Native American or Alaska Native (NH)	2	0.03%
Asian (NH)	90	1.45%
Pacific Islander or Native Hawaiian (NH)	6	0.10%
Some other race (NH)	41	0.66%
Two or more races/Multiracial (NH)	202	3.26%
Hispanic or Latino (any race)	690	11.13%
Total	6,198	100.00%

=== Demographic estimates ===
The 2020 American Community Survey 5-year estimates reported 1,725 families residing in the town.

=== 2010 census ===
Lauderdale-by-the-Sea Demographics
2010 Census	Lauderdale-by-the-Sea	Broward County	Florida
Total population	6,056	1,748,066	18,801,310
Population, percent change, 2000 to 2010	+136.3%	+7.7%	+17.6%
Population density	6,916.1/sq mi	1,444.9/sq mi	350.6/sq mi
White or Caucasian (including White Hispanic)	96.3%	63.1%	75.0%
(Non-Hispanic White or Caucasian)	88.2%	43.5%	57.9%
Black or African-American	1.2%	26.7%	16.0%
Hispanic or Latino (of any race)	8.8%	25.1%	22.5%
Asian	0.8%	3.2%	2.4%
Native American or Native Alaskan	0.1%	0.3%	0.4%
Pacific Islander or Native Hawaiian	0.0%	0.1%	0.1%
Two or more races (Multiracial)	0.9%	2.9%	2.5%
Some Other Race	0.7%	3.7%	3.6%

As of the 2010 United States census, there were 6,056 people, 3,661 households, and 1,698 families residing in the town.

== Media ==
Lauderdale-by-the-Sea is a part of the Miami-Fort Lauderdale-Hollywood media market, which is the twelfth largest radio market and the seventeenth largest television market in the United States. Its primary daily newspapers are the South Florida Sun-Sentinel and The Miami Herald. There are currently no newspapers based in Lauderdale-by-the-Sea, although the neighboring weekly, The Pompano Pelican regularly covers the community.

== Education ==
Broward County Public Schools operates public schools. Zoned schools include:

- Elementary schools: McNab and Bayview
- Middle schools: Pompano Beach and Sunrise
- High schools: Fort Lauderdale, Northeast, and Blanche Ely

In addition the community is in the service area of the magnet school Pompano Beach High School.
