= Northeast High School (Oakland Park, Florida) =

High school in Oakland Park, Florida, United States

Location
- 700 Northeast 56th Street; 700 Jett Boulevard; Oakland Park, Florida 33334; United States; 26°11′42″N 80°08′15″W

Information
- Type: Zoned and Magnet Public Secondary
- Motto: Home of the Hurricanes
- School district: Broward County Public Schools
- Superintendent: Dr. Peter B. Licata
- Principal: Anthony Valachovic
- Staff: 72.00 (FTE)
- Grades: 9 to 12
- Enrollment: 1,589 (2023–2024)
- Student to teacher ratio: 22.07
- Colors: Red, White and Black
- Athletics: 6A
- Athletics conference: District 10
- Mascot: Hurricane
- Website: northeast.browardschools.com

Northeast High School is a public high school in Oakland Park, Florida, United States. The school is a part of the Broward County Public Schools district. It serves much of Oakland Park, Sea Ranch Lakes, a portion of Lauderdale-by-the-Sea, sections of Fort Lauderdale, a portion of Tamarac, and a portion of North Lauderdale east of Florida's Turnpike.

== Demographics ==
As of the 2021–22 school year, the total student enrollment was 1,587. The ethnic makeup of the school was 18.9% White, 43.9% Hispanic, 33.6% Black, 1.3% Asian, 2.5% Multiracial, 0.8% Native American or Native Alaskan, and 0.1% Native Hawaiian or Pacific Islander.

== FCAT scores ==
Northeast High has received FCAT school grades of:

- "A" - 2009–2010 academic year
- "A" - 2008–2009 academic year
- "A" - 2007–2008 academic year
- "A" - 2006–2007 academic year
- "A" - 2005–2006 academic year
- "A" - 2004–2005 academic year
- "A" - 2003–2004 academic year
- "A" - 2002–2003 academic year

== Awards ==
In February 2007, Dr. Sandy Melillo, an English and TV production teacher at Northeast, was named Broward County's 2008 Teacher of the Year and state finalist. She moved to Pompano Beach High School in 2009 and retired in 2021 after 48 years of teaching high school. She is now an adjunct English professor at Broward College.

In 2007, Northeast was awarded a GOLDEN SCHOOL AWARD from the State of Florida Commissioner of Education Jeanine Blomberg. This award was given in recognition of the leadership and support rendered to the school volunteer program.

== Notable alumni ==
- Briana Williams - 2020 Tokyo Olympics Gold Medalist - Track & Field
- Mike Mularkey - former NFL player and coach
- Stacy Coley - former NFL wide receiver
- Jaco Pastorius - jazz bassist and composer
- Brent Jett - astronaut
- Margaret Whitton - film and television actor
- Derrick Roberson - former NFL cornerback
- Brian Drahman - former professional baseball player (Chicago White Sox, Florida Marlins)
- Walter Salas-Humara and Bob Rupe - co-founded the rock band The Silos
- Grantis Bell - former professional football player (Detroit Drive, Massachusetts Marauders, Orlando Thunder, Tampa Bay Storm. Currently an NFL referee.

== Clubs ==
Northeast High School has a myriad of clubs such as:

- Anime Club
- Art
- Band
- Jazz Band
- Drama
- Ecology Club
- First Priority
- Human Relations Council
- Humane Society
- AFJROTC
- Key Club
- Latin Club
- National Honor Society
- Mu Alpha Theta
- SECME: Science, Engineering, Communication, Mathematics Enrichment
- Junior Academy of Science
- Robotics club
- Newspaper
- Yearbook
- Debate
- Esports
- Dungeons and Dragons
- United Notes Club

== Air Force Junior ROTC ==
In 1991, Northeast High School's Air Force JROTC unit, Florida-822, won first place overall at the Florida State Drill Team & Color Guard meet hosted at Patrick Air Force Base led by Cadet Colonel Kevin Croyle (Drill Team Commander) and Cadet Captain John Osorio (Color Guard Commander). Earlier in the same school year, Florida-822 won its first ever first place overall by winning the Lake Worth High School Regional Drill Meet. To finish out the school year the unit went to its first ever national drill meet. The drill team and color guard finished in the top five units in the country of over thirty schools participating.

Other Notable Events:

- 1989 - Eunice Taylor became the first female corp commander.
- 1991 - Frantz Petitpapa became the first African American corp commander.
- 2008 - The Northeast Drill Team won second place in the Eastern Division National Drill Meet hosted by the Air Force Association in Macon, Georgia.

== Athletics ==
Northeast High School participates in the following sports:

- Baseball: Class 4A State Semi-finalist (1994)
- Basketball: Boys Class 3A State Runners-up (1985)
- Girls Basketball: Girls Class 6A State Runners-up (2016)
- Girls JV Basketball
- Cross Country
- Football - Current head coach is Nick Dellaria
- Golf
- Soccer
- Girls Soccer
- Softball
- Swimming: Girls Class 4A State Champions (1976)
- Tennis
- Track: Girls Class 3A State Champions (1984), Girls Class 3A 3rd place (2019)
- Volleyball: Boys State Runners-up (2004)
- Water Polo: Boys State Champions (2005, 2006)
- Wrestling
