= Bayview Elementary School =

Bayview Elementary School may refer to:

- Bayview Elementary School (Saint John, New Brunswick), Canada
- Bayview Elementary School (Vancouver, British Columbia), Canada
- bayview elementary school Midland ontario Canada
- Bayview Elementary School (Fort Lauderdale, Florida), United States
