= Greg Romeus =

American football player (born 1988)

No. 91
- Position: Linebacker

Personal information
- Born: April 29, 1988 (age 38); Coral Springs, Florida, U.S.
- Listed height: 6 ft 5 in (1.96 m)
- Listed weight: 267 lb (121 kg)

Career information
- High school: Coral Glades (Coral Springs)
- College: Pittsburgh
- NFL draft: 2011: 7th round, 226th overall pick

Career history
- New Orleans Saints (2011–2012); Toronto Argonauts (2014); Boston Brawlers (2014)

Awards and highlights
- Third-team All-American (2009); Freshman All-American (2007); Big East co-Defensive Player of the Year (2009); First-team All-Big East (2009); Second-team All-Big East (2008); 2014 FXFL All-Star
- Stats at Pro Football Reference

Greg Romeus (born April 29, 1988) is an American former football player. He was selected by the New Orleans Saints in the seventh round of the 2011 NFL draft. He played college football as a defensive end for the Pittsburgh Panthers. Romeus played football for just one year before entering college. During high school, he was considered a top college prospect in basketball.

== Early life ==
Romeus was born on April 29, 1988, in Coral Springs, Florida, to parents Sadrac and Fanie Romeus. He attended Coral Glades High School. He played basketball there and was considered a top college prospect. He played his only season of high school football during his senior year as a defensive end and wide receiver He recorded five receptions for 54 yards and one touchdown. Romeus was named the team's most valuable player and selected for the Broward County All-Star Game.

== College career ==
Romeus enrolled at the University of Pittsburgh where he is studying sociology. He sat out the 2006 season as on redshirt status. In 2007, he saw action in all 12 games and recorded 41 tackles. He ranked second on the team in tackles for loss with 11.5 and tied for second with four quarterback sacks. In an upset win in the Backyard Brawl rivalry game against West Virginia, he compiled four tackles and recovered one fumble. Romeus also recorded a sack against Pat White for a seven-yard loss on third down, which prevented a West Virginia comeback bid. That season, he was named a College Football News, Football Writers Association of America (FWAA), The Sporting News, Rivals.com, and Scout.com freshman All-American.

In 2008, he recorded 51 tackles, including 26 solo, 15.5 tackles for loss, and 7.5 sacks. Romeus was named to the Second-team All-Big East Conference. He was also named a Rivals.com Second-team All-Big East, Phil Steele's Second-team All-Big East, and College Football News First-team All-Big East. ESPN named him the eighth-best player in the Big East Conference.

He was selected as the Big East Co-Defensive Player of the Year along with teammate Mick Williams in 2009. He finished the regular season playing 12 games making 40 tackles (10.5 for losses) and 8 sacks. He also intercepted a pass, forced 2 fumbles, recovered one, broke up four passes, had 11 hurries and blocked a kick.

In April 2010, Romeus was placed on the watch list for the upcoming season's Lott Trophy awarded to country's top defensive player. Heading into the 2010 season, Romeus was also listed by the Sporting News as a second-team preseason All-American.

== Professional career ==
=== Pre-draft ===
Pre-draft measurables
Height	Weight	Arm length	Hand span	Wingspan	Bench press
6 ft 4 7/8 in (1.95 m)	264 lb (120 kg)	35 in (0.89 m)	10 7/8 in (0.28 m)	6 ft 10 in (2.08 m)	24 reps
All values from NFL Combine/Pro Day

Outside of getting his basic measurements – height (6'5"), weight (264 lbs), arms (35"), and hands (10 7/8") – Romeus didn't participate in any of the other activities at the NFL Combine due to back and knee injuries.

=== New Orleans Saints ===
In the 2011 NFL draft, Romeus was selected in the seventh round with the 226th overall pick by the New Orleans Saints. Having been injured in college, he spent his rookie season on the injured reserve list. Romeus was again injured before the start of the 2012 NFL season, and after he cleared waivers, the Saints placed him on the injured reserve list on June 25, 2012. The New Orleans Saints released him on May 23, 2013.

=== Toronto Argonauts ===
Romeus was signed by the Toronto Argonauts on May 21, 2014. He was released by the Argonauts on July 24, 2014.
