= Camp Aranu'tiq =

Camp for transgender youth

Camp Aranu'tiq is a sleepaway camp for transgender children. It is operated by Harbor Camps, Inc., a nonprofit organization that runs camps for children and youth from marginalized populations, including those with dwarfism and craniofacial abnormalities. The camp is located in New Hampshire.

== History ==
Camp Aranu'tiq was founded in 2009 by Nick Teich, a transgender man who had been asked to stop working at a sleepaway camp as a result of his transition. He realized that transgender children would go through the same issue of being kept out of gender-segregated spaces and thought that they should have a place where they felt completely comfortable.

The name "Aranu'tiq" is a Chugach word for people who were thought to embody both a female and male spirit, also known as two-spirit. In that culture, Aranu'tiq people were considered lucky.

In 2015, Caitlyn Jenner visited and blogged about the camp, which was featured on an episode of her reality show, I Am Cait.

== Notable campers ==
- Jazz Jennings, activist
- Nicole Maines, actress
