= Elmhurst Community Unit School District 205 =

School district in Elmhurst, Illinois, United States

Address
- 162 South York Street Elmhurst, Illinois, 60126; United States

District information
- Type: Public
- Motto: Educate, Engage, Empower.
- Grades: PreK–12
- Superintendent: Keisha Campbell
- NCES District ID: 1713970

Students and staff
- Students: 8,240
- Colors: dark blue

Other information
- Website: www.elmhurst205.org

Elmhurst Community Unit School District 205 (D205) is a school district headquartered in Elmhurst, Illinois in the Chicago metropolitan area. It serves most of Elmhurst, as well as small parts of Addison, Oakbrook, and Bensenville.

== History ==
The first school serving the Elmhurst area was the Churchville Schoolhouse in modern Bensenville. The schoolhouse was built by local farmers and craftsman circa 1850, and was used until 1930. The school was attended by students from Bensenville, Addison, and Elmhurst.

In 1995 a school bond of $15 million was proposed. In 1993 the district had 6,173 students, and Emerson School had rented church facilities for excess students.

== Build D205 ==
In November 2018 a $168.5 million referendum was passed to make improvements to District buildings. The referendum included safety and security improvements, as well as other general improvements, and providing space for all day kindergarten

The district has already completed creating Media centers from libraries at Edison, Emerson, Fischer, Jackson, and Bryan schools, HVAC improvements at Edison, Fischer, Jackson, Jefferson, York, Bryan, and Sandburg schools. The district has also improved safety at many schools and made other site improvements like improved play and sports spaces, as well as improved parking lots

The district is currently working on improvements to stage and orchestra facilities at York, and is also working on improving Churchville and Hawthorne schools.

The district has future plans to completely renovate Madison Early Childhood center.

== Board of Education ==
Board of Education Members
Name	Role	Elected
Athena Arvanitis	President	April 2021
Beth Hosler	Vice President	April 2023
Courtenae Trautmann	Secretary	April 2023
Kara Caforio	Member	April 2021
Jim Collins	Member	April 2021
Kelly Asseff	Member	April 2023
Kelly Henry	Member	April 2023

Board members are elected every 4 years in April. The Board is responsible for the district's budget, policies, and keeping the district's administration accountable.

== Students ==
Students by Race
Race	Count	Percent
White	5615	68.1
Black	135	1.6
Hispanic	1538	18.7
Am. Indian	13	0.2

Students by Gender
Gender	Count	Percent
Male	4273	51.9
Female	3967	48.1

== Schools ==
Schools
Name	Address	Grades	Feeds to
York Community High School	355 W. St. Charles Road Elmhurst, IL	9-12	None
Sandburg Middle School	345 E. St. Charles Road Elmhurst, IL	6-8	York
Bryan Middle School	111 Butterfield Road Elmhurst, IL	6-8	York
Churchville Middle School	155 Victory Parkway Elmhurst, IL	6-8	York
Edison Elementary School	246 Fair Elmhurst, IL	K-5	Sandburg
Field Elementary School	295 Emroy Elmhurst, IL	K-5	Sandburg
Hawthorne Elementary School	145 Arthur Street Elmhurst, IL	K-5	Sandburg
Jackson Elementary School	925 Swain Elmhurst, IL	K-5	Bryan
Jefferson Elementary School	360 E. Crescent Elmhurst, IL	K-5	Bryan
Lincoln Elementary School	565 Fairfield Elmhurst, IL	K-5	Bryan
Emerson Elementary School	400 N. West Elmhurst, IL	K-5	Churchville
Fischer Elementary School	888 North Wilson Elmhurst, IL	K-5	Churchville
Madison Early Childhood Center	130 W. Madison Elmhurst, IL	Pre-K	All K-5

== See also ==
- Joan Raymond - Former superintendent
