= Lauderhill 6–12 STEM-MED =

Magnet school in Florida, United States

Coordinates: 26.1497°N 80.2167°W

Lauderhill 6–12 STEM-MED is a magnet school in Lauderhill, Florida that serves the sixth and twelfth grades. It is a part of Broward County Public Schools. The high school portion is the first to open in the city of Lauderhill.

It mostly serves Lauderhill, but also accepts a small portion of Lauderdale Lakes. While the high school is not automatically zoned, people in Lauderhill have priority for admission to the high school.

Lauderhill 6–12 STEM-MED typically accepts graduates of feeders schools: Castle Hill Elementary, Endeavour Primary Learning Center, Lauderhill Paul Turner Elementary, Plantation Elementary School, and Royal Palm Elementary.

== Academics ==
Academic pathways and programs at Lauderhill 6–12 STEM-MED include a code/game development program, computer science, engineering and robotics.

The school also has a Fire Academy/First Responders Program with the Lauderhill Fire Department. This is a three-year program that prepares cadets for entry into post-graduate fire academies.

Students also have the opportunity to become a Magnet Ambassador (a student leader who serves as a liaison, spokesperson, and advocate for the school). These selected students assist during new student orientation processes, give campus tours, and assist with special events.

=== Junior Achievement Experience (JA Experience) Program ===
High school students are introduced to entrepreneurship, financial literacy, and work readiness. Students participate in team projects and competitions (campus-wide, regional, and national), business boot camps, leadership retreats, and company site visits.

Freshman and sophomores explore career clusters, digital citizenship, strategic decision making, banking & savings, investing & risk management, credit management, budgeting, life planning, and personal spending.

Juniors and seniors participate in SPARK Tank Competitions, business boot camps, and national competitions creating student-managed companies.

== Demographics ==
As of the 2018–2019 school year, the total enrollment was 875 students. The ethnic makeup of the school was 94.47% Black, 4.26% Hispanic, and 1.04% White. 94.29% of students receive free/reduced lunch while only 5.71% receive full lunch.
