= Jazz Jennings =

American internet personality (born 2000)

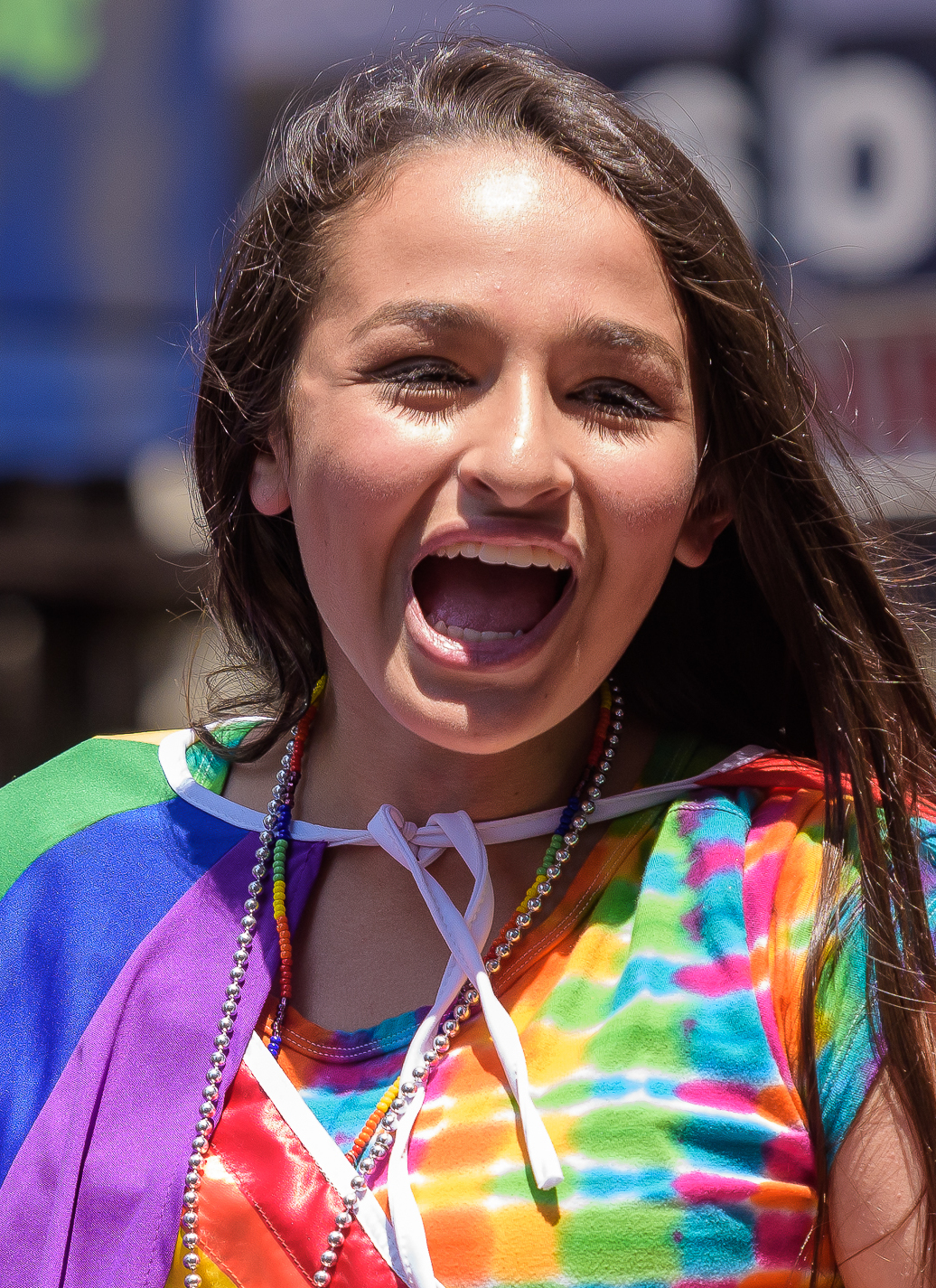
- Jazz Jennings at the New York City Pride parade in 2016
- Born: October 6, 2000 (age 25); West Palm Beach, Florida, U.S.
- Education: Harvard University (AB)
- Occupations: Media personality; LGBT activist
- Known for: Transgender activism; I Am Jazz (2015); Being Jazz (2016)

Jazz Jennings (born October 6, 2000) is an American media personality and LGBT rights activist. Jennings is one of the youngest publicly documented people to be identified as transgender. Jennings received national attention in 2007 when an interview with Barbara Walters aired on 20/20, which led to other high-profile interviews and appearances. Christine Connelly, a member of the board of directors for the Boston Alliance of Gay, Lesbian, Bisexual, and Transgender Youth, stated, "She was the first young person who picked up the national spotlight, went on TV and was able to articulate her perspective and point of view with such innocence." Her parents noted that Jennings was clear on being female as soon as she could speak.

Jennings is an honorary co-founder of the TransKids Purple Rainbow Foundation, which her parents founded in 2007 to assist transgender youth. In 2013, she founded Purple Rainbow Tails, a company in which she fashions rubber mermaid tails to raise money for transgender children. Jennings hosts a series of YouTube videos about her life, titled "I Am Jazz". She stars in the TLC reality TV series, I Am Jazz, which premiered in 2015 and focuses on her daily life with her family and the challenges she faces as a transgender person.

== Early life and education ==
Jennings was born on October 6, 2000, at St. Mary's Medical Center in West Palm Beach, Florida to Gregory and Jeanette. The youngest of four children, Jennings has an older sister named Arial and two older brothers named Sander and Griffen, who are twins. Her parents are Jewish and her father is an estate attorney.

Jennings was assigned male at birth. She began identifying as a girl when she was two years old, her mother Jeanette saying she "liked everything sparkly and pink" and describing her as "so feminine." At four years old, she became one of the youngest individuals to have been diagnosed with gender dysphoria, and, at five years old, she came out to her friends and family at her fifth birthday party. When she was six years old, Jennings came out as transgender on national television in a 2007 interview with journalist Barbara Walters on 20/20. To protect the family's privacy, they used the surname Jennings. Though her family was accepting and she was able to connect with other transgender youth through events and organizations like Camp Aranu'tiq, her transition wasn't always met with support from the public. In elementary school, she was barred from joining the girls' soccer team and was bullied.

At age 11, Jennings began to medically transition by taking puberty blockers to delay her sexual development and by 14, she had begun feminizing hormone therapy. While crediting puberty blockers with saving her life, Jennings said she struggled socially in high school, particularly romantically, because of being transgender. In early 2018, Jennings lost 30 pounds in preparation for gender-affirming surgery. She underwent surgery in June, at 17. Dr. Jess Ting said operation was unique and difficult because it was necessary to remove tissue from her lower pelvic region and upper thighs, a procedure that had only been documented in medical literature about 50 times. Jennings suffered post-surgical complications and underwent another surgery to correct them in October.

She graduated from Broward Virtual Education High, an online school, in 2019. She was valedictorian and decorated her graduation cap in a rainbow theme. She was accepted into Harvard University but decided to delay her entry for one year for mental health reasons, saying she needed time to focus on herself. During this time, she underwent surgery a third time, this time for cosmetic reasons. Jennings graduated from Harvard in 2025 with a Bachelor of Arts in Art, Film, and Visual Studies.

== Career ==
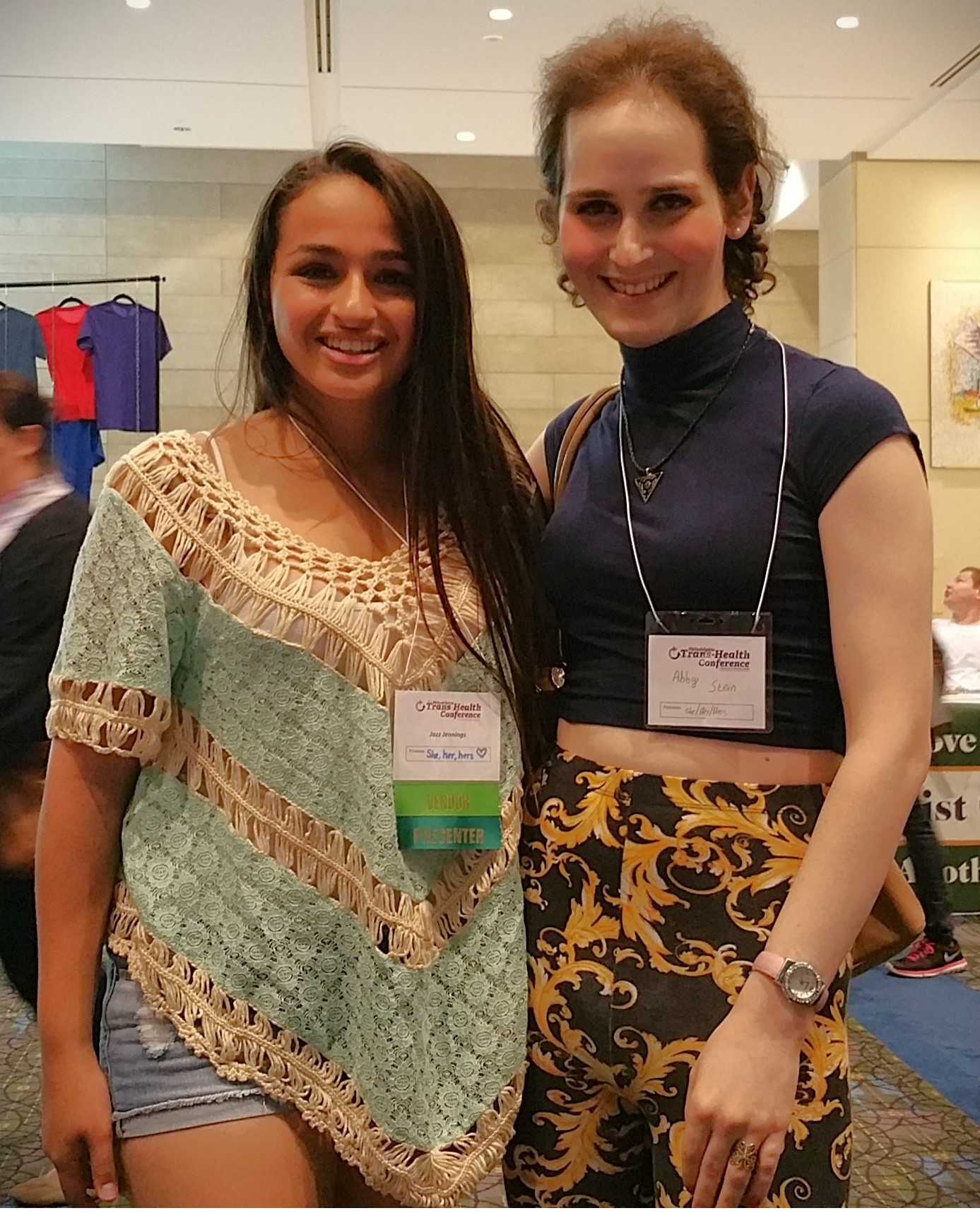
Jennings with trans activist and author Abby Stein at the 2016 Philadelphia Trans Health Conference. They were both named as one of the "9 Jewish LGBTQ Activists You Should Know" by JTA and TOI.

At six years old, Jennings and her family began appearing on television to speak about the challenges of growing up transgender. Her story has been covered by national television shows 20/20 and The Rosie Show, where she appeared alongside Chaz Bono.

In 2007, Jennings's parents founded TransKids Purple Rainbow Foundation to assist transgender youth; she is an honorary co-founder of the organization.

In 2011, I Am Jazz: A Family in Transition, a documentary about her life and family, premiered on the Oprah Winfrey Network.

In 2013, Jennings founded Purple Rainbow Tails, a company in which she fashions rubber mermaid tails to raise money for transgender children. That same year, in a follow-up interview with Barbara Walters on 20/20, they discussed Jennings's two-and-a-half-year battle with the United States Soccer Federation (USSF), the governing US body for the sport, to allow her to play on girls' teams. Aided by the National Center for Lesbian Rights, she succeeded in changing the USSF's policies to allow trans students to play.

Jennings co-wrote the 2014 children's book, I Am Jazz, with Jessica Herthel, the director of the Stonewall National Education Project. The book details her life as a transgender child. According to libertarian magazine Reason, "I Am Jazz is one of the most banned books in the [United States]".

In 2014, Jennings was a guest at the GLAAD Media Awards, sharing the stage with Zach Wahls and Lauren Foster. That year she was also named one of "The 25 Most Influential Teens of 2014" by Time, and recognized as the youngest person ever featured on Out's "Out 100" and Advocate's "40 Under 40" lists. She was also named in OUT's 2014 Trans 100 list, named a Human Rights Campaign Youth Ambassador, and received LogoTV's 2014 Youth Trailblazer Award. In March 2015, Johnson & Johnson announced a deal for Jennings to appear in Clean & Clear commercials. Jennings became a spokesmodel for Clean & Clear's "See The Real Me" digital campaign and shared "the trials of growing up transgender." She also modeled for the NOH8 Campaign. She also authored a piece for Time magazine's 100 Most Influential People List, writing the entry for Laverne Cox.

The day-to-day life of Jennings and her family is documented in the TLC reality series I Am Jazz, which debuted in July 2015. The seventh season premiered on November 30, 2021. In 2016, Jennings published a memoir, Being Jazz: My Life as a (Transgender) Teen.

In 2017, Robert Tonner and the Tonner Doll Company announced plans to produce a doll modeled after Jennings. It was to be the first doll to be marketed as transgender. The same year, Jennings voiced a teenage transgender character, Zadie, in the season finale of the Amazon Video animated series Danger & Eggs, who sings about acceptance, helping the two protagonists understand the meaning of a chosen family. Jennings described the experience as "groundbreaking," saying she was proud to be part of the show, especially in an episode that takes place at "a Pride event," saying it makes the role significant, meaningful, powerful, and special. In 2018, it was announced Jennings would star in a short film called Denim. It would focus on a transgender teen named Micayla and the events following the viral release of a photo of her in the girls' bathroom taken by a former friend. It was released to Amazon Prime Video on July 20, 2019. In 2019, Jennings made a guest appearance on the fifteenth season of the ABC program, What Would You Do? Jennings voiced the character Lily the Fairy in the 2019 episode "Cedric & the Fairies" of The Bravest Knight, an animated series.

== Personal life ==
In 2012, Jennings discussed her sexual orientation with Barbara Walters during her 20/20 interview, saying she was romantically attracted to boys and that she harbored some apprehension about dating because of her transgender identity. In a Q&A video on her YouTube channel in July 2014, Jennings said that she was pansexual, and that she loved people "for their personality", regardless of their sexual orientation and gender. In 2013, Jennings publicly discussed her wish to become a mother in the future.

=== Medical complications ===
In an interview published in the April 11, 2018, issue of People, Jennings said that, per her surgeons' instructions, she had lost at least 30 pounds (14 kg) in order to have gender confirmation surgery, which was scheduled for June 20, 2018. The surgery was successful, but was followed by complications that required another procedure. The surgery was performed by Dr. Jess Ting and Dr. Marci Bowers.

Jennings has said she struggles with mental illness and weight gain. In an Instagram post, Jennings said she has binge eating disorder. After her acceptance to Harvard, Jennings began to binge eat, gaining nearly 100 pounds, which caused her to delay her entry into college. She has said that her family has fat shamed her. In June 2025, Jennings revealed she had lost 100 pounds over two years.
