= Derrick Roberson =

American football player (born 1985)

No. 29, 39
- Position: Cornerback

Personal information
- Born: March 12, 1985 (age 41); Oakland Park, Florida, U.S.
- Listed height: 5 ft 10 in (1.78 m)
- Listed weight: 185 lb (84 kg)

Career information
- High school: Northeast (Oakland Park)
- College: Rutgers
- NFL draft: 2007: undrafted

Career history
- Houston Texans (2007–2008)*; Baltimore Ravens (2008)*; Minnesota Vikings (2008–2009)*; Tampa Bay Buccaneers (2009); Cleveland Browns (2010); Tampa Bay Buccaneers (2012)*
- * Offseason or practice squad member only

Career NFL statistics
- Total tackles: 3
- Pass deflections: 2
- Stats at Pro Football Reference

Derrick Roberson (born March 12, 1985) is an American former professional football player who was a cornerback in the National Football League (NFL). He played college football for the Rutgers Scarlet Knights and was signed by the Houston Texans as an undrafted free agent in 2007.

Roberson was also a member of the Baltimore Ravens, Minnesota Vikings, Tampa Bay Buccaneers, and Cleveland Browns.
