= Sheridan Technical High School =

High school in Florida, United States

Coordinates: 26.1022°N 80.1977°W

Information
- Established: August 2014; 11 years ago
- Enrollment: 527 (2021-2022)

Sheridan Technical High School is an all-magnet school in Fort Lauderdale, Florida, and a part of Broward County Public Schools.

It opened in August 2014 in the former Sunset Learning Center.

== Demographics ==
As of the 2021–22 school year, the total student enrollment was 527. The ethnic makeup of the school was 56.4% White, 35.9% Black, 42.3% Hispanic, 3.4% Asian, 3.2% Multiracial, 1.1% Native American or Native Alaskan, and 0% Native Hawaiian or Pacific Islander. Note that the adult enrollment in this school is not reflected in the total student enrollment number.
