= Joan Raymond =

Superintendent of the Houston Independent School District
- In office 1986–1991
- Preceded by: Billy Reagan
- Succeeded by: Frank Petruzielo

Superintendent of the South Bend Community School Corporation
- In office 2000–2006
- Preceded by: Dr. Virginia Calvin (1993-2000)
- Succeeded by: Robert L. Zimmerman

Personal details
- Born: February 1, 1936
- Died: February 22, 2017 (aged 81) Melbourne, Florida

Joan M. Raymond (February 1, 1936 – February 22, 2017) was a school district superintendent. She was such of Houston Independent School District (HISD) from 1986, until 1991, as well as for the Yonkers Public Schools, Elmhurst Community Unit School District 205, and the South Bend Community School Corporation.

She originated from the Northern United States, and matriculated from Ripon College (bachelor's in liberal arts), DePaul University (master's degree in history), and Northwestern University (PhD in school administration).

== Career ==
Her first job in the education sector was for Chicago Public Schools, where she served as a teacher, then as a guidance counselor, and in 1979, in administrative areas including being the assistant superintendent. From 1979 to 1986 she served as the superintendent of Yonkers Public Schools.

She began her term as HISD superintendent circa September 1986, replacing Billy Reagan.

Former HISD board member Donald R. McAdams described Raymond as "smart, informed, and decisive", and that the majority of the HISD board and business leaders in Houston approved of her. In 1985 the Texas Education Agency had downgraded the accreditation of HISD, but the district, under her leadership, recovered its accreditation. In addition, the district, by June and July 1987, the district had a $30 million surplus despite general budget issues in the state at the time. McAdams added that Raymond "had to be in control of everything she touched", and that "intimidation" was a feature of her tenure. Elizabeth Spates, an African-American board member, opposed Raymond, stating that she was a "hireling" and that she could not adapt to the culture of the Southern United States.

Raymond initiated the concept of The Rice School, which opened in 1994.

Raymond was voted out by Rod Paige, Felix Fraga, Wiley Henry, and other board members. Tim Fleck of the Houston Press wrote that the board members were "fed up with her abrasive style of management". Former board member Don McAdams stated that the board, when voting, felt pressure since there was fear that "If we tried to fire her and failed, HISD would be in chaos." Paige later gave more favorable statements about Raymond after he served as superintendent himself. Paige stated that he had a "stronger" view of her in retrospect. In 2000 South Bend Tribune wrote that by then, in the leadership in that district, "even critics have come to appreciate her wisdom."

From 1991 to 1993 she served as superintendent of two different school districts in the Chicago area: Lake Villa Community Consolidated School District 41 and River Forest Public Schools. In 1993 she became the superintendent of Elmhurst Community Unit School District 205, with her terms ending in 1999. The school board voted to confirm Raymond with four in favor and three against. In Elmhurst she helped convince voters to pass a referendum for a school bond.

In 2000 she became the superintendent of the South Bend Community School Corporation. She had intended to retire, but heard about the South Bend position from friends. Under her leadership she changed attendance boundaries as part of the "Plan Z" program and facilitated construction of new school facilities. She left her position in 2006 after announcing she would retire the previous year.

She chose to move to Melbourne, Florida. Circa 2016 she developed cancer, and died in her residence, in Melbourne on February 22, 2017.

Educational offices
Preceded by Billy Reagan	Houston Independent School District superintendent 1986-1991	Succeeded by Frank Petruzielo
Preceded by Dr. Virginia Calvin (1993-2000)	South Bend Community School Corporation superintendent 2000-2006	Succeeded by Robert L. Zimmerman
