= William J. Leary =

William James Leary (October 1, 1931 – May 19, 2018) was an American school administrator and academic who served as superintendent of schools in Boston and Broward County, Florida. He oversaw the Boston Public Schools during the early years of the Boston desegregation busing crisis. He also served as chair of the Department of Educational Leadership and Psychology at the University of Mississippi.

== Early life ==
Leary was born in Boston's Dorchester neighborhood. An Irish Catholic, he attended parochial schools, Matignon High School and Boston College. He earned a master’s degree from Boston State College, doctorates from Harvard University and Boston University, and was a Fulbright scholar at Sophia University. He also served in 124th Armored Ordnance Battalion, 2nd Armored Division of the United States Army. He was stationed in Germany and became a specialist 3rd class.

== Early career ==
Leary began his teaching career in 1958 at the Grover Cleveland School in Dorchester. He then taught at Boston Technical High School and Dorchester High School and became chairman of the history department at DHS in 1967. In 1969 he was named director of the newly-created system-wide curriculum department. As curriculum director, Leary established a K–12 minority studies program, a high-school level Asian studies program, and a legal education program.

Leary also served as an associate professor at Boston State's Department of Continuing Studies and was the head baseball and basketball coach at Matignon.

== School superintendent ==
=== Boston ===
In 1972, Leary was appointed to a three-year term as superintendent of the Boston Public Schools. In 1974, Judge W. Arthur Garrity Jr. ordered desegregation busing to racially integrate the school district. Leary insisted on fully complying with Garrity's orders, which resulted in him losing the support of the school committee. On April 29, 1975, the school committee voted 3-2 not to renew Leary's contract.

=== Later career ===
After leaving Boston Public Schools, Leary was hired as a visiting professor of education at Suffolk University and executive director of the Metropolitan Planning Project, a group of 52 Greater Boston school systems set up to promote racial integration. He then served superintendent of schools in Rockville Centre, New York (1977–1982), Babylon, New York, from (1982–1984), and Broward County, Florida (1984–1988). After working as an educational consultant in Minnesota, Leary returned to Massachusetts as superintendent of Gloucester Public Schools in 1989.

From 1993 to 1998, Leary was the chair of the Department of Educational Leadership and Psychology at the University of Mississippi. He then worked at Lynn University where he was the Director of the Educational Leadership program before he became the school's first ever Professor Emeritus. He was also an associate in education the Harvard Graduate School of Education and an adjunct professor at Salem State College, C.W. Post Campus of Long Island University, and Florida International University.

== Later life ==
Leary spent his later years in Boca Raton, Florida. He died on May 19, 2018, at the age of 86. He was survived by his wife of 57 years JoAnn Leary (nee Parodi) and their three daughters. He is buried in the South Florida National Cemetery.
