= College Academy @ BC =

School for advanced high school students in Davie, Florida

Location
- 3501 SW Davie Road; Building 2 Davie, Florida 33314

Information
- Former names: College Academy @ BCC
- School type: Public
- Motto: "Where a High School Goes to College"
- Established: 2001
- Principal: Bardetta Haygood
- Staff: 12 (FTE)
- Grades: 11-12
- Enrollment: 451 (2021–22)
- Student to teacher ratio: 33.25
- Colors: Purple and Red
- Website: https://collegeacademy.browardschools.com/

The College Academy @ BC is a joint venture between The School Board of Broward County and Broward College. The College Academy @ BC offers high school juniors and seniors enrolled as full-time students in the program the opportunity to receive a high school diploma from The School Board of Broward County, Florida and an Associate of Arts (AA) degree from Broward College. The rigorous nature of the program helps students qualify for the State of Florida Bright Futures Scholarship Program. The College Academy is designed for students who have the maturity required for college campus life and the academic ability to handle the rigor of college work. Both high school and dual enrollment courses are taught on the BC Central and North campuses. An extension to North Campus has been opened in the fall of 2015. Students take between 12 and 18 college credits Fall and Winter Terms and approximately 6 college credits Session I of the Summer Term. Students must maintain a 2.5 unweighted grade point average in order to remain at The College Academy.

== Eligibility ==
- Must be in 10th grade when applying
- Must be a Broward County resident, but exceptions can be made under certain circumstances.
- Applicants must have a 3.25 unweighted average.
- Completion of Geometry, World History, and HOPE before the start of their junior year.
- Good behavior/attendance record
- Two years of one foreign language are strongly recommended.
- Must earn required scores on ACCUPLACER before acceptance.

== Calendar ==
College Academy students and faculty follow the Broward College calendar. Both Broward College and College Academy classes will begin the fourth week in August.

== Demographics ==
As of the 2021–22 school year, the total student enrollment was 451. The ethnic makeup of the school was 58.8% White, 34.6% Hispanic, 25.5% Black, 11.3% Asian, 0.4% Pacific Islander, 3.5% Multiracial, and 0.4% Native American or Native Alaskan. Gender make-up is 64.5% female and 35.5% male.

== Recognition and rankings ==
In independent rankings, Niche (2025) lists College Academy @ BC #3 in Best College Prep Public High Schools in Florida and #9 in Best Public High Schools in Florida; it reports a 100% graduation rate.

U.S. News & World Report reports ~70% AP participation, 75% minority enrollment, and ~38% economically disadvantaged.
