= Frank Petruzielo =

American former school superintendent

Frank Petruzielo is a former school superintendent.

Petruzielo previously worked for the Miami-Dade County Public Schools. He became the superintendent of the Houston Independent School District (HISD) in 1991. Former HISD board member Don McAdams wrote that the hiring process for Petruzielo was fraught with tensions from the African-American community, though he made moves to appease that group and was elected. He served in that capacity for about three and one half years.

In 1994 he became the superintendent of Broward County Public Schools in Florida. According to McAdams, there had been so much conflict between the Houston city government and McAdams regarding tax requests from the latter that the board chose not to attempt to persuade him to stay at HISD instead of going to Broward County. In 1994 a 300-page report was released that criticized Petruzielo's management while at HISD.

From February 1999, to February 1, 2016, he was the superintendent of the Cherokee County School District in Georgia; he retired at the end of his tenure.
