= Old Deerfield School =

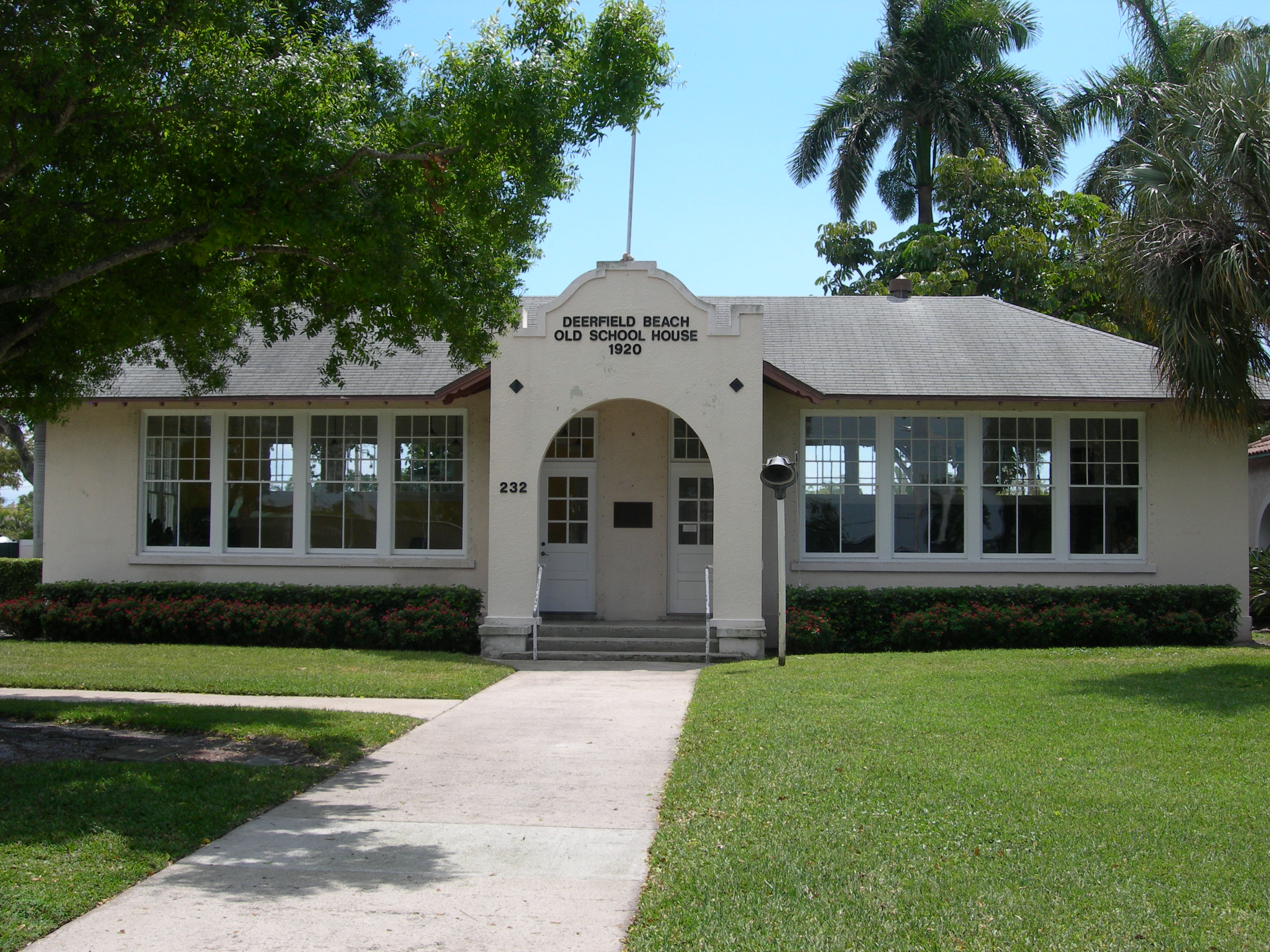

Location
- 232 NE 2nd Street; Deerfield Beach, Florida; United States; 26°19′13″N 80°05′57″W

Information
- Type: School
- Old Deerfield School
- U.S. National Register of Historic Places
- Built: 1920
- Built by: Edgar S. Tubbs
- Architect: A.E. Lewis
- NRHP reference No.: 99000525
- Added to NRHP: 5 May 1999

Old Deerfield School is a historic school in Deerfield Beach, Florida, United States. It is located at 232 North East 2nd Street. Designed by A.E. Lewis it was built by Edgar S. Tubbs in 1920. On May 5, 1999, it was added to the U.S. National Register of Historic Places.

The school is maintained by the Deerfield Beach Historical Society.
