= Coral Glades High School =

Public high school in Coral Springs, Florida, United States

Coordinates: 26.264°N 80.295°W

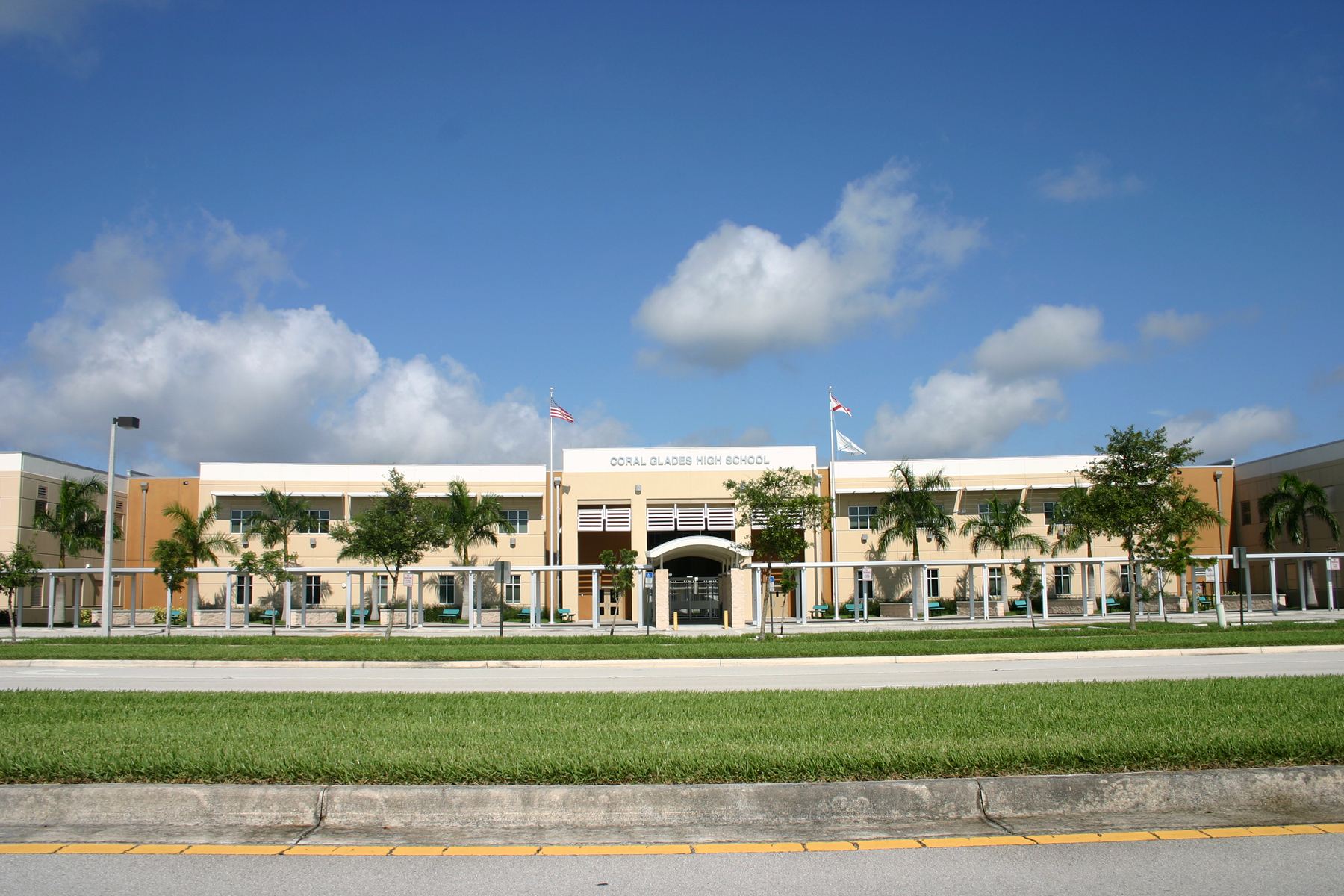
- 2700 Sportsplex Drive; Coral Springs, Florida 33065

Information
- Type: Public
- Established: 2004
- School district: Broward County Public Schools
- Superintendent: Howard Hepburn
- Principal: Mark Kaplan
- Staff: 97.00 (FTE)
- Grades: 9–12
- Enrollment: 2,860 (2024–2025)
- Student to teacher ratio: 28.29
- Campus type: Suburban
- Colors: teal, black, and white
- Website: coralglades.browardschools.com

Coral Glades High School is a public high school in Coral Springs, Florida, United States. Founded in 2004, it is part of the Broward School District. It educates students in grades 9 through 12.

== Academics ==
The school's core academics include math, social studies, science, and English.

Advanced Placement classes are offered each year including the AP Capstone Program. Students also can receive the AICE Cambridge Diploma.

== Activities ==
Coral Glades offers after-school sports teams. For the 2025–2026 school year, they will offer bowling, swimming, golf, cross country, volleyball, cheerleading, football, basketball, soccer, baseball, softball, track and field, lacross, flag football and tennis.

== Demographics ==
As of the 2024–25 school year, the total student enrollment was 2,860. The ethnic makeup of the school was 50.2% White, 40.7% Black, 37.1% Hispanic, 4.4% multiracial, 4.0% Asian, 0.4% Native American or Native Alaskan, and 0.3% Pacific Islander.
