= Broward County Public Schools =

School system in Florida, United States

Location
- Broward County Florida United States

District information
- Type: Public
- Motto: Educating Today's Students For Tomorrow's World
- Grades: Pre K-12
- Established: 1915; 111 years ago
- Superintendent: Howard Hepburn
- Schools: 326 (2023)
- Budget: $3.86 billion (2017)

Students and staff
- Students: 251,106 (2023) (6th-largest in U.S.)
- Teachers: 14,403 (2023)
- Staff: 31,691 (2023)

Other information
- Teachers' unions: Florida Education Association
- Website: browardschools.com

Broward County Public Schools is a public school district serving Broward County, Florida, United States. It is the sixth largest public school system in the nation. Headquartered in the city downtown of Fort Lauderdale, it is the sole school district in the county.

During the 2023–2024 school year, Broward County Public Schools served 251,106 students enrolled in 326 schools and education centers district-wide.

Following the 2025-2026 school year, Broward County Public School became an "A" rated school district for the 3rd consecutive year, according to the Florida Department of Edication.

== History ==
Prior to 1966, the county provided completely separate sets of schools for White students and Black students. In 1966, the school district began to experiment with allowing a limited number of Black students to learn alongside White students, ultimately integrating the races in 1969.

William J. Leary served as superintendent until 1988; the school board did not want him to serve out the remainder of his term, so it paid him $113,516 in severance.

Virgil "Sam" Morgan became superintendent of Broward county in 1988. In 1994 Broward's superintendent, Virgil "Sam" Morgan retired after leading the School district for more than five years.

In 1994, Frank Petruzielo became the superintendent. Petruzielo's time as superintendent ended in 1999.

Frank Till became the Superintendent in 1999 after Frank Petruzielo's retirement. Frank Till was fired by the school board for no apparent reason in 2006.

James Notter replaced Till in 2006. In 2011, James Notter resigned from his position as superintendent.

Robert Runcie became superintendent following the resignation of James Notter in 2011. Under Runcie, the Parkland school shooting at Marjory Stoneman Douglas High took place, followed by the COVID-19 pandemic. In 2021, Robert Runcie was arrested by the Florida Department of Law Enforcement on a felony charge of perjury, after a grand jury commissioned by Gov. Ron DeSantis in 2019 to review safety and security matters after the Parkland school shooting recommend it. Robert Runcie then resigned his position In 2021.

In 2021, Dr. Vickie Cartwright was chosen as interim superintendent by the Broward County School Board. Although the process was controversial, she was later selected as the permanent superintendent. In November 2022, Dr. Vickie Cartwright was fired by the Broward County School Board, following four board members being replaced by Governor Ron DeSantis. In December 2022, the newly elected board members rescinded her firing. Dr. Vickie Cartwright later resigned in 2023.

Peter B. Licata became superintendent in August 2023. Licata later retired in April 2024 after being superintendent for only 10 months due to health concerns. Licata was replaced by Howard Hepburn as superintendent on the same day. Howard Hepburn is the current superintendent.

Throughout 2023, a contingent of Broward County citizens called Truth Matters has attended school board meetings, generally speaking against motions supported by gubernatorial appointees and for motions supported by elected school board members.

== School Board ==
The current Superintendent of schools is Dr. Howard Hepburn. The members of the school board, which oversee the district, are as follows:

- District 1 – Maura McCarthy Bulman
- District 2 – Rebecca Thompson
- District 3 – Sarah Leonardi (Chair)
- District 4 – Lori Alhadeff
- District 5 – Dr. Jeff Holness (Vice Chair)
- District 6 – Adam Cervera, Esq.
- District 7 – Nora Rupert
- District 8 (At Large) – Dr. Allen Zeman
- District 9 (At Large) – Debra Hixon

== Superintendent of Schools ==
- William J. Leary (1984–1988)
- Sam Morgan (1988–1994)
- Frank Petruzielo (1994–1999)
- Frank Till (1999–2006)
- James Notter (2006–2011)
- Robert Runcie (2011–2021)
- Vickie Cartwright (2021–2023)
- Earlean C. Smiley (2023)
- Peter B. Licata (2023–2024)
- Howard Hepburn (2024–present)

== Controversies ==
=== Handling of Marjory Stoneman Douglas High School Shooting ===
On February 14, 2018, a former student opened fire at a Broward school, Marjory Stoneman Douglas High School in Parkland, Florida, murdering 17 people and injuring 17 others.

Superintendent Robert Runcie and the School Board faced criticism for their handling of policies and the lack of guidance assisted to the shooter while he was a student. Runcie and the Board faced particular criticism, including from some parents of students at Stoneman Douglas High School, for the creation of an alternative discipline program for students accused of nonviolent misdemeanors called "Promise", which the Parkland shooter had been referred to.

In the lead up to the 2018 gubernatorial election, Republican candidate Ron DeSantis vowed to remove Runcie from his office, although he conceded that only the school board could do so. On February 13, 2019, now Florida Governor DeSantis announced that he had petitioned a statewide grand jury investigation.

In May 2021, after the grand jury indicted him for perjury during their investigation, Runcie announced his intention to step down. Supporters of Runcie accused the grand jury investigation that led to his indictment of being politically motivated.

=== School closures and mask mandates during the COVID-19 pandemic ===
Amidst the COVID-19 pandemic, the school district switched almost entirely to online classes in March 2020 and gradually returned to in-person instruction starting in the fall of 2020. The exact timing of school re-openings led to tension between the school board and the state government. Throughout the 2020–2021 school year, the district required all students and staff to wear face masks as a preventative measure. In the fall of 2021, growing public opposition to mask mandates led Governor Ron DeSantis to prohibit local school districts from requiring masks. The school board chose to defy the state government and continue requiring masks, along with several other school districts in the state. In response the Florida Board of Education voted to prevent the district from doing so and could replace elected board members. DeSantis withheld funding from school districts that required masks. The federal government stepped in to replace the money with federal funds, but after the state blocked that funding as well, the US Department of Education warned the state that it may have violated federal law.

== List of schools ==
During the 2023-2024 academic school year, the District served 251,106 students. The district covers a total of 326 institutions: 137 elementary schools, 35 middle schools, 32 high schools, 9 combination schools, 3 technical colleges, 23 centers, and 87 charter schools.

=== 6–12 secondary schools ===
- Dillard High School 6-12 (1907)
- Lauderhill 6–12 STEM-MED
- Millennium 6–12 Collegiate Academy
- Pines Collegiate Academy 6–12

=== High schools ===
- Atlantic Technical College and Technical High School (1973)
- Blanche Ely High School (1951)
- Boyd H. Anderson High School (1971)
- Broward Virtual Education High (2001)
- Charles W. Flanagan High School (1996)
- Coconut Creek High School (1971)
- Cooper City High School (1971)
- College Academy @ BC (2001)
- Coral Glades High School (2004)
- Coral Springs High School (1975)
- Cypress Bay High School (2002)
- Dave Thomas Educational Center – formerly North County Educational Ctr. (1986)
- Dillard High School (1907)
- Deerfield Beach High School (1970)
- Everglades High School (2003)
- Fort Lauderdale High School (1899)
- Hallandale High School (1973)
- Hollywood Hills High School (1967)
- J. P. Taravella High School (1980)
- McArthur High School (1961)
- McFatter Technical College and Technical High School (1985)
- Miramar High School (1970)
- Monarch High School (2003)
- Northeast High School (1962)
- Nova High School (1960)
- Piper High School (1971)
- Plantation High School (1963)
- Pompano Beach High School (1928)
- Sheridan Technical College and High School (1967)
- South Broward High School (1952)
- South Plantation High School (1971)
- Marjory Stoneman Douglas High School (1990)
- Stranahan High School (1953)
- West Broward High School (2008)
- Western High School (1981)

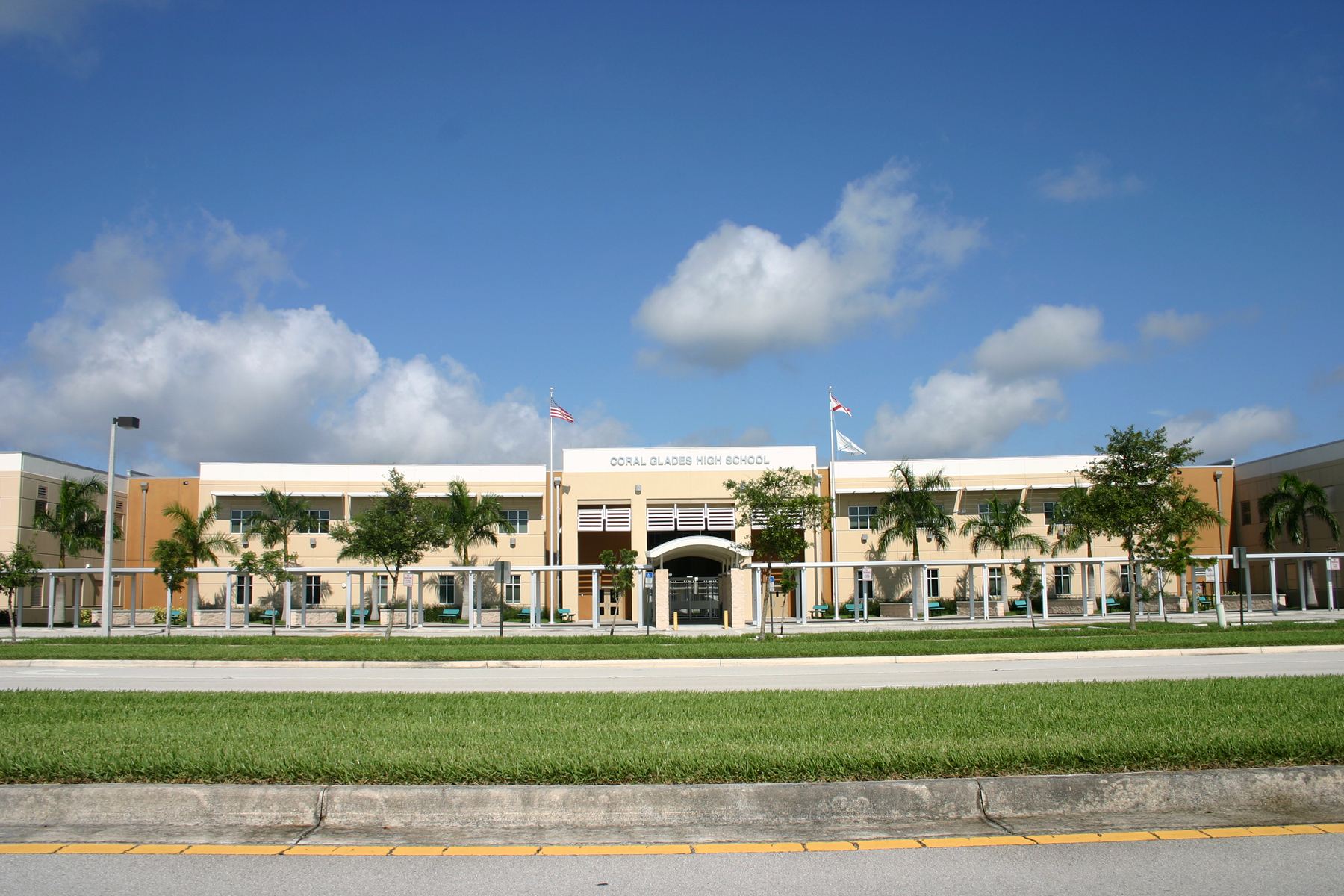
Coral Glades High School in Coral Springs

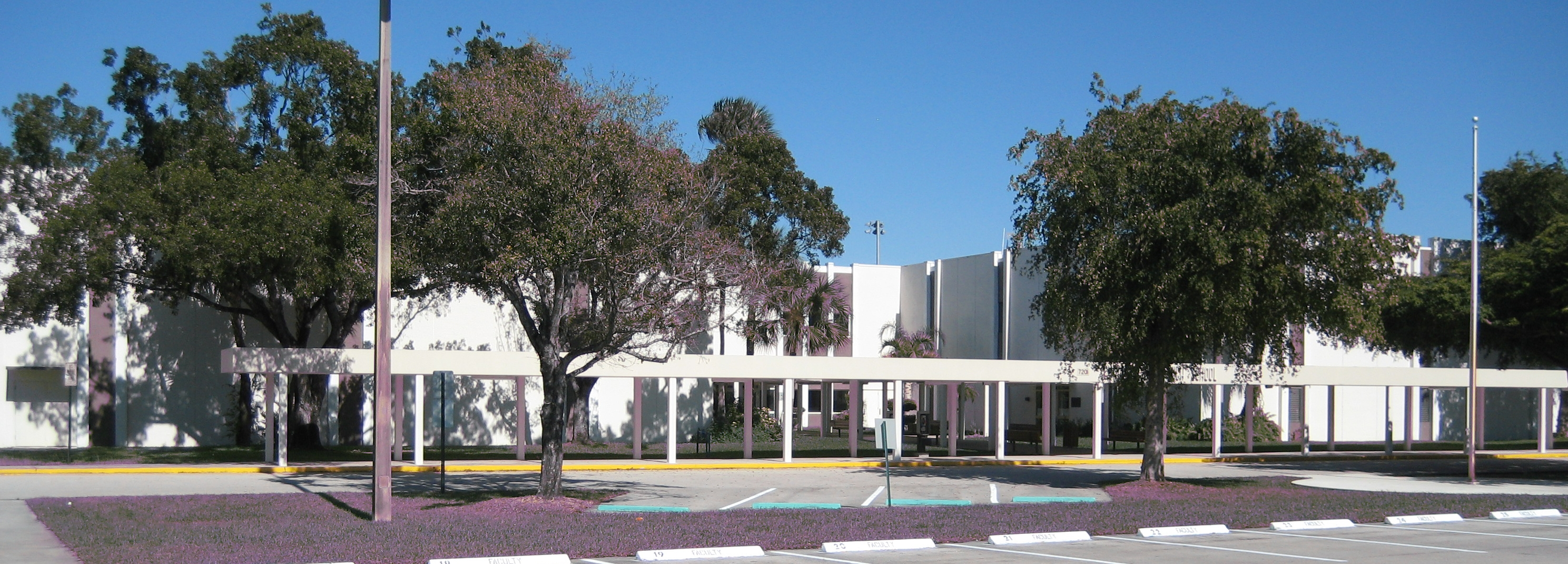
Coral Springs High School in Coral Springs

=== Middle schools ===
- Apollo Middle School
- Arthur Ashe Middle School (closed, now
  a campus of Atlantic Technical College)
- Attucks Middle School
- Bair Middle School
- Broward Virtual Middle
- Coral Springs Middle School
- Crystal Lake Middle School
- Deerfield Beach Middle School
- Driftwood Middle School
- Falcon Cove Middle School
- Forest Glen Middle School
- Glades Middle School
- Indian Ridge Middle School
- Lauderdale Lakes Middle School
- Lyons Creek Middle School
- Margate Middle School
- McNicol Middle School
- New Renaissance Middle School
- New River Middle School
- Nova Middle School
- Olsen Middle School
- Parkway Middle School of the Arts
- Pioneer Middle School
- Plantation Middle School
- Pompano Beach Middle School
- Ramblewood Middle School
- James S. Richtards Middle School
- Sawgrass Springs Middle School
- Seminole Middle School
- Silver Lakes Middle School
- Silver Trail Middle School
- Sunrise Middle School
- Tequesta Trace Middle School
- Walter C. Young Middle School
- Westglades Middle School
- Westpine Middle School
- Central Charter School
- William Dandy Middle School

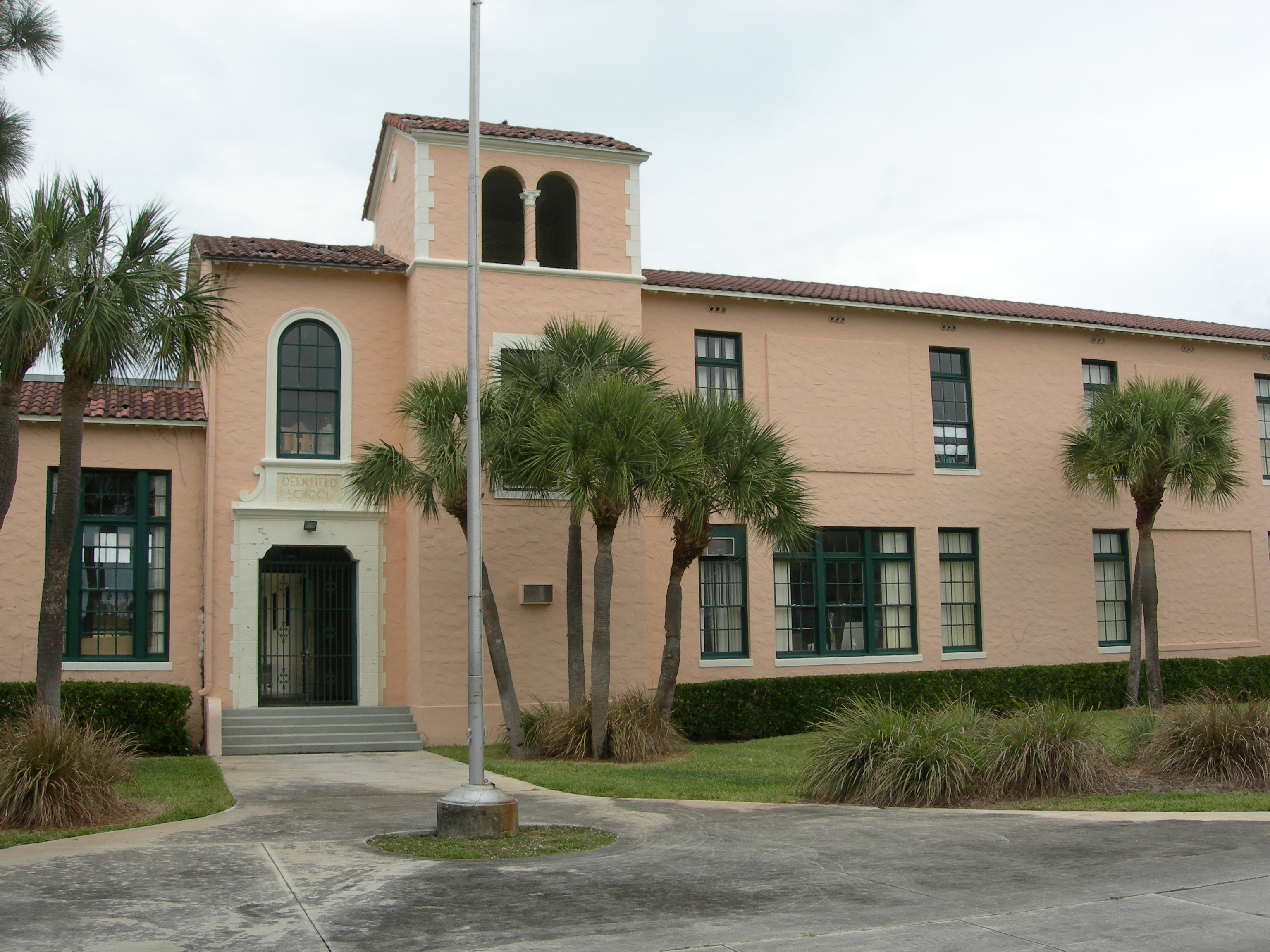
Deerfield Beach Elementary School in Deerfield Beach

Everglades High School in Miramar

=== Elementary schools ===
- Annabel C. Perry PreK-8
- Atlantic West Elementary School
- Banyan Elementary School
- Bayview Elementary School
- Beachside Montessori Village (K–8)
- Bennett Elementary School
- Mary M. Bethune Elementary School of the Arts
- Boulevard Heights Elementary School
- Broadview Elementary School
- Castle Hill Elementary School
- Central Park Elementary School
- Challenger Elementary School
- Chapel Trail Elementary School
- Coconut Creek K–8
- Coconut Palm Elementary School
- Colbert Elementary School
- Collins Elementary School
- Cooper City Elementary School
- Coral Cove K–8
- Coral Park Elementary School
- Coral Springs Elementary School
- Country Hills Elementary School
- Country Isles Elementary School
- Cresthaven Elementary School
- Croissant Park Elementary School
- Cypress Elementary School
- Dania Elementary School
- Davie Elementary School
- Deerfield Beach Elementary School
- Deerfield Park Elementary School
- Dillard Elementary School
- Discovery Elementary School
- Dolphin Bay Elementary School
- Charles Drew Elementary School
- Driftwood Elementary School
- Eagle Point Elementary School
- Eagle Ridge Elementary School
- Embassy Creek Elementary School (1992)
- Endeavour Primary Learning Center
- Everglades Elementary School
- Fairway Elementary School
- Flamingo Elementary School
- Floranada Elementary School
- Forest Hills Elementary School
- Stephen Foster Elementary School
- Fox Trail Elementary School
- Gator Run Elementary School
- Griffin Elementary School
- Gulfstream Academy of Hallandale Beach K–8
- Hawkes Bluff Elementary School
- Heron Heights Elementary School
- Harbordale Elementary School
- Hollywood Central K–8
- Hollywood Hills Elementary School
- Hollywood Park Elementary School
- Horizon Elementary School
- James S. Hunt Elementary School
- Indian Trace Elementary School
- Martin Luther King Elementary School
- Lake Forest Elementary School
- Lakeside Elementary School
- Larkdale Elementary School
- Lauderdale Manors Elementary School
- Lauderhill Paul Turner Elementary School
- Liberty Elementary School
- Lloyd Estates Elementary School
- Manatee Bay Elementary School
- Maplewood Elementary School
- Margate Elementary School
- McNab Elementary School
- Meadowbrook Elementary School
- Miramar Elementary School
- Mirror Lake Elementary School
- Morrow Elementary School
- Nob Hill Elementary School
- Norcrest Elementary School
- North Andrews Gardens Elementary School
- North Fork Elementary School
- North Lauderdale Elementary School
- North Side Elementary School
- Nova Blanche Forman Elementary School
- Nova Dwight D. Eisenhower Elementary School
- Oakland Park Elementary School
- Oakridge Elementary School
- Orange Brook Elementary School
- Oriole Elementary School
- Palm Cove Elementary School
- Palmview Elementary School
- Panther Run Elementary School (1998)
- Park Lakes Elementary School
- Park Ridge Elementary School
- Park Springs Elementary School
- Park Trails Elementary School
- Parkside Elementary School
- Pasadena Lakes Elementary School
- Pembroke Lakes Elementary School
- Pembroke Pines Elementary School
- Peters Elementary School
- Pines Lakes Elementary School
- Pinewood Elementary School
- Plantation Elementary School
- Plantation Park Elementary School
- Pompano Beach Elementary School
- Quiet Waters Elementary School
- Ramblewood Elementary School
- Riverglades Elementary School
- Riverland Elementary School
- Riverside Elementary School
- C. Robert Markham Elementary School
- Rock Island Elementary School
- Royal Palm Elementary School
- Sanders Park Elementary School
- Sandpiper Elementary School
- Sawgrass Elementary School
- Sea Castle Elementary School
- Sheridan Hills Elementary School
- Sheridan Park Elementary School
- Silver Lakes Elementary School
- Silver Palms Elementary School
- Silver Ridge Elementary School
- Silver Shores STEAM Academy K–8
- Stirling Elementary School
- Sunland Park Academy
- Sunset Lakes Elementary School
- Sunshine Elementary School
- Tamarac Elementary School
- Tedder Elementary School
- Thurgood Marshall Elementary School
- Tradewinds Elementary School
- Tropical Elementary School
- Village Elementary School
- Walker Elementary School
- Watkins Elementary School
- Welleby Elementary School
- West Hollywood Elementary School
- Westchester Elementary School
- Westwood Heights Elementary School
- Wilton Manors Elementary School
- Winston Park Elementary School
- Virginia Shuman Young Elementary School

=== Education Centers ===
- Atlantic Technical College
- Arthur Ashe Campus
- Beachside Montesorri Village
- Bright Horizons Center
- Broward Estates Early Learning Center
- Charles Drew Family Resource Center
- Cross Creek School
- Cypress Run Education Center
- Endeavour Primary Learning Center
- Gulfstream Academy North
- Pine Ridge Ed. Center
- Quest Center
- Gulfstream Academy North
- Gulfstream Early Learning
- Henry Perry Center
- Whiddon Rogers Education Center
- Whispering Pines Center
- Wingate Oaks Center

=== Former segregated schools ===
At first all the nonwhite schools were, as elsewhere, elementary schools. In part through the efforts of principals Blanche General Ely and Joseph A. Ely, by the end of the segregation era there were three nonwhite high schools in Broward County: Crispus Attucks in Hollywood, Dillard in Ft. Lauderdale, and Blanche Ely in Pompano Beach.

- B.F. James Elementary School, Hallandale
- Bethune Elementary, 2400 Meade St., Hollywood
- Blanche Ely High School, Pompano, opened 1952, still in use
- Braithwaite School, a Rosenwald school, opened 1929, demolished
- Carver Ranches Elementary School, 2201 S. 44th Ave., West Hollywood, now West Park
- Charles Drew Elementary School
- Chester A. Moore Elementary School, 912 Pembroke Rd., Hallandale, demolished
- Collins Elementary School, 1050 NW 2nd St., Dania
- Colored School No. 11, NW 3rd Ave. and 2nd St., Deerfield Beach, later known as Dillard School, then Walker Elementary School, 1925. Building houses the Old Deerfield School Museum.
- Crispus Attucks High School, Hollywood
- Dania Colored School, 1905, in the St. Ruth Missionary Baptist Church. Another school built 1917.
- Davie Negro School
- Deerfield Colored School, opened 1903, first school for African Americans in Broward County
- Dillard Elementary School, 1959. At one time was Dillard High School, Ft. Lauderdale.
- Fort Lauderdale Colored
- Hallandale Rosenwald School, 1929
- Lanier Junior High School, 1st Ave. and 9th St., Hallandale
- Hammondsville Colored School
- Liberia Rosenwald School, also known as Attucks School, 3600 NW 22 Ave., Hollywood, 1929
- Lincoln Park Elementary, 600 NW 19th Ave.
- Markham Park Elementary School
- Oakland Park Negro School, later Carter G. Woodson Elementary School, 3721 NE 5th Ave.
- One-room school at Pompano Migratory Labor Camp
- Pompano Colored School, 718 NW 6th St., 1928, renamed Coleman Elementary School in 1954, demolished
- Pompano Project Elementary School
- Sanders Park Elementary School
- Sunland Park Elementary, 919 NW 13th Ave.

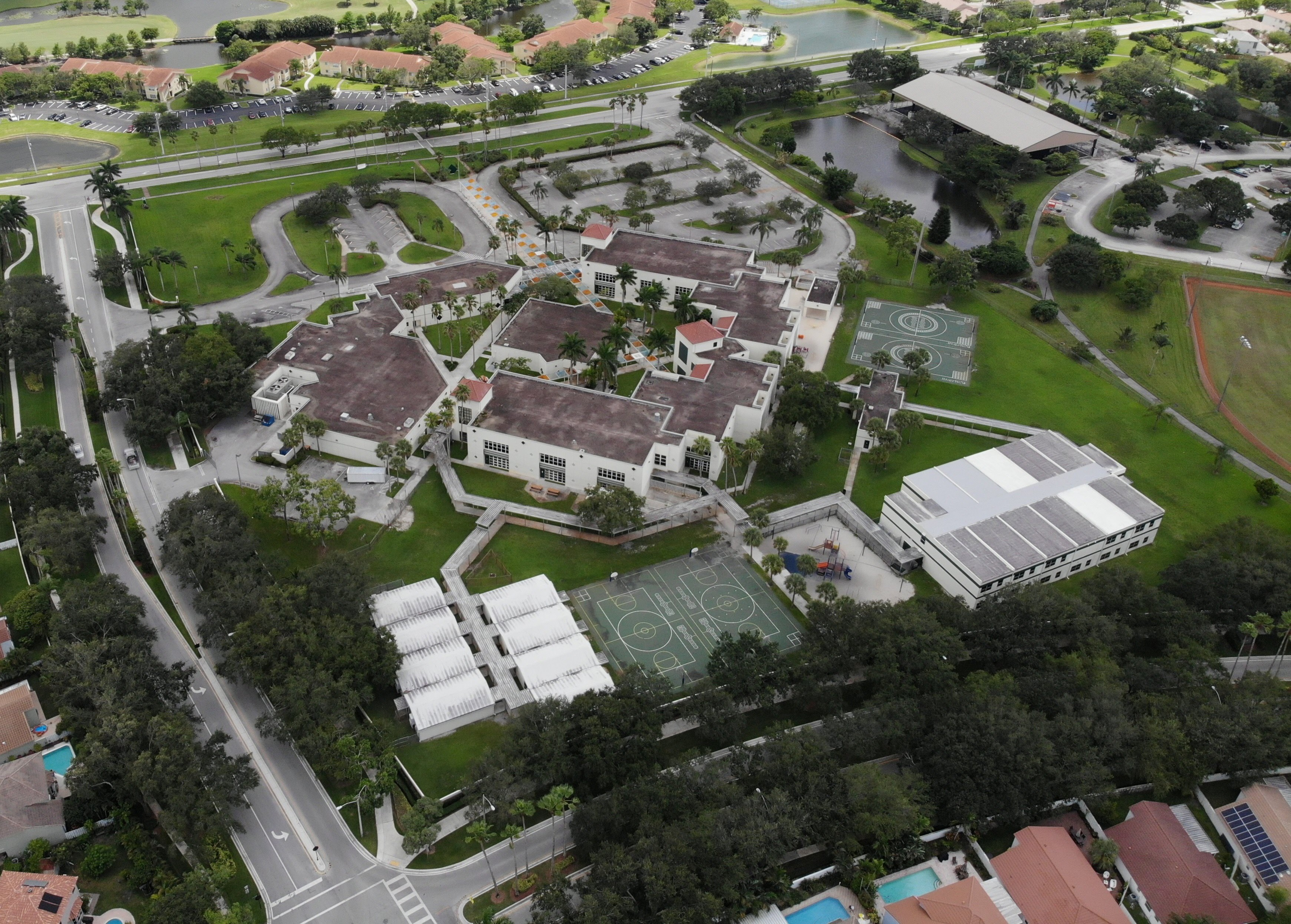
Sawgrass Elementary School in Sunrise

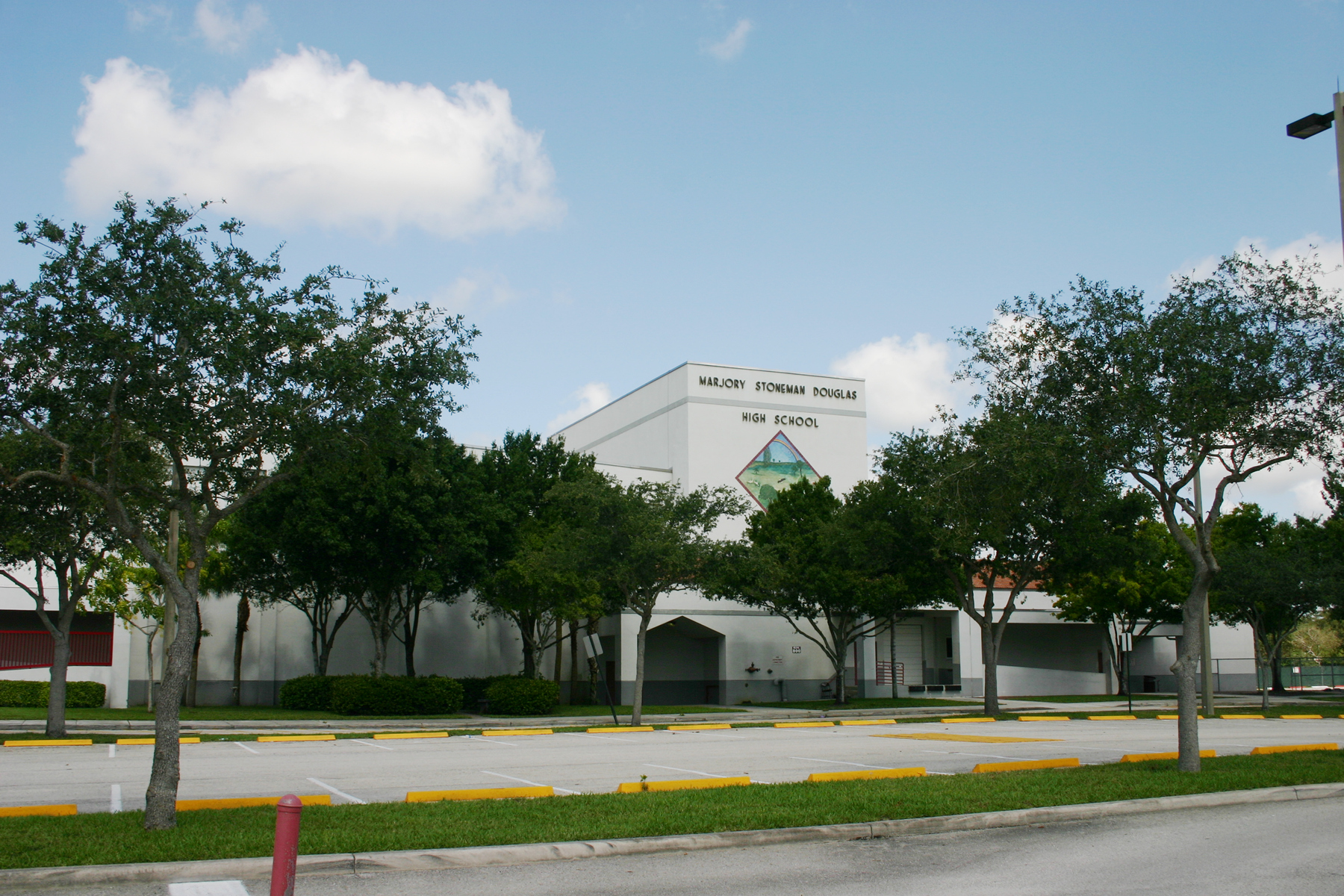
Marjory Stoneman Douglas High School in Parkland

Monarch High School in Coconut Creek

== See also ==
- WBEC-TV (Broward Schools' educational channel)
- WKPX (Broward Schools' radio station)
- List of school districts in Florida
