= Peter B. Licata =

American educator

Peter B. Licata is an American educator and the superintendent of Fort Worth Independent School District in Texas since March 2026, hired as part of the state takeover. Previously, he served as superintendent of Broward County Public Schools, the sixth-largest school district in the United States and the second largest in the state of Florida. He became the superintendent of Broward County Public Schools on July 11, 2023, and resigned in April 2024 - serving as the Superintendent for only 10 months. Licata resigned citing health concerns.

== Early life and education ==
Licata grew up in Pompano Beach, Florida, where he attended McNab Elementary School. He is the youngest of five children. His father was a lifetime coach and an Algebra teacher.

He has a Bachelor of Arts in Business Administration from University of Miami, a Master of Science in Educational Leadership from Barry University and a Doctor of Philosophy in Global Leadership from Lynn University.

After his Bachelor's, he started as a seventh grade Geography teacher.

== Career ==
Licata spent three decades in education, 3 of those years as a teacher in the School District of Palm Beach County.

Licata began his career in education as a teacher at John F. Kennedy Middle School and Olympic Heights High School, both in Boca Raton, Florida. He was an assistant principal at Eagles' Landing Middle School, and principal at Boca Raton Middle School and Olympic Heights Community High School.

He held several district leadership roles beginning in 2009, eventually becoming the Regional Superintendent of the South Region of the School District of Palm Beach County in 2019. In his role, he oversaw 59 schools, 65,000 students, and over 5,000 teachers.

Licata became Superintendent of Broward County Public Schools in 2023. Licata replaced former school superintendent Dr. Vickie Cartwright. He resigned in April 2024 due to health concerns.

From 2010 to 2019, Licata was also an adjunct professor in the Principal Internship Program at Florida Atlantic University.

=== Fort Worth Independent School District (ISD) ===
In March 2026, as part of the state takeover, Texas Education Commissioner Mike Morath appointed Licata as the superintendent of Fort Worth Independent School District, ninth largest school district in Texas. Licata will earn an annual base salary of $360,000 under a four-year contract approved by the state-appointed Board of Managers, extending his tenure through at least 2030. In addition to his base pay, the contract includes a monthly $1,000 car allowance and a $300 monthly technology stipend. Licata is also eligible for performance-based incentives and retention bonuses, with potential additional compensation tied to district goals set by the Board of Managers. His compensation package is based on the salary structure of his predecessor and was negotiated with the Texas Education Agency (TEA) before being approved by the Board of Managers.
