= Pompano Beach High School =

College-preparatory school in Pompano Beach, Florida, United States

Location
- 600 NE 13th Avenue; Pompano Beach, Broward County, Florida 33060; United States; 26.2358869°N 80.1102139°W

Information
- Type: Public Secondary
- Motto: "Home of the Golden Tornadoes"
- Established: 1926
- School district: Broward County Public Schools
- Principal: Lisa Spencer
- Staff: 50.00 (FTE)
- Faculty: 57
- Grades: 9 to 12
- Enrollment: 1299
- Student to teacher ratio: 26.22
- Campus type: Suburban
- Colors: Blue and Gold
- Mascot: Beanpickers (1926-1955) Tornadoes (1955-1958) Golden Tornadoes (1958-present)
- Website: www.PompanoBeachHigh.BrowardSchools.com

Pompano Beach High School (formerly Pompano High School, Pompano Beach Senior High School, and The Pompano Beach High School Institute of International Studies) is a college-preparatory school in Pompano Beach, Florida, United States, and instructs grades 9 through 12.

Founded in 1926, it is the second oldest high school in the Broward County Public Schools district.

According to the 2023–2024 edition of U.S. News & World Report, Pompano Beach High School is the 286th best high school in the country, the 25th best in the State of Florida, and the #1 Best Public High School in Broward County.

Since 1958, the school's sports teams have been named the Golden Tornadoes.

== Academics and ranking ==
Pompano Beach High School is one of the highest achieving schools in Broward County. The school has been awarded the Blue Ribbon School of Excellence status, which is considered the highest honor an American school can achieve and is shared by only 3.9% of schools nationwide and is also an Apple Distinguished School for its use of innovative technology and project-based learning to educated students. Both of these awards were accomplished under the guidance of principal Dave Gordon, who retired in 2010.

In 2006, Governor Jeb Bush recognized Pompano Beach High School as one of the top fifty schools in the state of Florida. Pompano ranked 13th out of nearly 1,100 high schools in the state and was recognized as the highest ranked fully comprehensive high school in Broward County. Pompano Beach High School also ranked 6th in the state for the greatest gains in student achievement for its lowest quartile of students.

Pompano Beach High School earned an "A" rating 11 times based on FCAT scores since 2002.

In 2024, Pompano Beach High School was ranked one of the Best High Schools in the nation by U.S. News & World Report, earning the Gold Medal Status. It is listed as the 25th Best High School in the State of Florida and as the 286th Best High School in the United States for 2023-2024.

For the 2022–2023 academic year, Pompano Beach High School reported a 100% graduation rate.

== History ==
=== Early years (1926–1997) ===
Pompano High was founded in 1926, in Pompano Beach, Florida, to address the growing need for secondary education in northeastern Broward County.

Pompano's first school was opened in 1897 and by 1913, it had changed location three times. That school's capacity of 50 students was not large enough for the high school-aged students, who were initially bused to Fort Lauderdale High until 1926 when a school for grades 1-12 was built in Pompano.

The first class to graduate from Pompano High was the class of 1928, which had only twelve students.

The school's sports teams were called the Beanpickers after the part-time job that many of the school's students had in the formerly agricultural area of the time. The Beanpicker was also the name of the school's yearbook, which was first published in 1943.

In 1947, following the merger of the towns of Pompano and Pompano Beach, the school changed its name to Pompano Beach High School.

In 1955, the student body voted to change its nickname from the Beanpickers to the Tornadoes.

In 1958, the school's sports teams were renamed to the Golden Tornadoes.

In 1960, a new football field, gymnasium, theater, classrooms and new offices were built. The school moved to its present location on March 14, 1960 and was at last developing with a full range of offered courses, sports, civic organizations and clubs.

In 1985, Pompano Beach High School was temporarily closed due to declining enrollment. For 12 years it served as a center for adult education and community programs.

In 1997, the school reopened to accept its first new graduating class of high school students, the class of 2001.

=== Modern era (1997–present) ===
In 1997, the school was resurrected as a satellite campus of Blanche Ely High School called the Pompano Beach High School Institute for International Studies. Later, it once again became a school in its own right. Almost always known simply as Pompano Beach High School, it was Broward County's first all-magnet school, specializing in "International Affairs with Informational Technology."

Located on the 1960 campus, the school grew to fill the buildings it had once occupied, with the exception of several buildings that had come to be used in the intervening years by the City of Pompano Beach and by the Broward County School District.

In 2001, the first class graduated from Pompano since the school's closure in 1985.

In February 2004, the school's name was shortened to Pompano Beach High School.

On April 13, 2004, a newly built campus opened adjacent to the older campus. On this new campus, the school's current cafeteria, library, offices, and classrooms are contained in a single three-story building. The new facility boasts a totally Wireless environment with high-speed connectivity, a 3:1 student to computer ratio and a network with multiple servers. The school transformed their classrooms into 21st century digital models to include interactive "smart" boards, ceiling-mounted LCD projectors, and sound and voice amplification systems to help teachers meet student needs.

A new auditorium was completed in 2005, which the school uses for concerts, plays and special guest presentations. The two original gyms are still in use and have been renovated. The buildings that had been used by the school since its 1997 reopening were demolished to make room for the school's parking lot.

Despite having been closed for 12 years in recent history, the school maintains some connections with its long past. Volume 64 of the Beanpicker was published in 2007; the volume numbers for the years 1985–97 were skipped. Alumni from the school's earlier days continue to meet for reunions.

== Athletics ==
- 1957: Pompano Beach girls’ golf team wins the state title behind medalist Phyllis (Tish) Preuss.
- 1957-1959: Pompano Beach football team wins three consecutive Suncoast conference championships under coach Dub Palmer.
- 1962-1964: Pompano's top male swimmer John Nelson breaks state records in 100 and 200 freestyle competitions for 3 consecutive years.
- 1964-1965: Pompano Beach wins boys and girls state swimming championship in 1964 and the girls' title in 1965 under Bob Ousley.
- 2004: Pompano Beach wins the Girls' Track and Field Class 2A State Championship and placed 5th nationally at the Nike Indoor Championships in the 4 x 200 Meter Relay with Shantia Moss scoring an individual first place win in the 60 metres hurdles event.
- 2025: Pompano Beach JROTC's Raiders Team placed 3rd in the County as the Most Competitive team and placed 2nd in the Florida 6th Brigade State Championship in the Team run
- Baseball
- Basketball (boys and girls)
- Cheerleading
- Cross country running
- Flag football
- Football
- Golf (boys and girls)
- Army JROTC Raiders
- Lacrosse (boys and girls
- Soccer (boys and girls)
- Softball
- Swimming
- Tennis (boys and girls)
- Track and field
- Volleyball
- Water Polo)

== Demographics ==
As of the 2026–27 school year, the total student enrollment is 1,322. The ethnic makeup of the school is roughly 62.6% White, 25.97% Black, 29.7% Hispanic or Latino of any race, 7.08% Asian, 4.02% Multiracial, 0.14% Native American or Native Alaskan, and 0.14% Native Hawaiian or Pacific Islander.

== Notable alumni ==
- Charlene Honeywell, United States District Judge on the United States District Court for the Middle District of Florida
- Quintin Jones, former Professional Football Player for the Houston Oilers.
- Barry Krauss, Professional Football Player for the Baltimore/Indianapolis Colts and Miami Dolphins.
- Pam Kruse, former World Record Holder in the 400 Meter Freestyle and 1968 Olympics Silver Medalist in the 800 Meter Freestyle.
- Myron Lewis, NFL cornerback for the Tampa Bay Buccaneers
- John Nelson, 1968 Olympic Gold Medalist in the 4×200 Meter Freestyle Relay and 1964 Summer Olympics Silver Medalist in the 1500 Meter Freestyle.
- Dan Nugent, former NFL player for the Washington Redskins
