= List of Alpha Kappa Mu chapters =

Alpha Kappa Mu is a collegiate honor society that recognizes academic excellence in all areas of study. In the following list of chapters, active chapters are indicated in bold and inactive chapters are in italics.

Chapter	Charter date	Institution	Location	Status	Ref.
**Gamma Tau**	1937	North Carolina A&T State University	Greensboro, North Carolina	Active	
**Alpha Epsilon**	1937	Bennett College	Greensboro, North Carolina	Active	
**Phi Beta Tau**	November 26, 1937	Tennessee State University	Nashville, Tennessee	Active	
**Beta Tau Upsilon**	1937	Tuskegee University	Tuskegee, Alabama	Active	
**Alpha Delta Sigma**	1937	West Virginia State University	Institute, West Virginia	Active	
**Alpha Beta Tau**	1938	University of Arkansas at Pine Bluff	Pine Bluff, Arkansas	Active	
Eta Sigma Tau	1938	Knoxville College	Knoxville, Tennessee	Inactive	
Alpha Kappa Sigma	1939	Johnson C. Smith University	Charlotte, North Carolina	Inactive	
Zeta Rho Chi	1940	Bluefield State University	Bluefield, West Virginia	Inactive	
**Rho Beta Chi**	1940	Fayetteville State University	Fayetteville, North Carolina	Active	
**Kappa Delta**	1940	Hampton University	Hampton, Virginia	Active	
**Pi Lambda Psi**	1940	Morgan State University	Baltimore, Maryland	Active	
**Kappa Gamma**	1940	North Carolina Central University	Durham, North Carolina	Active	
**Pi Sigma Kappa**	1940	Philander Smith College	Little Rock, Arkansas	Active	
**Alpha Pi Mu**	1940	Prairie View A&M University	Prairie View, Texas	Active	
Alpha Omicron	1940	Shaw University	Raleigh, North Carolina	Inactive	
**Zeta Phi Rho**	1940	Xavier University	New Orleans, Louisiana	Active	
**Kappa Alpha**	1941	Southern University	Baton Rouge, Louisiana	Active	
Kappa Eta	1941	Virginia Union University	Richmond, Virginia	Inactive	
**Delta Eta Sigma**	1942	Dillard University	New Orleans, Louisiana	Active	
Alpha Kappa	1942	Elizabeth City State University	Elizabeth City, North Carolina	Inactive	
**Kappa Beta**	1944	LeMoyne–Owen College	Memphis, Tennessee	Active	
Kappa Theta	1944	Clark Atlanta University	Atlanta, Georgia	Inactive	
**Kappa Iota**	1944	Florida A&M University	Tallahassee, Florida	Active	
Kappa Kappa	1945	Morris Brown College	Atlanta, Georgia	Inactive	
Kappa Lambda	1945	Wilberforce University	Wilberforce, Ohio	Inactive	
Kappa Mu	1945	Wiley College	Marshall, Texas	Inactive	
**Kappa Nu**	1945	Kentucky State University	Frankfort, Kentucky	Active	
Kappa Xi	1945–1952	Huston–Tillotson University	Austin, Texas	Inactive	
Kappa Omicron	1947	Alabama State University	Montgomery, Alabama	Inactive	
Kappa Pi	1947	Benedict College	Columbia, South Carolina	Inactive	
**Kappa Rho**	1947	Paine College	Augusta, Georgia	Active	
**Kappa Sigma**	1948	Alabama A&M University	Normal, Alabama	Active	
**Kappa Tau**	1948	Central State University	Wilberforce, Ohio	Active	
**Kappa Upsilon**	1949	Alcorn State University	Lorman, Mississippi	Active	
**Kappa Phi**	1949	Jackson State University	Jackson, Mississippi	Active	
Kappa Chi	1949	Allen University	Columbia, South Carolina	Inactive	
**Kappa Omega**	1950	Bethune-Cookman University	Daytona Beach, Florida	Active	
Kappa Zeta	1950	Grambling State University	Grambling, Louisiana	Inactive	
Kappa Psi		South Carolina State University	Orangeburg, South Carolina	Inactive	
**Alpha Alpha**	1950	St. Augustine's University	Raleigh, North Carolina	Active	
Alpha Beta	1950	Texas Southern University	Houston, Texas	Inactive	
Alpha Gamma	1950	Lincoln University	Jefferson City, Missouri	Inactive	
**Kappa Epsilon**	1950	Winston-Salem State University	Winston-Salem, North Carolina	Active	
Alpha Delta	1951	Texas College	Tyler, Texas	Inactive	
Alpha Zeta	1951	Bishop College	Marshall, Texas	Inactive	
Alpha Eta	1951	Virginia State University	Ettrick, Virginia	Inactive	
**Alpha Theta**	1951	Claflin University	Orangeburg, South Carolina	Active	
**Alpha Iota**	1952	Albany State University	Albany, Georgia	Active	
**Alpha Mu**	1952	Fort Valley State University	Fort Valley, Georgia	Active	
**Alpha Nu**	1952	Savannah State University	Savannah, Georgia	Active	
Alpha Xi	1953	Jarvis Christian College	Hawkins, Texas	Inactive	
Alpha Pi	1954	Saint Paul's College	Lawrenceville, Virginia	Inactive	
**Alpha Rho**	1954	Tougaloo College	Tougaloo, Mississippi	Active	
Alpha Tau	1954	Barber–Scotia College	Concord, North Carolina	Inactive	
Alpha Phi	1954	Florida Memorial University	Miami Gardens, Florida	Inactive	
Alpha Lambda	1955	University of Maryland Eastern Shore	Princess Anne, Maryland	Inactive	
Alpha Sigma	1956	Miles College	Birmingham, Alabama	Inactive	
**Alpha Upsilon**	1956	Stillman College	Tuscaloosa, Alabama	Active	
Alpha Chi	1957	Langston University	Langston, Oklahoma	Inactive	
**Alpha Psi**	1962	Livingstone College	Salisbury, North Carolina	Active	
Alpha Omega	1962	Lane College	Jackson, Tennessee	Inactive	
**Mu Alpha**	1963	Delaware State University	Dover, Delaware	Active	
**Mu Beta**	1963	Coppin State University	Baltimore, Maryland	Active	
Mu Gamma	1965	Bowie State University	Bowie, Maryland	Inactive	
Mu Delta	1969	Mississippi Valley State University	Itta Bena, Mississippi	Inactive	
**Mu Epsilon**	1969	Voorhees University	Denmark, South Carolina	Active	
**Mu Epsilon** ?		Grand View University	Des Moines, Iowa	Active	
Mu Zeta	1970	Norfolk State University	Norfolk, Virginia	Inactive	
Mu Eta	1973	Cheyney University of Pennsylvania	Cheyney, Pennsylvania	Inactive	
**Mu Theta**	1975	Rust College	Holly Springs, Mississippi	Active	
Mu Iota	1975	Paul Quinn College	Dallas, Texas	Inactive	
**Mu Lambda**		Morris College	Sumter, South Carolina	Active	
Mu Kappa	1976	University of Southern Mississippi	Hattiesburg, Mississippi	Inactive	
Mu Mu		Kent State University	Kent, Ohio	Inactive	
**Mu Nu**		Cleveland State University	Cleveland, Ohio	Active	
Mu Xi		Ohio State University	Columbus, Ohio	Inactive	
**Mu Omicron**		Western Michigan University	Kalamazoo, Michigan	Active	
Mu Pi		Virginia Tech	Blacksburg, Virginia	Inactive	
Mu Rho		Youngstown State University	Youngstown, Ohio	Inactive	
Mu Sigma		Texas A&M University–Central Texas	Killeen, Texas	Inactive	
Mu Tau		Concordia College Alabama	Selma, Alabama	Inactive	
**Mu Phi**		Edward Waters University	Jacksonville, Florida	Active	

== See also ==
- Honor society
- Honor cords
