= Fred Gainous =

American academic administrator

9th President of Florida A&M University
- In office 2002–2004
- Preceded by: Henry Lewis III, Frederick S. Humphries
- Succeeded by: Castell V. Bryant, James H. Ammons

Personal details
- Born: Fred Jerome Gainous; July 6, 1947 (age 79) Tallahassee, Florida, U.S.
- Children: 3
- Education: Florida A&M University (BS); University of Florida (graduate)

Fred Jerome Gainous (born July 6, 1947) is an American academic administrator. He was the 9th president of Florida A&M University, serving from 2002 until 2004. He also served as chancellor of Alabama's community college system from 1988 until 2002.

== Early life and education ==
Gainous was born on July 6, 1947 in Tallahassee, Florida, where he grew up in the Frenchtown neighborhood and attended Lincoln High School.

After high school, Gainous attended Florida A&M University, paying for his education by working as a janitor at the university library and a doctor's home. Gainous graduated from Florida A&M in 1969 with a bachelor's degree in agricultural education. After two years teaching high school, he enrolled in graduate school at the University of Florida College of Agricultural and Life Sciences and completed a master's degree in agricultural education in 1972. In 1975, Gainous completed an Ed.D. at the University of Florida College of Education with a thesis titled The role of the county adult education administrator in Florida.

== Career ==
From 1985 to 1987, Gainous an associate commissioner at the Kansas State Department of Education. Then from 1987 to 1988, Gainous was an associate vice president at St. Petersburg College.

Gainous served as the chancellor of the Alabama Department of Postsecondary Education (overseeing the Alabama Community College System) from 1988 to 2002. Gainous returned to Florida A&M University in the role of university president in 2002. However, Florida A&M experienced financial struggles under his presidency such as a $1.8 million deficit, employees criminally charged with theft, and late financial aid payments to students. On September 28, 2004, the Florida A&M board of trustees voted 8–4 to fire Gainous after year's end, citing mismanagement of school finances and the move of the Florida A&M Rattlers football team to NCAA Division I-A, among other problems.
