= George W. Gore =

President of Florida A & M University

Dr. George W Gore
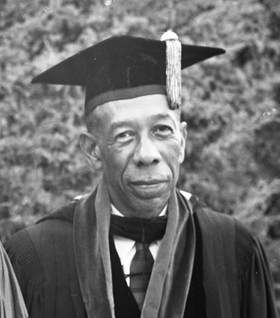
- Gore in 1968

President of Florida A & M University
- In office 1950–1968
- Preceded by: H. Manning Efferson
- Succeeded by: Benjamin L. Perry, Jr.

Personal details
- Born: July 11, 1901 Nashville, Tennessee
- Died: September 13, 1982 (aged 81) Nashville, Tennessee
- Education: DePauw, Harvard, Columbia

George William Gore (July 11, 1901- September 13, 1982) was President of Florida A & M University from 1950 to 1968, FAMU's second longest serving president after John Robert Edward Lee. He oversaw the institution's transition from Florida A&M College (FAMCEE) to Florida A&M University and resisted an encouraged merge with Florida State University. The Gore Education Complex at FAMU, and the nearby street, Gore Avenue, are named for him.

Gore received a bachelor's degree in English and journalism from DePauw. He then earned a master's from Harvard and A Ph.D. from Columbia. He joined the faculty of Tennessee A&I as a journalism instructor and later spent 23 years as dean before coming to FAMU. While at Tennessee he conceived of the idea of Alpha Kappa Mu honor society.

== Personal life ==
Gore was born in Nashville, Tennessee, in 1901. He was married to Pearl Mayo Winrow. They had one daughter, also named Pearl.
