= Marva Johnson =

American business executive

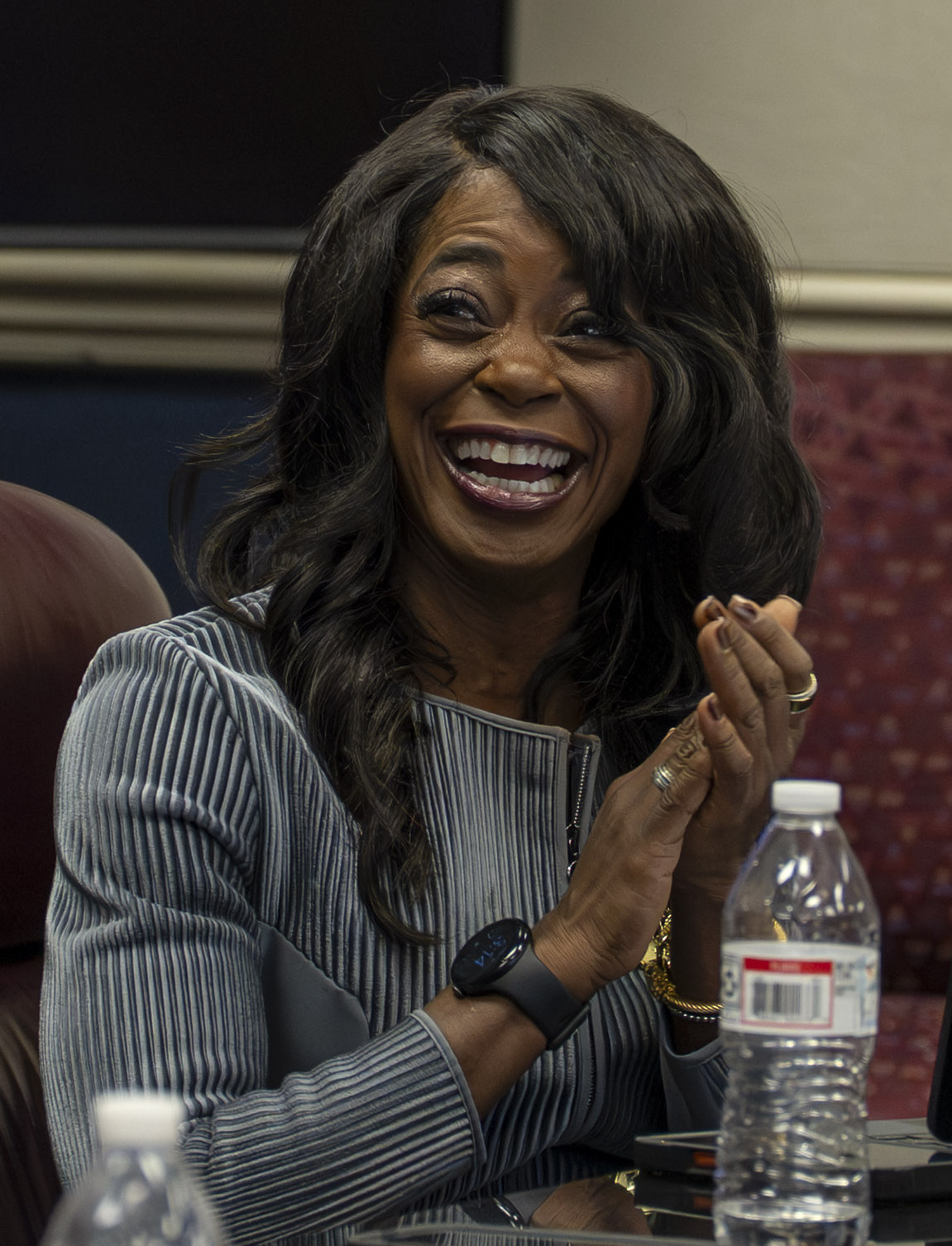

President of Florida A&M University
- Incumbent
- Assumed office May 2025
- Succeeded by: Timothy L. Beard (interim)

Personal details
- Education: Georgetown University (BS); Emory University (MBA); Georgia State University (JD)

Marva Johnson is an American business executive and education policy official who was appointed president of Florida A&M University in May 2025. She previously served as chair of the Florida Board of Education from 2015 to 2017 and held roles in the cable and telecommunications industry, as well as several appointed positions under Florida governors Rick Scott and Ron DeSantis.

== Early life and education ==
Johnson was raised in Tampa Bay. She earned a B.S. in business administration from Georgetown University. She completed a M.B.A. at Emory University Goizueta Business School. Johnson earned a J.D. from Georgia State University College of Law. She is a member of Alpha Kappa Alpha.

== Career ==
Florida governor Rick Scott appointed Johnson to the Florida Board of Education (SBE) for a term beginning March 26, 2014, and ending December 31, 2017. At that time, she was a corporate vice president for Bright House Networks. On May 20, 2015, the SBE elected Marva Johnson as its next chair. She succeeded chair Gary Chartrand. Johnson spent eight years on board.

In 2017, Johnson served on the Florida Constitution Revision Commission. She proposed an amendment that sought to exempt educational programs from the constitutional prohibition against using state money in support of religious activities and institutions. Johnson specified that public funds should be used for private schools "in the event that a student's right to an education that meets his or her individual needs and learning differences" as provided in another section that she had recommended. That recommended section stated a public school student is entitled to "an education that meets individual needs and learning differences and to use public funding to attend a non-public school if those needs and differences cannot be completely met and accommodated by the student's zoned public school."

Johnson has held appointed positions under both the Rick Scott and Ron DeSantis administrations. She served as a co-chair on one of DeSantis' transition committees.

As of July 2, 2020, Johnson was a government affairs consultant for Charter Communications. By May 2025, she was serving as group vice president of the internet and cable TV at Charter. As of July 2, 2020, Johnson also served on the Enterprise Florida Board. The Jacksonville 2020 Host Committee announced on Thursday, July 2, 2020, that Marva Johnson would be joining the larger committee to help with planning the Republican National Convention.

On May 16, 2025, Florida A&M University's Board of Trustees voted 8 to 4 to hire Johnson as president. Her appointment as president of Florida A&M University is subject to confirmation by the Florida Board of Governors. She is the second woman in university history to be named president of FAMU. Johnson succeeds Larry Robinson, who led the university from 2017 to 2024 and resigned.

== Personal life ==
Johnson lives in Winter Park, Florida. In 2015, Johnson was a member of the National Board of Women in Cable and Telecommunications. She is a member of the advisory board for Rollins College's Crummer Center for Leadership Development. Johnson was a member of the African American Women Technology Caucus. She has mentored for Bright House Networks Women's Leadership Circle.
