= Florida Board of Education =

Government agency in Florida

The Florida Board of Education, also known as the State Board of Education (SBE), is a committee composed of members appointed by the Florida governor to guide and direct the public K-12, community college and state college education in the U.S. state of Florida.

== History ==
From Reconstruction through 2002, the commissioner of education had been a Cabinet-level position, elected by the people and directly responsible for public education in Florida. The 1998 Constitutional Revision Commission proposed a rewrite of Article IV, Section IV of the Florida Constitution that reduced the Florida Cabinet from six elected officials to three. The voters approved the changes and it became effective January 7, 2003. The Florida commissioner of education became an appointed position and the Florida Department of Education became the overall responsibility of the governor. The revised constitution also created a new Florida Board of Education with seven members (one of whom is the commissioner of education), appointed by the governor. The Florida commissioner of education manages the day-to-day operations of the FLDOE. The current commissioner is Anastasios "Stasi" Kamoutsas, appointed by Governor Ron DeSantis on June 3, 2025.

== Meetings ==
The Florida Board of Education meets at least bi-monthly in Tallahassee; more often if issues require it. Public hearings are also held periodically at locations throughout the state.

== Controversial regulations ==
In 2021 the Florida Board of Education prohibited teaching about critical race theory or the 1619 Project in public schools.

In April 2023, the Board of Education extended the Florida Parental Rights in Education Act, often called the "Don't Say Gay" Act, from covering kindergarten to third grade students into covering the entire range of kindergarten to twelfth grade. The regulation forbids teachers from discussing topics of sexual orientation and gender identity, except as part of reproductive health courses. The Board clarified that they did not believe that even their exception on health classes would come up frequently, as Chancellor Paul Burns said that "abstinence is the required expectation of what we teach in our schools".

In July 2023, the Board of Education approved a Social Studies curriculum with lessons on how "slaves developed skills" that could be used for "personal benefit." Vice President Kamala Harris traveled to Jacksonville where she denounced the curriculum as whitewashing slavery and urged Floridians to "fight back" against "extremists in Florida who want to erase our full history and censor our truths." Two members of the work group who established the curriculum standards countered by saying the curriculum provides "comprehensive and rigorous instruction on African American History."

In the wake of the assassination of Charlie Kirk, Education Commissioner Anastasios Kamoutsas threatened to investigate and fire any teacher that posted comments celebrating Kirk's assassination.

== Members ==
Name	Position	Occupation	First Confirmed	Current Term Begins	Current Term Ends
Ben Gibson	Chair	Partner, Shutts & Bowen, Tallahassee	March 8, 2018	07/14/2017	12/31/2024
Ryan Petty	Vice Chair	Technology executive, parent of Parkland high school shooting victim	March 13, 2020	01/21/2020	12/31/2022
Esther Byrd	Member	United States Marine Corps veteran, wife of Secretary of State of Florida Cord Byrd	Unconfirmed	03/11/2022	TBA
Dr. Grazie Pozo Christie	Member	Radiologist, columnist for Angelus (magazine)	Unconfirmed	03/11/2022	TBA
Daniel P. Foganholi, Sr.	Member	Former Broward County Public Schools board member			
Kelly Garcia	Member	Teach For America alumna, education policy expert formerly with StudentsFirst			
MaryLynn Magar	Member	Healthcare executive, former member of Florida House of Representatives			

== Former members ==
Name	Occupation	First Confirmed	Term Ended
Thomas R. Grady	Insurance executive, former state Rep.	March 8, 2016	12/31/2022
Marva Johnson	President, Florida A&M University	April 29, 2014	12/31/2021
Andy Tuck	Citrus farmer, Highlands County	April 3, 2014	12/31/2021
Gary Chartrand	business executive	2011	12/31/2014
Roberto Martinez			12/31/2012
Sally Bradshaw	political consultant	2011	October 2013 (resigned)
John A. Colon			12/31/2014
Barbara S. Feingold			12/31/2014
John R. Padget			12/31/2012
Kathleen Shanahan			12/31/2013
Akshay K. Desai			12/31/2013 (resigned early)
T. Willard Fair			2010
Roberto Martinez			2008
Phoebe Raulerson			2008
Kathleen Shanahan			2009
Linda Taylor			2009

== See also ==
- Florida Department of Education
- State University System
- Florida College System
