= Frederick S. Humphries =

American chemist (1935–2021)

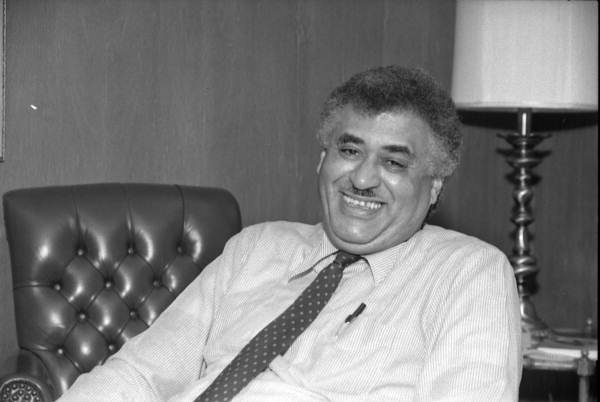
- Humphries at FAMU

8th President of Florida A & M University
- In office June 1, 1985 – December 31, 2001
- Preceded by: Walter L. Smith
- Succeeded by: Henry Lewis III, Fred Gainous

4th President of Tennessee State University
- In office 1974–1985
- Preceded by: Charles B. Fancher
- Succeeded by: Roy P. Peterson

Personal details
- Born: December 26, 1935 Apalachicola, Florida, U.S.
- Died: June 24, 2021 (aged 85) Orlando, Florida, U.S.
- Spouse: Antoinette McTurner
- Education: Florida A&M University
- Profession: President Emeritus of Florida A&M University

Frederick Stephen Humphries Sr. (December 26, 1935 – June 24, 2021) was an American academic administrator and chemistry professor who served as President of Tennessee State University (1974 to 1985), and President of Florida A&M University (1985 to 2001). He was also President and CEO of the National Association for Equal Opportunity in Higher Education from 2001 to 2003. Florida A&M University conferred the President Emeritus title upon him on December 11, 2009. He was Regent Professor at the Florida A&M University College of Law from 2003 until his retirement in 2014.

Under his leadership Florida A&M University enrollment grew from 5,100 in 1985 to 9,876 in 1993. By the 1998–1999 school year, enrollment had reached 11,828 students and by 2001 Florida A&M had an enrollment of 12,316.

He had a bachelor's degree in physical chemistry from Florida A&M University, where he graduated magna cum laude in 1957. He received a Ph.D. in physical chemistry from the University of Pittsburgh in 1964 where he was the first African American to receive a Ph.D in this discipline from the University.

== Early life ==
He was born in Apalachicola, Florida, on December 26, 1935, to Thornton Humphries and Minnie Henry, and received his early education there. A lifelong Catholic, he attended the Holy Family Catholic School and the small, all-black Wallace M. Quinn High School in Apalachicola. He was one of only nine graduates in the class of 1953. Yet, he contended that because of the quality and dedication of teachers, the small size of his school and the lack of sophisticated equipment did not handicap him. In an interview with Mike Radigan, Humphries said in Capital Outlook (May 9, 1985): "The greatest science teacher I had in high school was Mr. Charlie Watson. He taught me all my math and science courses. He was a very smart man and he cared about his students." Continuing his praise of Watson, Humphries said: "When he realized your abilities, he pushed you to the limit. When I left Wallace Quinn High School, I didn't know how well-prepared I was." Perhaps this early experience with his mathematics and science teacher instilled in him the concept of "excellence with caring" which became his motto upon becoming FAMU's eighth president. At FAMU he earned the bachelor of science degree magna cum laude in chemistry in 1957. He was also a distinguished military science graduate in 1957 and was reported to be the first black officer to be commissioned into the Army Security Agency (Army Intelligence Branch). After serving in the Army for two years, he entered the University of Pittsburgh in 1959 as a teaching assistant in chemistry, became a graduate research fellow the next year, and earned his Ph.D. degree in physical chemistry in 1964.

== Presidency at Tennessee State University, 1974–1985 ==
The achievements of Humphries on the national level led the Tennessee Board of Regents to name him as President of Tennessee State University (TSU) in 1974, a position he held until being appointed to lead his alma mater in 1985. While at TSU he demonstrated administration skills which resulted in improved and expanded academic programs, upgraded faculty, increased enrollment and quality of students, and expanded scholarships and support activities. He fought for the rights of an historically black university which was located in the same area with an historically white university when he insisted on the predominance of TSU over the University of Tennessee at Nashville (UTN). This ultimately led to the merger of TSU and UTN, with TSU becoming the surviving institution, heralded as one of the fairest and most important desegregation decisions of the 20th century. The posture and eloquence of Humphries in court is largely held as being responsible for this decision along with the presentation of attorney Avon Williams and the efforts of the Tennesseans for Justice in Higher Education. Humphries did not initiate the court battle over merger of the two universities, but he inherited it upon becoming president of TSU in 1974. In 1968, after the University of Tennessee had announced plans to build a multimillion-dollar facility for its night school extension center in Nashville, a young black woman named Rita Sanders charged that such action would perpetuate segregation at TSU and continue the dual system of public higher education in the state. The case ended up in U.S. District Court before Judge Frank Gray in 1968 as Sanders v. Ellington, et al.

When Governor Blanton asked his reaction to merger, Humphries informed the governor that "he and his colleagues were agreeable to merger-under the Board of Regents, not the University of Tennessee trustees." Humphries and his colleagues contended, and so did Judge Gray, that "the existence and expansion of predominantly white UTN alongside the traditionally black TSU have fostered competition for white students and have thus impeded the dismantling of the dual system." The state was ordered by Judge Gray to merge the two schools into a single institution under the State Board of Regents by July 1, 1980. As a result of Judge Gray's ruling, plans were developed and implemented to merge UTN under TSU, making this the first time that a traditionally white university had been placed under the administration of a traditionally black university. In demanding a unitary system, the judge stated: "It is the purpose of this order to achieve a unitary system and not achieve a merger of existing systems of higher education in Tennessee." Humphries said of this settlement: "If TSU had been a white institution, this never would have happened. UT would not have been invited in here to set up a separate institution. But now that the judge has ordered a merger, I think it is important for this traditionally black university to have the full opportunity to develop into a major university serving the entire community."

Between 1980 and 1985, Humphries and his staff gave leadership to the merged TSU and provided for UTN and began serving an increasingly larger portion of the Nashville community. As Humphries progressed up the leadership ladder and proved himself as a national fighter for HBCUs and for enhanced opportunities for minorities in higher education, he was increasingly invited to membership on boards, commissions, committees and other influential groups at the state, regional and national levels. With a stern focus on improved education for minorities, he served as External Evaluator of Title III Programs; Minority Representative in Graduate Schools Special Academy of Science; as a member of the Planning Committee of the United Negro College Fund Pre-Medical Program, Fisk University; as a member of the Special Committee on Minority Participation in Graduate and Professional Education; and Chairman of the State Board of Education Advisory Committee on the Education of Blacks in Florida.

== The Florida A&M University years, 1985–2001 ==
Humphries was eighth President of Florida A&M University from June 1, 1985, to December 31, 2001. He was originally expected to depart June 30, 2001. Under his motto of "Excellence with Caring", he worked with administrators, faculty, students, alumni, the corporate world, and other supporters of FAMU. As a result, under the Humphries administration, FAMU continuously improved its image and gained increasing recognition on the state, national, and international levels.

As a dedicated alumnus of FAMU, one of President Humphries' major goals was to increase student enrollment at all levels with high-achieving, quality students. Over his sixteen-year tenure, the enrollment at FAMU more than doubled from 5,101 in 1985, to 12,257 in 2000, with an average SAT score of 1028, and an average ACT score of 20. During the same period, FAMU attracted 657 National Achievement Scholars and surpassed such universities as Harvard, Yale and Stanford to lead the nation in numbers of National Achievement Scholars in 1992, 1995, and 1997, tying with Harvard in 2000. The focus on high-achieving students led to a tenfold increase in science and engineering students, with a corresponding increase at the master's degree level. Doctoral degree programs increased from one in 1985 to ten in 2000.

Along with the increases in the quantity and quality of FAMU students, the faculty was significantly upgraded, and academic programs were expanded and diversified. In addition to conducting effective classroom teaching and research, the Faculty was inspired and motivated to increase external funding from both the public and private sectors. The Division of Sponsored Research witnessed an increase in contracts and grants from $8.5 million in 1985 to $46 million in 2000. From the private sector, the FAMU Foundation, Incorporated showed a fund balance of only $6.2 million in 1986, but by 2000, the fund balance had reached $62.5 million. The FAMU Industry Cluster (comprising 152 major corporations) and the Life-Gets-Better Scholarship program, sponsored by select members of the Cluster are firm indications of corporate America's respect for FAMU's educational leadership and graduates of its academic programs. From 1989 to 2000 FAMU provided 873 Life-Gets-Better Scholarships to outstanding minority students majoring in such disciplines as Engineering, Physical, Life, Natural, and Computer Sciences and Pre-Law. In an effort to provide the appropriate facilities for educational programs and activities to flourish, President Humphries worked assiduously with his administrators, faculty, and staff to lead one of the most successful building programs in the history of the University. During his tenure, there were 51 facilities planned, designed, constructed, renovated or acquired between 1985 and 2000 at a grand total of $256,922,556. In 1985, FAMU's operating budget was only $59,940,563, but by 2000, it had grown to $249,951,788, an increase of 416 percent.

Under the Humphries administration, FAMU was selected as "College of the Year" by the TIME/Princeton Review in 1997, and recognized in the State University System as a Comprehensive/Doctoral University in 1999. With a broadened institutional mission emphasizing graduate studies and international affairs, the University can now offer additional masters and doctoral degree programs, and focus on a global perspective in many of its programs. Distance learning has become a major focus as FAMU expands its services and academic influence throughout the state and nation and on the international scenes.

Upon appointing Humphries as the eighth president of FAMU, the BOR challenged him to improve faculty morale and upgrade the faculty; effect sounder fiscal policies; increase student enrollment at all levels with quality students; expand, upgrade, and diversify academic programs; and increase extramural funding from both the public and private sectors.

For nearly four years he taught effectively at his alma mater and became totally involved in the academic, political and social life of the University. In 1965-66 Humphries was also an active and influential member of the FAMU Chapter of the American Association of University Professors (AAUP). In the late 1960s FAMU was literally fighting for its life as a separate and autonomous university. Each legislative session would bring serious efforts by legislators to merge FAMU and FSU, presumably as a cost-cutting measure. Then State Senator Bob Graham of Miami and other urban senators from the central and southern sections of Florida were among the strongest proponents of merger. When a report from the Southern Regional Educational Board (SREB) was submitted to the faculty in 1968 by Lionel Newsome, a former professor at Southern University, it appeared to support the legislative concept of merger. Gore called a meeting of the Faculty Senate to discuss ways and means to counteract the merger emphasis. In the aftermath of that meeting, the FAMU Chapter of the American Association of University Professors (AAUP), with Howard E. Lewis serving as president, called a meeting to voice its objection to any consideration of merger.

As an outcome of that meeting, the members drew up a resolution stipulating that FAMU must remain a separate and autonomous university within the State University System. A decision was also made at that meeting to seek the endorsement of this resolution at the statewide meeting of the Florida AAUP. Because of the politically and racially volatile climate at the time, it was difficult to find professors who were willing to fight openly for the cause. Howard E. Lewis and Leedell W. Neyland, a past president of FAMU's Chapter of AAUP, persuaded Frederick S. Humphries and Ralph W. Turner to present and fight for the passage of the resolution at the statewide AAUP meeting in Gainesville. According to Turner, "Humphries made a very emotional and forceful presentation which had even the most conservative members listening attentively." After the presentation Humphries and Turner were pleasantly surprised to see that the group voted almost unanimously for the resolution. This endorsement, which placed professors on the statewide level in support of FAMU's autonomy, also had a significant effect on the selected legislators. Shortly thereafter, Senator Graham reversed his position on merger and became an advocate for a separate and autonomous FAMU. This early display of courage contributed to the perception of Humphries as an aggressive leader who would fight for the survival and growth of FAMU, his alma mater.

Because of Humphries' potential for academic leadership, President Gore selected him to coordinate a select group of FAMU faculty members who participated in a consortium known as the Thirteen College Curriculum Program (TCCP) meeting at the Pine Manor Junior College in Chestnut Hill, Massachusetts, during the summer of 1967. His efficient and highly astute management of the TCCP project demonstrated to FAMU and to others that he was destined to become an outstanding leader in higher education. Under his leadership, FAMU was named as one of the model projects among the colleges and universities which made up TCCP. In 1968, Humphries joined the staff of the Institute for Services to Education, Incorporated (ISE) in Washington, D. C., an umbrella agency which coordinated a variety of educational programs for minority and disadvantaged students at the college level. Between 1968 and 1974, he held the following directorships while providing leadership for ISE: Summer Conferences, Innovative Institutional Research Consortium, Knoxville College Study of Science Capability of Black Colleges, Interdisciplinary Programs, and two Universities Graduate Programs in Humanities. While holding most of these directorships, Humphries became the Vice President of ISE from 1970 to 1974, and was deeply involved in developing innovative and creative educational materials and procedures designed to improve the educational levels of minorities in higher education. These years of leadership in developmental education for minorities caused him to become a national advocate of good teaching and academic advisement as essentials for the educational growth and development of students. Under Humphries' leadership, the TCCP, one of the most comprehensive and successful programs in higher education for disadvantaged students, grew from 13 to 40 in historically black colleges and universities (HBCUs) and from 1,250 to over 20,000 students. The programs he directed led to the establishment of institutional research offices, computer-assisted instruction (long before it was fashionable), interdisciplinary courses, and advanced management practices at many of these HBCUs. He also pioneered special consortial arrangements with major universities such as the University of Massachusetts, University of Pittsburgh, Carnegie-Mellon University, American University and others to permit junior faculty members and graduates to study for the doctorate.

Outside the arena of formal education, Humphries' influence was felt in both the public and private sectors. Over the years he held significant leadership positions on boards, commissions, and committees designed to uplift various segments of our society. These include: chairman, board of directors of the National Association of State Universities and Land-Grant Colleges; member of the board of trustees, University of Pittsburgh; member of the board of directors of Wal-Mart, Inc.; member of the board of directors of Brinker International; member of the board of directors of the Oak Ridge Associates Universities; member of the National Study Panel on Big Science, National Academy of Science; United States Department of Agriculture Task Force on 1890 Land-Grant Institutions; the Division of National Science Foundation; the board of directors, Barnett Bank in Tallahassee; the. board of directors, National Merit Scholarship Corporation; the Apalachicola Bay Resources Planning and Management Committee; and many others.

== Awards and honors ==
His awards and honors include: the Drum Major for Justice Award in Education by the Southern Christian Leadership Conference; President's Award for Excellence in Higher Education by 100 Black Men in America, Inc.; Leadership Grant by the Prudential Life Insurance Company of America Foundation; Certificate of Appreciation by the Governor of Tennessee; Certificate of Appreciation by the U. S. Department of Health and Human Services, Office of Human Development Services; and many others. Among Humphries' most memorable awards are the Distinguished Alumnus Award presented by the faculty of the College of Arts and Sciences of the University of Pittsburgh in 1986; the United Bicentennial Medal of Distinction by the University of Pittsburgh on its 200th anniversary; and the Thurgood Marshall Educational Achievement Award by Johnson Publishing Company for the most outstanding contributions to education. In 1998, the Orlando Sentinel named him "Floridian of the Year," the first black person to be honored with this award.

As an academic leader and astute administrator, Humphries has consistently shared his gifts and talents with others through publications, consultantships, and the evaluation of the accreditation process for universities and colleges. Through more than fifteen articles, dozens of scholarly speeches, and numerous evaluative and consultative services to educational institutions, he has significantly influenced educational development throughout America. A strong proponent of the land-grant idea in education for minorities, Humphries shared his ideas with the nation in the lead article, "1890 Land-Grant Institutions: Their Struggle for Survival and Equality," published in the Spring 1991 issue of Agricultural History. Also, his article on "Black Colleges -- A National Resource for the Training of Minority Scientific and Engineering Manpower," which was presented to the American Association for the Advancement of Science in 1978, became a guideline for the implementation of science and engineering emphasis at FAMU. Humphries spoke passionately for the worth of HBCUs whether he was before the U. S. Congress or in an inner-city church in Miami or Tampa. While President, Humphries retained active membership in professional organizations, even though his demanding administrative duties and responsibilities made classroom teaching and research almost impossible. He was a member of the American Association of Higher Education, the American Association for the Advancement of Science, the American Chemical Society, and the American Association of Minority Research Universities. On the civic and community fronts he held membership in the NAACP and served on the board of directors of the YMCA, the Tallahassee Urban League, and many others.

== Personal life ==
Humphries was a member of the Alpha Phi Alpha fraternity, and the Sigma Pi Phi fraternity. Throughout his professional and administrative life he was supported by his devoted wife, Antoinette McTurner Humphries, a native of Pittsburgh, Pennsylvania. She obtained a B. S. degree in sociology and political science from Tennessee State University. In addition to hosting annual celebrations at graduation exercises, the Industry Cluster, and various educational and political groups that visit the campus, Mrs. Humphries participated in many community activities. Annually, she sponsored a Christmas Toys for Tots Drive; hosted local elementary schools in tours of the President's residence and the campus; hosted teas with Miss FAMU and court; hosted Bar-B-Que for student athletes; and provided scholarships for third-year theater majors at the "Toni" Awards program. She further promoted the fine arts at Rickards High School through the Friends of Rickards program with an annual art showing. She also held membership in The Links, Incorporated, The Girlfriends, and the Delta Sigma Theta sorority.

Although she involved herself with the economic and social development of many students, her primary emphasis was on nurturing her own three children and steering them toward success. She died on March 16, 2006, at the age of 64.

Frederick S. Humphries died June 24, 2021, at the age of 85.
