= Wallace M. Quinn High School =

Defunct school in Florida, United States

Quinn High School was an all-black school in Apalachicola, Florida. Located at the end of 8th Street at Avenue M, the school was closed in 1967 under the leadership of Willie Speed, who later became the first Black school board chairman in the county.

The school was built in the late 1940s on land donated by Wallace Quinn. While the two white high schools in the district got new textbooks and taught algebra and science classes, Quinn received second-hand textbooks and was told that Black children could only handle very basic material. Under the tutelage of Charlie Watson, the school reported one curriculum to the school district, while teaching a more advanced curriculum outside the eye of White administrators.

== Notable alumni ==
Frederick S. Humphries, President of Tennessee State University and Florida A&M University
