= Ryan Petty =

American activist

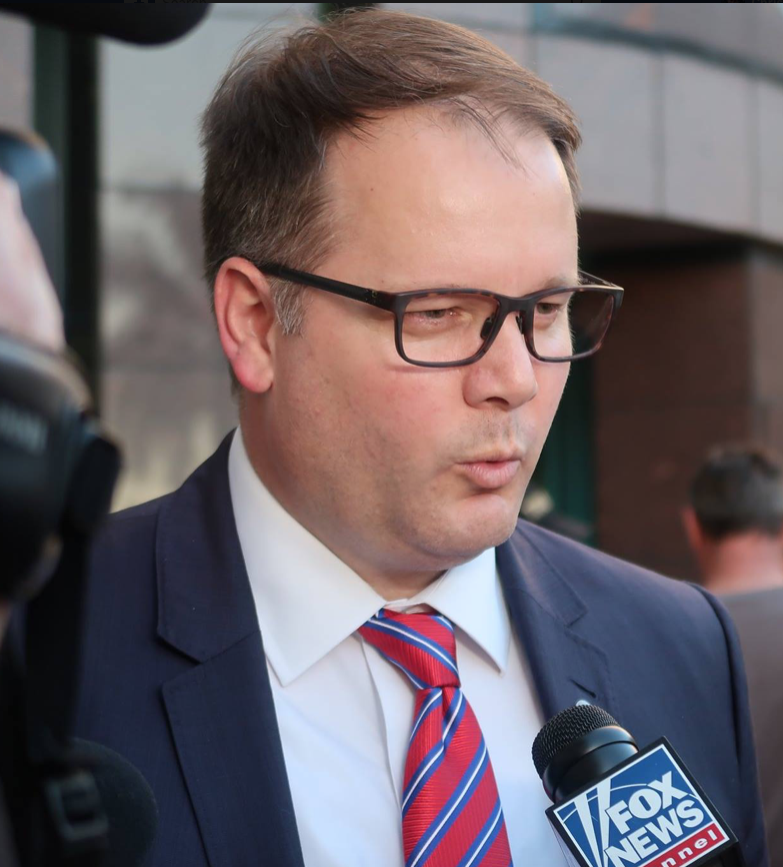
- Petty in 2019
- Born: January 15, 1970 (age 56)
- Education: Brigham Young University
- Organization: The WalkUp Foundation
- Political party: Republican
- Children: 4, including Alaina Petty
- Website: ryanpetty.com

Ryan Blaine Petty (born January 15, 1970) is an American school safety activist. His 14-year-old daughter Alaina Petty was murdered in the Stoneman Douglas High School shooting on February 14, 2018. Petty is credited with helping to pass the "Marjory Stoneman Douglas High School Public Safety Act" Florida Senate Bill 7026 just three weeks after his daughter Alaina was murdered. At the federal level, Petty worked with Senators Orrin Hatch, Marco Rubio and Bill Nelson to pass the STOP School Violence Act and the Fix NICS Act of 2017. He has met frequently with former Florida governor Rick Scott, and many federal lawmakers.

== Political activism and career ==
Ryan Petty ran for Broward County School Board in 2018, narrowly losing in the primary to incumbent Donna Korn. Petty was endorsed by two sitting U.S. Senators Orrin Hatch and Marco Rubio, unusual for a local school board race. Senator Rubio credited Petty for his work to improve school safety and his help in passing the STOP School Violence Act. Governor-elect of Florida Ron DeSantis, a Republican, included Petty on his Transition Advisory Committee on Public Safety. In January 2020, Petty was appointed by Governor Ron DeSantis to the Florida State Board of Education. Petty was confirmed by the Florida Senate in March 2020 in a 23-16 vote along party lines. As of 2026, Petty is chair of the State Board of Education.

== Activism ==
In February 2018, Ryan and his son Patrick Petty accompanied Governor Rick Scott to Tallahassee to speak to the Florida House and Senate about the impact to their family of the Stoneman Douglas High School shooting and the need for legislative reform targeted at improving school safety. Petty spoke to both chambers asking them to set aside political differences to make our schools safe. "If this evolves into a gun control debate, we are going to miss our opportunity to get something done," Petty said. "[The] message is simple, this time must be different we have an opportunity to get our schools secure." Petty has been praised for his ability to work across the aisle to tackle the issue of school shootings in the United States, meeting with lawmakers and other officials in Florida and Washington, D.C.

In April 2018, Petty and his wife Kelly launched a nonprofit organization, The WalkUp Foundation; which is dedicated to improving the culture in our public schools by funding programs that influence engagement within the student body. The WalkUp Foundation also funds early identification & threat assessment programs, which has been demonstrated to help prevent acts of school violence. In partnership with the U.S. Secret Service and The Columbia Lighthouse Project at Columbia University, The WalkUp Foundation is working to ensure that school districts are equipped with best practices and training for proactive threat assessment.
