= Shirley Kinsey =

American philanthropist and art collector

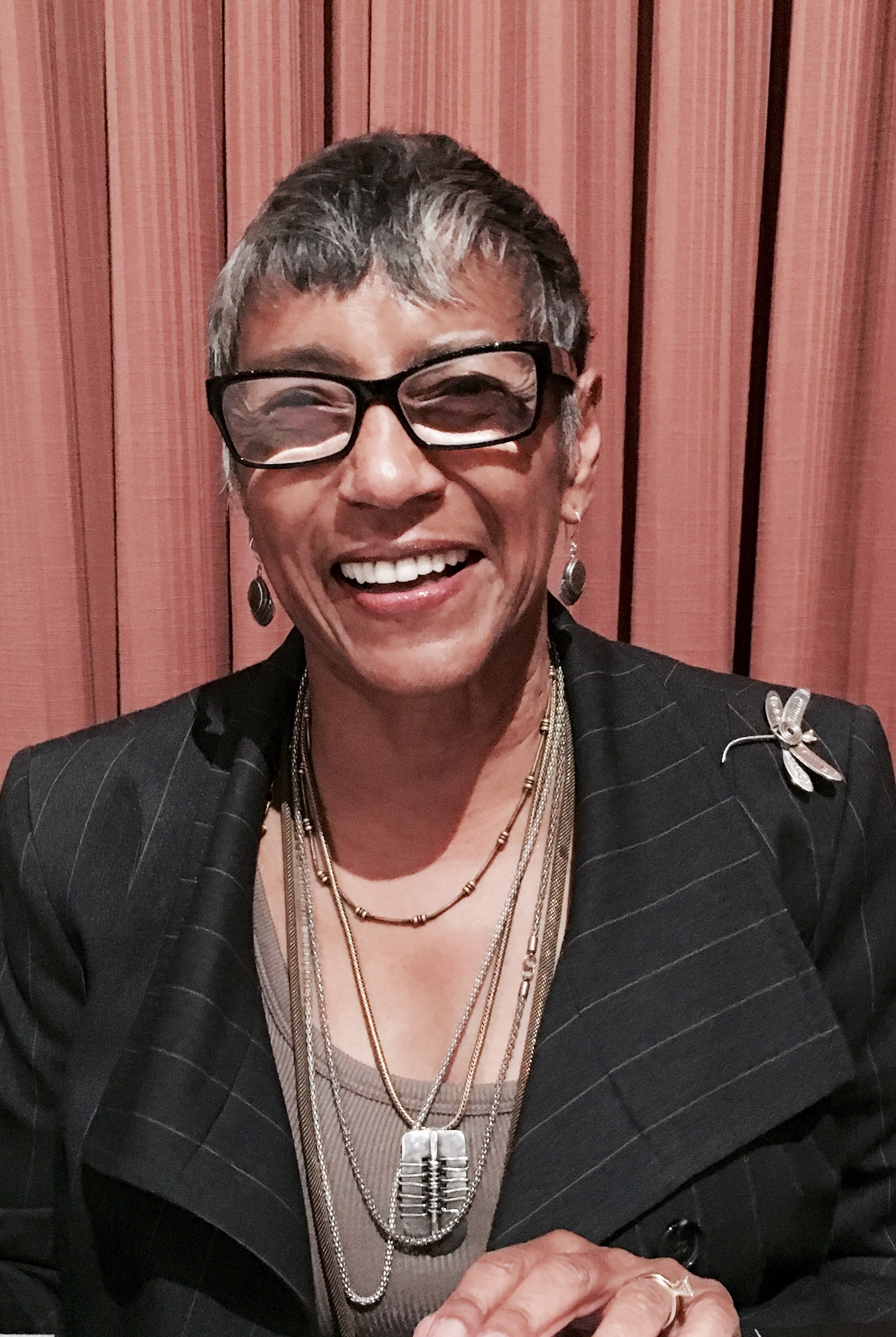
- Kinsey in 2016
- Born: February 7, 1946 (age 80); Lake City, Florida
- Education: Florida A&M University; Pepperdine University
- Spouse: Bernard Kinsey

Shirley Kinsey (née Pooler; born February 7, 1946) is an American philanthropist, art collector, and former school teacher known, along with husband Bernard and son Khalil, as the owner of Kinsey Collection, one of the largest private collections of African-American history and art in the world.

== Early life and education ==
Shirley was born to Erma and Eddie Pooler on February 7, 1946, in Lake City, Florida. She attended university at Florida A&M University, where she met Bernard Kinsey, her future husband, following her arrest at a civil rights protest. She graduated with a degree in English in 1967. Shirley and Bernard married the same year and set a goal of travelling the world together. The couple was married in Tallahassee at the First Baptist Institutional Church, followed by a reception in the faculty lounge at the university. Following graduation she was hired as a teacher with the Compton Unified School District. She later returned to school, graduating in 1976 from Pepperdine University with a master's degree in multi-cultural education.

== Kinsey African American Art & History Collection ==
Shirley and Bernard began collecting art as a way of documenting their travels. Realizing they knew little of their own history and culture, the couple began collecting African-American art, literature and manuscripts eventually amassing one of the largest private collections in the world. Their collecting expanded following the birth of their son Khalil as a way of documenting where he came from outside of narratives focused on slavery. Pieces from their collection has toured extensively across the United States since 2006. The collection was exhibited internationally for the first time in 2016 in Hong Kong. Khalil Kinsey works closely with his parents having served as chief operating officer and curator of collection and as vice president of the Bernard and Shirley Kinsey Foundation. The Kinsey family and their collection were featured on Episode 26 of the podcast This Is Love in 2020.
