= Larry Robinson (chemist) =

American chemist

12th President of Florida A&M University
- In office November 30, 2017 – August 4, 2024
- Preceded by: Elmira Mangum
- Succeeded by: Timothy L. Beard, Ph.D.

Personal details
- Born: Tennessee, U.S.
- Spouse: Sharon Robinson
- Education: University of Memphis (BA); Washington University (MA, PhD)
- Scientific career
- Fields: nuclear chemistry
- Workplaces: Oak Ridge National Laboratory; Florida A&M University; National Oceanic and Atmospheric Administration
- Thesis: Fractional Independent Yields of Silver-121 and Cadmium-121 from Thermal-Neutron Fission of Uranium-235 (1984)

Larry Robinson is an American professor and academic administrator, who served as president of Florida A&M University from 2017 to 2024.

== Career ==
Robinson, an African American, started his college education at LeMoyne-Owen College and graduated from Memphis State University now the University of Memphis, in 1979 with summa cum laude honors and a B.S. degree in chemistry. He received a Ph.D. in nuclear chemistry from Washington University in St. Louis in 1984. In that same year, he joined the research staff of Oak Ridge National Laboratory (ORNL), where he was a research scientist and served as a group leader, of the neutron activation analysis facility. He accepted a position as a visiting professor at FAMU in January 1995, and left ORNL two years later to accept a permanent faculty position at FAMU.

At FAMU, Robinson became director of the university's Environmental Sciences Institute. In addition to conducting research on environmental chemistry of coastal ecosystems, he had a leadership role in establishing new B.S. and Ph.D. degree programs. In 2003, he became FAMU provost and vice president for academic affairs, serving until 2005. In 2007 he became the university's chief operating officer and vice president for research, and served for several weeks as the school's interim president. In May 2010, he left that position to become Assistant Secretary for Conservation and Management in the National Oceanic and Atmospheric Administration. In November 2011 he returned to FAMU as a professor and special assistant, and in March 2012 he was named provost and vice president for academic affairs.

In July 2012, the FAMU Board of Trustees appointed Robinson to serve as the university's interim president, replacing James H. Ammons. On September 15, 2016, he was named to a third stint as interim university president following the approval of a separation agreement with the 11th president, Elmira Mangum. On November 30, 2017, Robinson was named the 12th President of Florida A&M University. Robinson resigned from the presidency in July 2024.

== Research ==
One of Robinson's primary research interests is environmental chemistry, including the detection of trace elements in environmental matrices by nuclear methods. In 1991, while at ORNL, Robinson was a participant in a well-publicized investigation into the cause of the death of 19th-century U.S. President Zachary Taylor. When Taylor died rather suddenly in 1850, the cause of his death was listed as gastroenteritis, but some historians thought he might have been poisoned with arsenic. His descendants gave permission for his remains to be exhumed in order to allow analysis of tiny samples of his hair and fingernails. With ORNL's High Flux Isotope Reactor as a neutron source, Robinson and colleagues used neutron activation analysis to measure arsenic levels in the samples. The analysis led to a finding that Taylor did not die from arsenic poisoning, as arsenic was not detected in the samples, indicating that arsenic concentrations were many times lower than would be expected in arsenic poisoning.
