= Elmira Mangum =

US educationalist

11th President of Florida A & M University
- In office April 1, 2014 – March 31, 2017
- Preceded by: James H. Ammons
- Succeeded by: Larry Robinson (chemist)

Personal details
- Born: Durham, North Carolina
- Education: North Carolina Central University; University of Wisconsin–Madison; University at Buffalo
- Profession: Distinguished Professor in Residence at Washington University in St. Louis; Professor, Former President of Florida A&M University; Vice President for Planning and Budget of Cornell University; Senior Associate Provost at University of North Carolina at Chapel Hill; Vice Provost at University at Buffalo; Operations Specialist at Wisconsin Geological & Natural History Survey.

Elmira Mangum (born April 10, 1953) is an American educator and retired university administrator, who served as President of Florida A&M University from 2014 to 2017. She was the 11th President of FAMU and the first woman to permanently hold the position in the 128-year history of the university. She served as President until March 2017, but was on administrative leave from September 2016 to March 2017.

== Biography ==
Elmira Mangum was born in Durham, North Carolina in 1953 to Ernest and Alice Blanche (née VanHook) Mangum. She obtained her bachelor's from North Carolina Central University and went on to receive two master's degrees in public policy and public administration, as well as a master's degree in urban and regional planning, from the University of Wisconsin–Madison. Subsequently, she earned a Ph.D. in educational leadership and policy at the University at Buffalo. She served as an associate provost at the University of North Carolina at Chapel Hill for nine years and in 2010 became the vice president for budget and planning at Cornell University.
