= Walter L. Smith (scholar) =

American academic administrator (1935–2021)

Walter Lee Smith (May 13, 1935 – November 25, 2021) was an American academic administrator who was president of Florida A&M University (FAMU), serving from 1977 until 1985. The privately owned Walter L. Smith Library has a collection and hold programs related to African American history.

== Life and career ==
Smith received a bachelor's degree from Florida A&M University and a doctorate from Florida State University.

He was an Africa-America Institute Scholar to West Africa in 1971 and studied African culture and history. He worked for the U.S. government on federal school desegregation programs and at the Kennedy Space Center developing educational curriculum for engineering assistants on the Saturn V program before becoming an administrator at Hillsborough Community College in Tampa and then Roxbury Community College in Massachusetts.

From 1995 until 2000 he was a professor at the University of Florida. He served as FAMU's seventh non-interim president from 1977 until 1985.

FAMU's campus includes the Walter L. Smith Architecture Building Florida State has a scholarship program in his honor.

The Florida State Archives have a photo of him presenting and award in 1984. In the late 1980s a video about Walter L. Smith and his accomplishments at FAMU was released. Julian Bond introduces the film.

Smith gave a presentation on race and education in Florida in 2014.

He sued FAMU President Frederick Humphries accusing him of withholding a payment over professional rivalry.

In 2009, Smith received an award from the NEA. He died in Tampa on November 25, 2021, at the age of 86.
