= Bernard Kinsey =

American philanthropist and entrepreneur

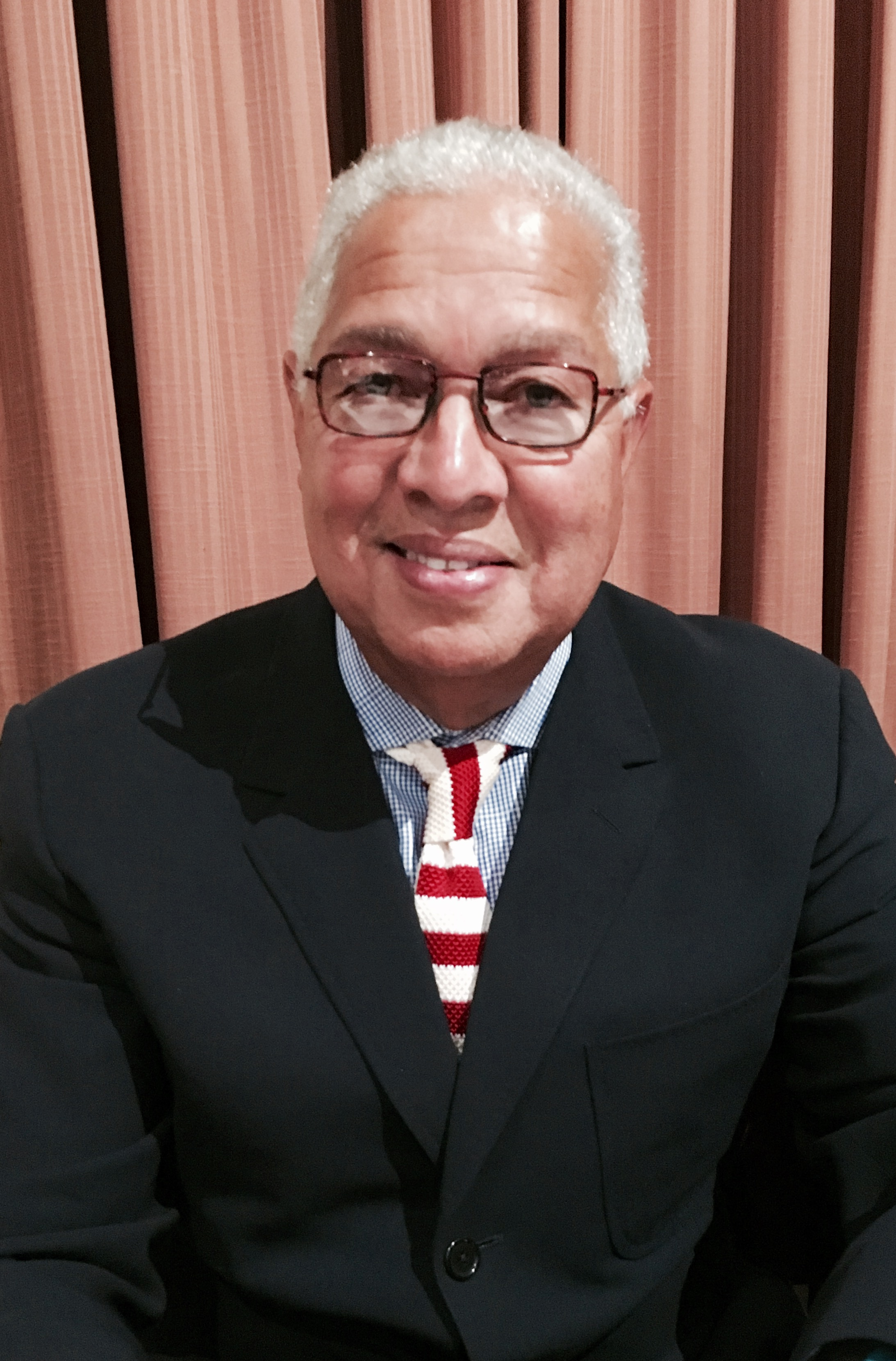
- Bernard Kinsey in 2016 in Sonoma County, California
- Born: September 20, 1943 (age 82); West Palm Beach, Florida, U.S.
- Education: Pepperdine University, Florida A&M University
- Occupations: Collector, Philanthropist
- Spouse: Shirley Kinsey
- Children: Khalil Kinsey
- Relatives: Ulysses Kinsey (father)
- Website: The Kinsey Collection

Bernard Kinsey is an American philanthropist, entrepreneur, and collector of African-American art of the 19th and 20th centuries.

== Early life and education ==
Bernard Kinsey was born and raised in West Palm Beach, Florida in Palm Beach County. He is the son of a prominent African American family from Palm Beach County, Florida. Bernard Kinsey's father is the late U.B. Kinsey who became one of the first African American principals of a public school in Palm Beach County, Florida.

Bernard Kinsey obtained an MBA from Pepperdine University and received Honorary Doctorates from Florida A&M University and Alabama A & M University. He is a member of the Omega Psi Phi fraternity. He is a member of First African Methodist Episcopal Church of Los Angeles.

== Career ==
Kinsey had a twenty-year association with the Xerox Corporation. He has also been a political commentator, international business consultant, writer, and speaker.

== Rebuild L.A. ==
In 1992, Bernard Kinsey was selected as chief operating officer and co-chairman of Rebuild L.A. under Peter Ueberroth. Rebuild L.A.'s mission was economic redevelopment because of the financial devastation that resulted from the 1992 Los Angeles riots. As Co-Chairman of Rebuild L.A., Bernard Kinsey was responsible for generating investments from the private sector for the inner city of Los Angeles, and recruit various retail businesses to the community.

== Philanthropy ==
Bernard Kinsey was a board member of the William H. Johnson Foundation for the Arts, established in 2001, from 2002-2005. The purpose of the foundation is to encourage minority artists early in their careers, by offering them financial grants. On February 6, 2006, Kinsey was honored by the Black Legacy of Giving Foundation for his work as a black leader and philanthropist in education and the arts.

== Kinsey African American Art & History Collection ==
Bernard and Shirley are known for their stewardship of art, books and manuscripts that document and tell the story of African Americans' triumphs and struggles from 1632 to present. From September 2009 through March 2010, The Kinsey Collection: Shared Treasures of Bernard and Shirley Kinsey, was on display at the Brogan Museum, in Tallahassee, Florida.

The Kinsey Collection is one of the largest private collections of artifacts tracing African-American history. It includes sculptures, paintings, and documents of historical value, among which are rarities such as a letter written by Malcolm X to Alex Haley two years before Malcolm's 1965 assassination.

== Personal life ==
Kinsey is married to Shirley Kinsey (Pooler). Their son Khalil is the general manager and curator of The Kinsey African American Art and History Collection and foundation.

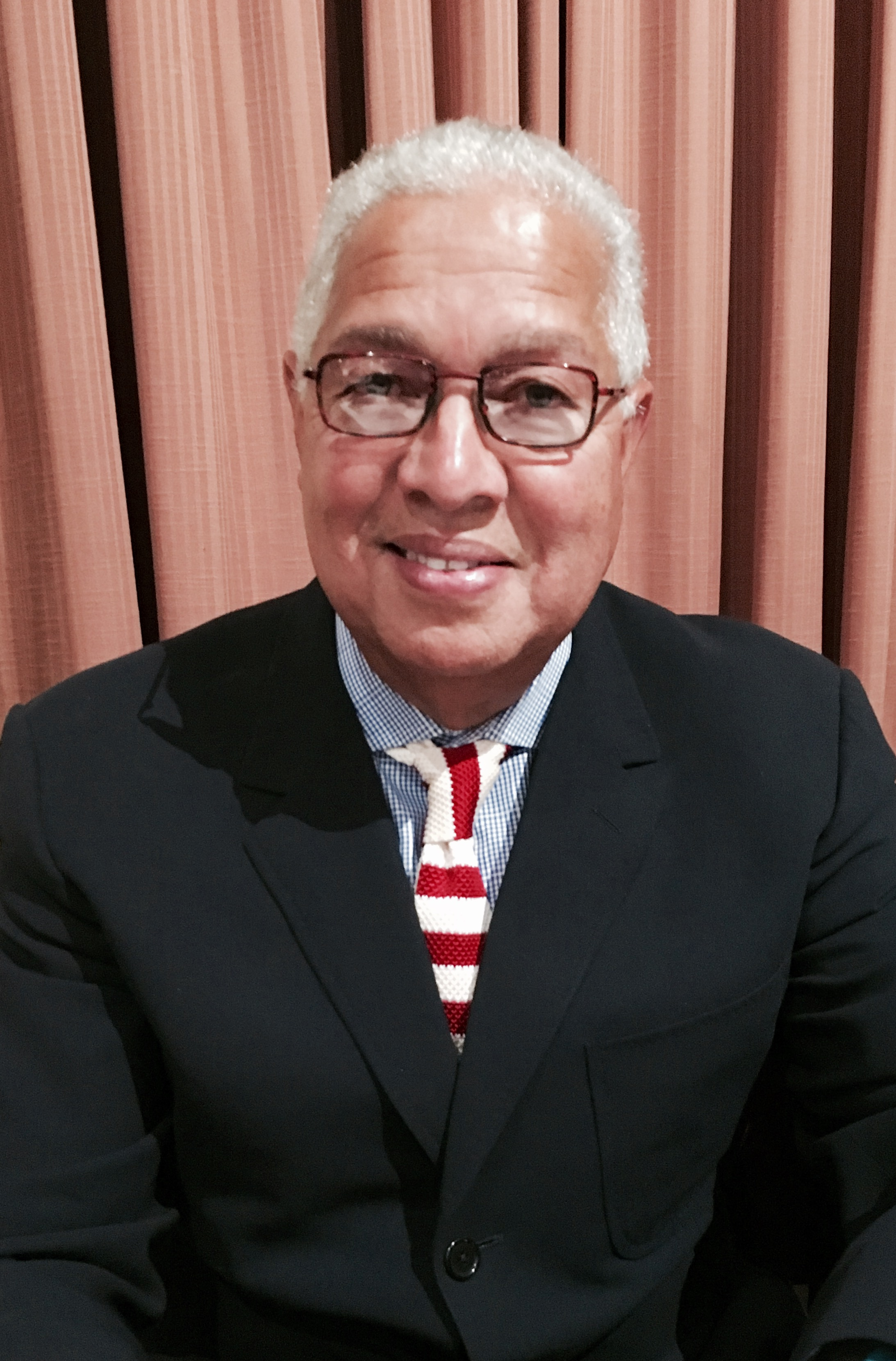

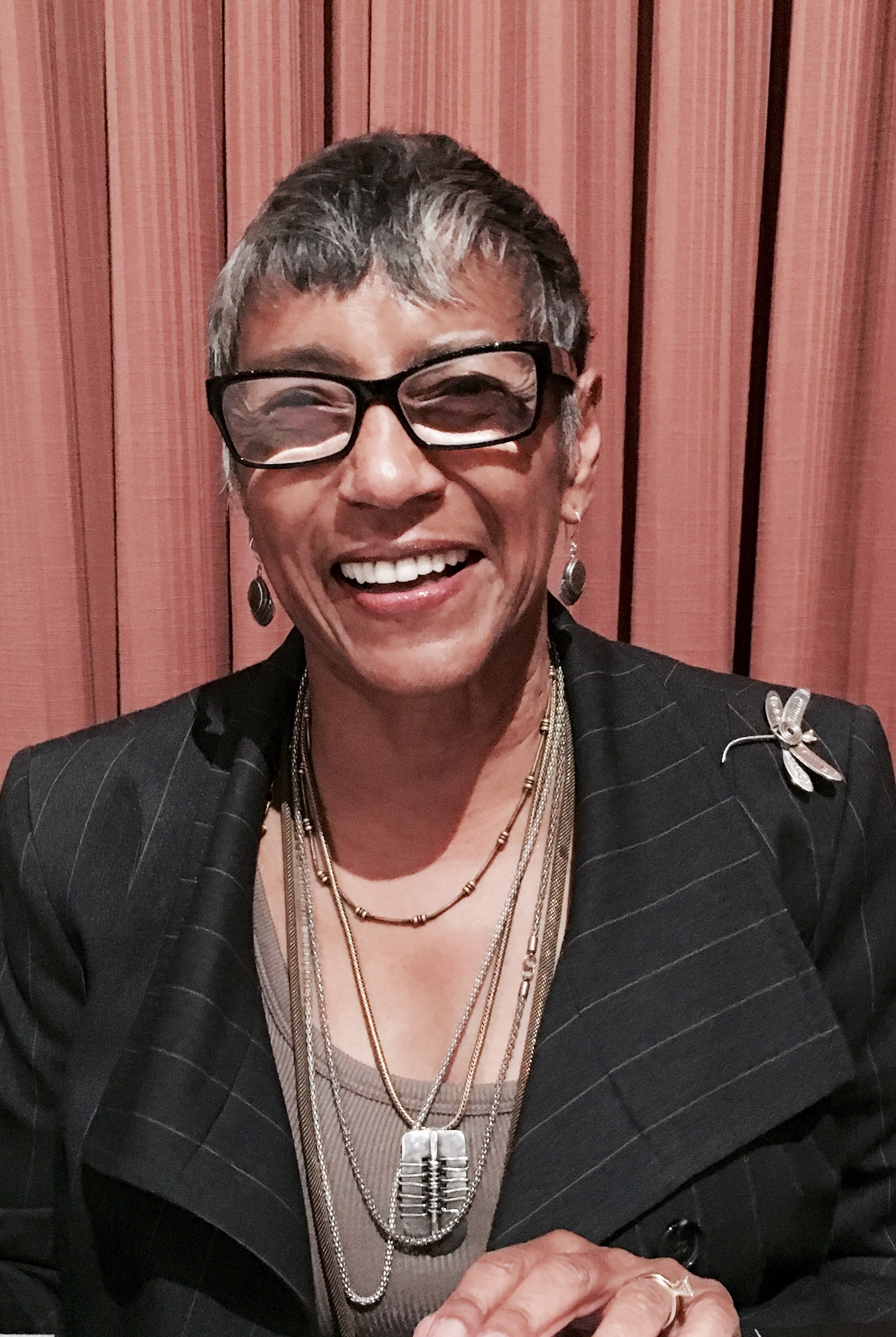

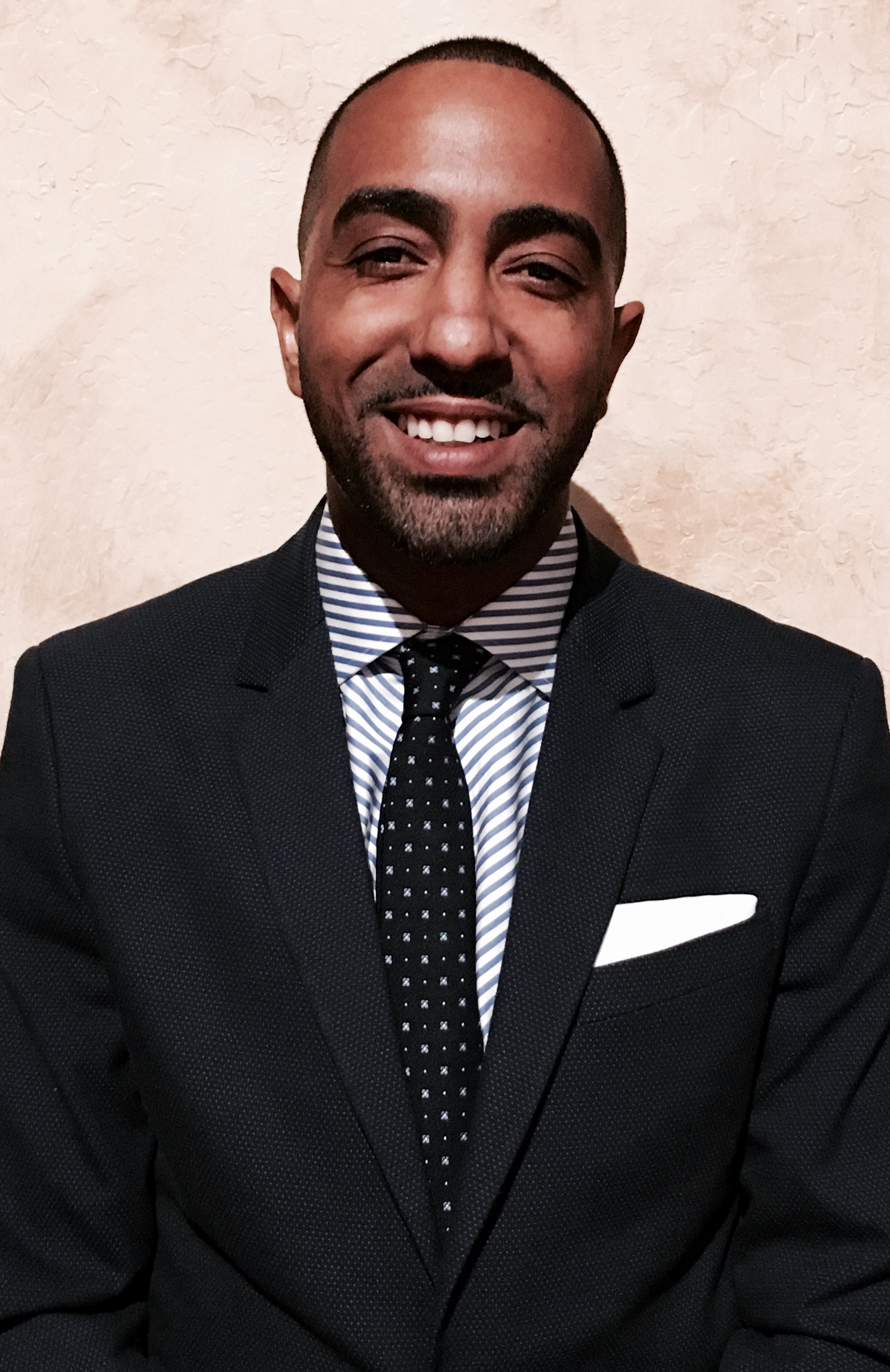

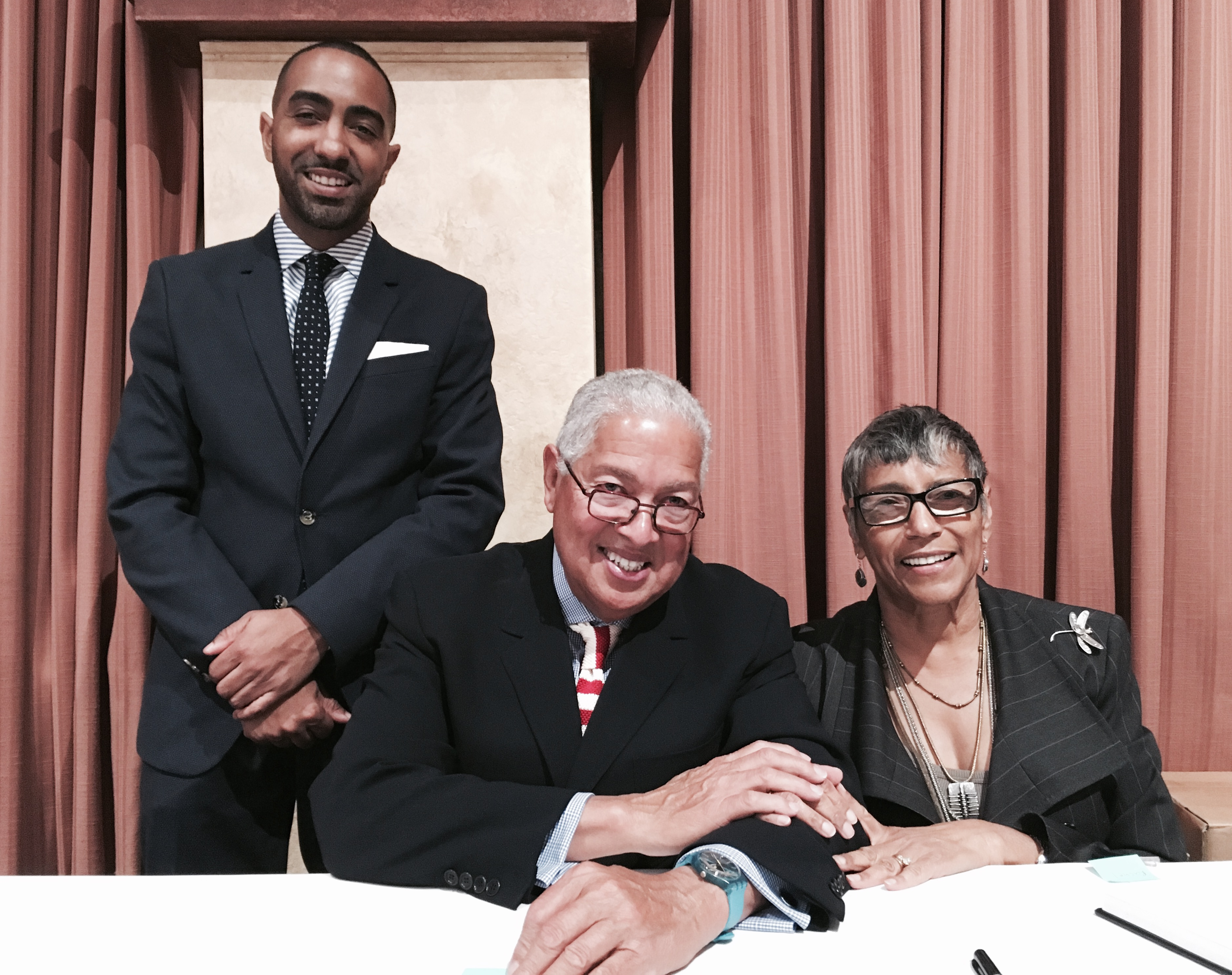
