= Nathan B. Young =

American educator (1862–1933)

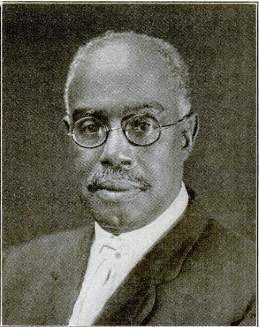
- Born: September 15, 1862; Newbern, Alabama
- Died: July 19, 1933 (aged 71)
- Education: Oberlin College, Talladega College
- Occupations: Teacher, President of Lincoln University and Florida A&M College
- Spouse(s): Emma Mae Garette (1891-1904; died of cancer), Margaret Buckley (1908-1933; his death)
- Children: Nathan B. Young Jr. (son), Gareth Young (daughter) William H Young (son)Frank D Young(son)Julia Young (daughter)
- Family: Susan Smith (Mother), Birth Father Unknown, Frank Young (Stepfather)

Nathan Benjamin Young (September 15, 1862—July 19, 1933) was an American educator who helped advance black education in the early 20th century. Born a slave in Alabama, Young later became an educator after Booker T. Washington, who witnessed Young’s skills in debating, invited him to teach at the Tuskegee Institute. Following his career as a teacher, Young later became a president of two major universities, Florida A&M University and Lincoln University. He and Henry Lee De Forest, the president of Talladega College, started a campaign to help improve education for the African American community.

== Early life ==
Nathan B. Young was born a slave in Newbern, Alabama. His mother is Susan Smith, also born a slave in the South. Before the Civil War started she gave birth to Nathan. Then they were sold off to a plantation overseer who tried to dodge the draft. Smith started to figure out that there was an underlying reason to dodge the draft, which was to keep them enslaved. His mother created a plot to escape slavery and run away to Tuscaloosa. Young and those who knew Young acknowledged the strength of his mother’s actions. Even Young’s stepfather was a strong individual. He took up firearms to ward of the local Ku Klux Klan. Many people like, Antonio F Holland believe that his mother and stepfather, Frank Young helped shape him into the strong figure that he was.

== Education ==
After enrolling in a small school which was operated by a white baptist minister in Tuscaloosa, Young attended Stillman College for three months. Following his work at this college, Young attended Talladega College where he received a classical education in the teacher-training branch. At Talladega, he met Henry Lee De Forest who later became one of his closest allies. Once he decided that his passion was to teach, he enrolled in Oberlin College where he obtained a bachelor’s and master's degree.

== Career ==
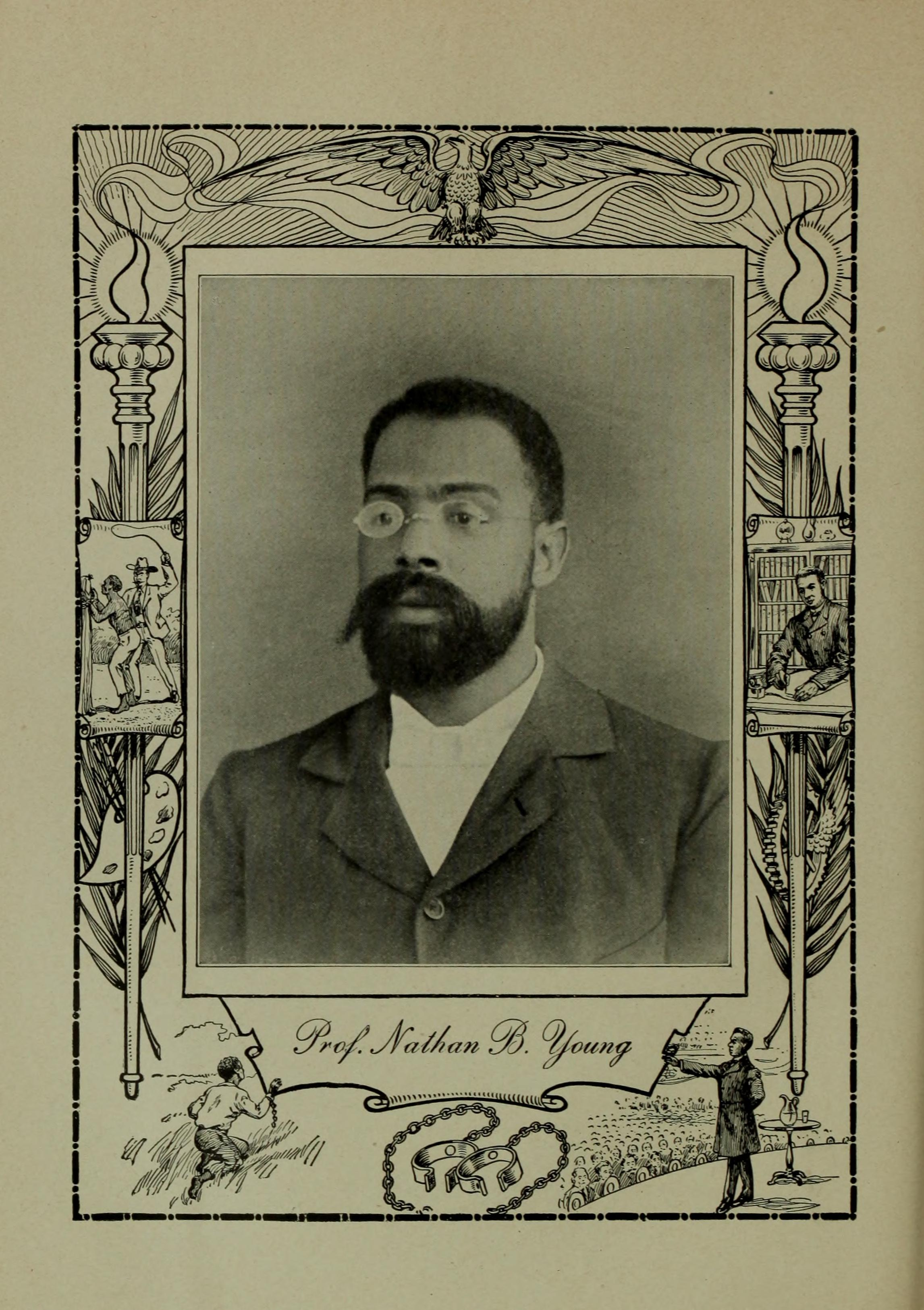

After his formal education, Young vigorously pursued a career in teaching. He first began teaching in the 1880s during his time at Talladega, where he taught in rural areas of Alabama during the summer. From 1892 to 1897, he was invited to serve as the head of Tuskegee Institute’s academic department at by Booker T. Washington. Soon after, he was employed at Georgia State Industrial College as the Director of Teacher Training.

Young served as the President of Florida A&M University from 1901 to 1923. Young was forced to resign as president during the governorship of Cary A. Hardee, who wanted to abolish the college's liberal arts program and convert it to a purely vocational school. Young ultimately resigned under pressure from the Florida Board of Control. In response, students at the school staged a violent strike that burned down multiple campus buildings.

Afterwards, Young became the President of Lincoln University.

== Speeches ==
- An Upward Departure in Negro Education at the National Association of Teachers in Colored Schools
