= James H. Ammons =

American academic

James Ammons
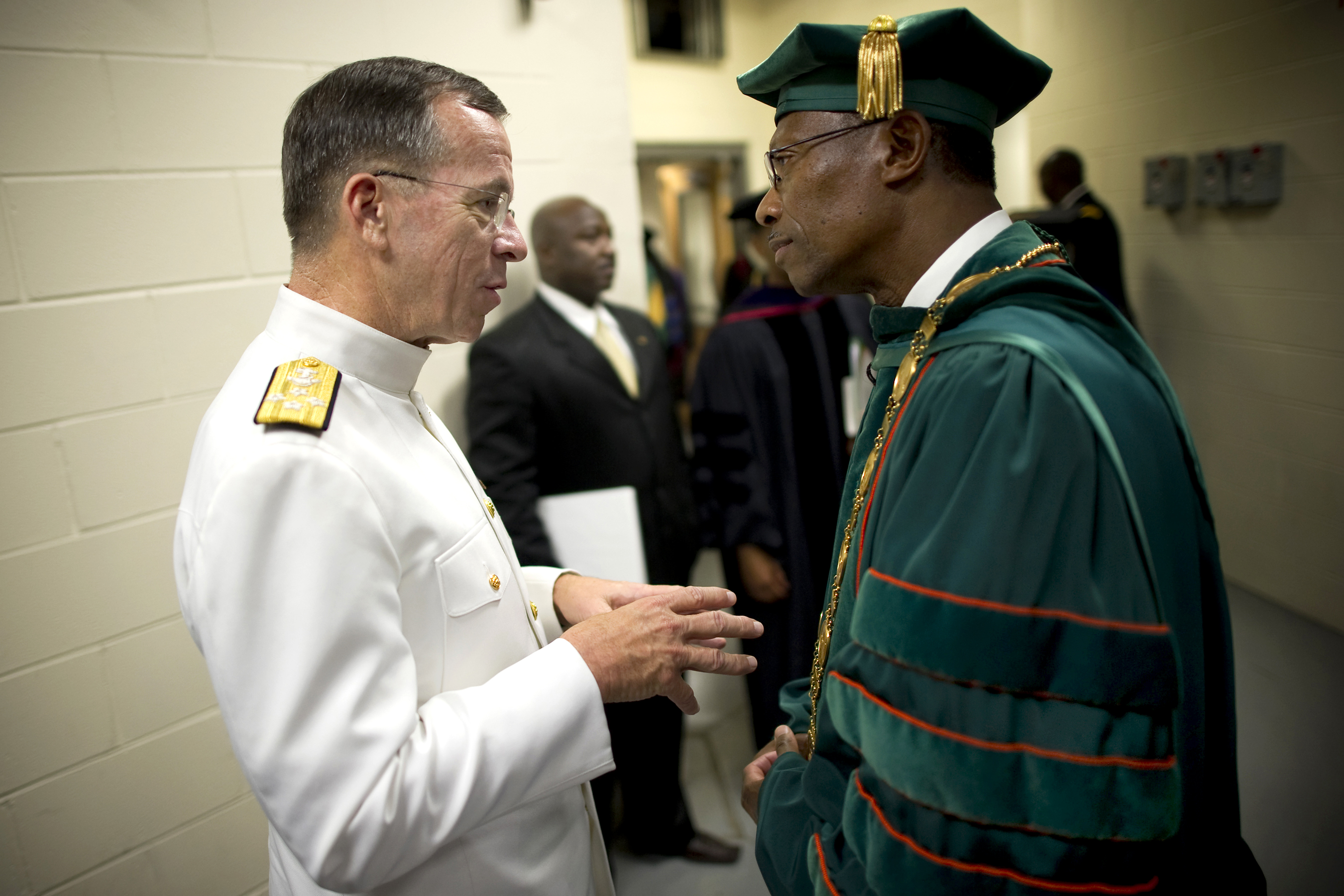
- Admiral Mike Mullen, chairman of the Joint Chiefs of Staff, speaks with then Florida A&M President James H. Ammons, Jr., May 2010

Chancellor of Southern University at New Orleans
- In office January 8, 2021 – August 1, 2025
- Preceded by: Lisa Mims-Devezin
- Succeeded by: Joseph Bouie

10th President of Florida A&M University
- In office July 2, 2007 – July 16, 2012
- Preceded by: Castell V. Bryant
- Succeeded by: Elmira Mangum

9th Chancellor of North Carolina Central University
- In office 2001 – June 30, 2007
- Preceded by: Julius L. Chambers
- Succeeded by: Charlie Nelms

Personal details
- Born: James H. Ammons, Jr. December 23, 1953 (age 72) Winter Haven, Florida, United States
- Spouse: Judy Ruffin Ammons
- Children: 1
- Education: Florida A&M University (BA); Florida State University (MS, PhD)
- Profession: University president, professor

James H. Ammons is an American educator and political scientist who has served as president and/or chancellor of three historically black colleges and universities (HBCUs): North Carolina Central University (NCCU) (president, 2001 - 2007); Florida A&M University (FAMU) (president, 2007–2012); and Southern University at New Orleans (chancellor, 2021–2025). A Florida native, he has received distinguished alumni awards from FAMU and Florida State University, where he received his doctorate degree in political science, and an honorary doctorate degree from Wilberforce University.

== Early life and education ==
Ammons was born on December 23, 1952, in Winter Haven, Florida. He is the only son of James H. Ammons Sr, and Agnes W. Ammons (1921–2006), a care nurse and seamstress. He has a sister, Patricia A. Salary. His parents divorced when he was young. He lived with his mother and sister in the predominantly black Florence Villa neighborhood of Winter Haven. Up until his senior year of high school, he attended segregated schools. He graduated from Winter Haven High School in 1970.

For college, he attended Florida A&M University (FAMU) on the Thirteen College Curriculum Program, and graduated cum laude with a B.S. degree in Political Science in 1974. At FAMU, he was an Alpha Kappa Mu Scholar. For graduate school, he attended Florida State University, where received his M.S. in Public Administration in 1975, and Ph.D. in government in 1977. At Florida State, he received a Minority Graduate Fellowship from the American Political Science Association. In 2008, he completed Kellogg School of Management's corporate governance training as part of the business school's executive management program.

== Career ==
Ammons began his teaching career in public policy and administration in 1977 as an assistant professor at the University of Central Florida.

=== Florida A&M University, 1983-2001 ===
In 1983, Ammons returned to his undergraduate alma mater, FAMU, as an associate professor of political science. In 1984, he was promoted to the position of assistant vice president for academic affairs. In 1989, he was promoted to associate vice president for academic affairs and also served as director of Title III Programs. He was promoted to the rank of a full professor in 1993.

In 1995, he was named provost and vice president for academic affairs. As provost, he led efforts to reestablish the Florida A&M University College of Law in Orlando.

=== North Carolina Central University ===
Ammons became the ninth chancellor of North Carolina Central University (NCCU) on June 1, 2001. During his presidency, NCCU was one of the fastest growing institutions in the University of North Carolina System and committed more than $120 million to campus construction projects. He oversaw the West Campus expansion project, the establishment of the Early College High School, and the building of the BRITE (Biomanufacturing Resource Institute and Technology Enterprise) Center on campus. In 2007, he resigned as chancellor to assume the Florida A&M University presidency.

=== Florida A&M University, 2007-2018 ===
In February 2007, Ammons was named the tenth president of Florida A&M University. Ammons's contract included the provision that it renewed on a daily basis (essentially making him "president for life"), and guaranteed an annual "performance bonus" of 25 to 35 percent of his $325,000 base salary. According to the Chronicle of Higher Education, Ammons was the only university president in Florida to have such an "evergreen" contract.

During Ammons’ presidency, FAMU became the first institution in the State University System of Florida to have its financial statements certified by the Board of Governors Office and the State Division of Finance. On July 11, 2012, Ammons announced that he would resign on October 11, 2012; this came several months after university Marching "100" drum major Robert Champion died following a hazing incident. However, on July 16, 2012, members of the Florida A&M University board of trustees voted to make his resignation effective immediately, the day after Champion's parents filed a lawsuit against the university.

After his resignation, Ammons returned to the FAMU political sciences faculty. He was a member of the faculty until 2018.

=== Delaware State University ===
In May 2016, Delaware State University, the only HBCU in Delaware, announced that Ammons had accepted the position as the university's new provost and vice president of academic affairs. In July 2016, Ammons announced that he would not accept the appointment at Delaware State, and would remain at FAMU. Reports indicate that his withdrawal from the Delaware State position may be related to investigation into his participation in the Florida Department of Economic Opportunity's Black Business Loan Program that awarded a total of $356,000, the largest award in the previous two years, to Ammons Food & Beverage LLC, an entity run by his son, James H. Ammons III.

=== Southern University System ===
In 2018, Ammons was named executive vice president and chief academic officer of the Southern University System.

From January 2018 to November 2019, he was Executive Vice Chancellor of Southern University and A&M College, the largest school in the Southern University System.

In November 2019, Ammons was named interim chancellor of Southern University at New Orleans (SUNO). On January 8, 2021, he was appointed SUNO's chancellor.

== Personal ==
Ammons married his high school sweetheart, Judy Ruffin, who also graduated from Winter Haven High School, on June 14, 1975. They have a son, James Ammons III.

== Awards and honors ==
- 1986—American Council on Education Fellow and a CIGNA Foundation Fellow
- 1993—Booth Ferris Fellow, University of Wisconsin-Madison
- 1999—Millennium Award, Florida A&M University
- 2000—Nissan-Educational Testing Service Fellow
- 2002—Guardian of Our Legacy Award, HBCU College Fair Reunion
- 2015—Honorary doctorate, Wilberforce University

== Board and committee memberships ==
The following is a representative list of Ammons' current and former board and committee memberships.

- Chair, Editorial Board, University Press of Florida
