= Rita Geier =

American civil rights activist

Rita Geier (née Sanders) is an American civil rights pioneer, attorney at law, and public servant. As a professor at Tennessee State University, she was the original plaintiff in a landmark lawsuit that led to the racial integration of higher education throughout the State of Tennessee.

== Early life and education ==
Rita Sanders was born in Memphis, Tennessee in 1944. Her parents were Edwin and Jessie Sanders. Edwin Sanders was a Methodist minister and served on the Board of Education for the Southwest Conference of the Central Jurisdiction for the United Methodist Church. He died in 1959. Jessie Sanders was a public school teacher. In 1961, Geier graduated from Melrose High School in Memphis which was segregated at the time.

Sanders earned a bachelor's degree from Fisk University, a Juris Doctor degree from Vanderbilt University, and a master's from the University of Chicago. She is admitted to practice law in Tennessee and Washington, D.C.

Sanders married Paul Geier in 1970. Civil rights activist and pastor, James Morris Lawson, Jr., officiated at the couple's wedding. The Geiers have two sons, Chris and Jon.

== Career ==
Following graduate school, she began her career as a history faculty professor at Tennessee State University in the late 1960s. She spent much of the 1970s as an attorney with Seattle-King County Legal Services and Legal Services Corporation, where she served as western regional director. She joined the U.S. Department of Justice (DOJ) in 1979 as Assistant Director for Commercial Litigation and Senior Trial Counsel. From 1979 to 1988 she worked in the DOJ’s Civil Division. In 1988, she was named General Counsel for the Appalachian Regional Commission (ARC), a role she held until 1992.

She joined the U.S. Social Security administration in 1992 as Associate Commissioner and Deputy Associate Commissioner for Hearings and Appeals. In 2001 she was promoted to Executive Counselor to the Commissioner and held that role from 2001 to 2007.

She was named Associate to the Chancellor and Senior Fellow at the Howard Baker Center for Public Policy at the University of Tennessee at Knoxville in 2007 and held the post until 2011 In this role she oversaw the school's "Ready for the World" initiative which sought to address public policy issues of cultural diversity.

== Lawsuit against the University of Tennessee ==
In 1968, Geier was a young student attending Vanderbilt Law School and an instructor at Tennessee State University (TSU), the only state-funded historically black university in Tennessee.

Early in her tenure, Geier became troubled by the state of Tennessee’s plan to construct a new facility for the Nashville campus of the Knoxville-based University of Tennessee while neglecting TSU. She came to learn that the salaries for faculty at TSU were significantly lower than those at the University of Tennessee.

Geier worked as a clerk for in the law office of George Barrett, a white local attorney and Vanderbilt Law School alumnus. who agreed to file a lawsuit against the state of Tennessee and then Governor Buford Ellington, alleging that Tennessee maintained dual higher education systems. The suit attempted to block the construction of a new facility. The original case was filed as Sanders v. Ellington and later became known as Geier v. Tennessee.

The foundational argument of the case rested on the premise that the expansion of the University of Tennessee-Nashville (UTN) would perpetuate two higher education systems in Nashville by creating competition between the two schools for students, faculty and state funding. The case highlighted a failure to desegregate publicly funded institutions throughout the state.

The filing of the case failed to halt construction of the new facility and UTN expanded into an area near the state capitol of Tennessee. TSU continued to suffer from neglect due to inadequate resources and funding. In 1970, Sanders married, and the name of the case changed numerous times as new governors were elected and immediately became defendants. Throughout its history the matter is documented as Geier v. Dunn, Geier v. Blanton, Geier v. Alexander, Geier v. McWhorter, Geier v. Sundquist and finally Geier v. Bredesen.

In 1972, TSU professors Sterling Adams, Raymond Richardson and 100 other black Tennesseans joined the case as plaintiffs. Avon Williams Jr., a civil rights attorney and state senator, represented the new plaintiffs.

Following a judge’s ruling, on July 1, 1979, the merger of University of Tennessee at Nashville and TSU took effect. The combination marked the first time in history that a historically black college or university and a traditionally white institution were brought under a single banner. At the same time, UTN and TSU faculty member H. Coleman McGinnis joined as a co-plaintiff.

The merger agreement was further modified in 1984 by Judge Thomas A. Wiseman Jr. who added a stipulation of settlement requiring quotas to ensure that TSU increased its white enrollment while other state schools expand the population of non-white students. This added more than $100 million to the coffers of TSU campuses. In recognition for his work on the case and his lifelong devotion to civil rights, the downtown Nashville campus of TSU was named after Avon Williams in 1986.

A mediated decree, known as the Geier Consent Decree, was ordered by the court on January 4, 2001. The agreement allocated $77 million to address diversity at institutions throughout Tennessee. As a result of the decree, black enrollment at UTN expanded by 2.2%. During this period, the institution expanded its African American student population from 10.5% to 12.4%.

On July 21, 2006, a federal mediator negotiated the final dismissal of the case. To commemorate the end of the 38-year case, Geier appeared with Governor Phil Bredesen to announce that she and the other plaintiffs would be asking a judge to dismiss the lawsuit, acknowledging that the state had finally met its desegregation obligations. The state of Tennessee had appropriated $15.5 million for the Tennessee State endowment, $19.8 million in capital outlays and almost $15 million in student financial aid since mediation began in 2000.

== Honors and awards ==
Geier was the fall 2006 commencement speaker at the University of Tennessee. In 2007, she was elected as a fellow of the National Academy of Public Administration.

President Clinton awarded her Presidential Rank Meritorious Executive Award for her work with the Social Security Administration.

In February 2021, the University of Tennessee, Knoxville announced the naming of a dormitory building in Geier's honor.

== Impact of the case ==
The Geier v. Tennessee case and subsequent litigation, had a broad reaching impact on education in the state. In 2001, Tennessee began offering enrichment programs for African American high school students aimed at improving student scores on standardized tests. Tennessee State University is today a fully-integrated institution, offering bachelor, master's and doctoral degrees. The combination of UTN and TSU now comprises more than 65 buildings spanning 500 acres. Of the roughly 10,000 students, 75% are African American and 22% are white. About 10% of the 2006 freshman class at the University of Tennessee were African American.
