= STOP School Violence Act =

US Congressional legislation

- Long title: Student, Teachers, and Officers Preventing School Violence Act of 2018 or the STOP School Violence Act of 2018

Legislative history
- Introduced in the House of Representatives as H.R. 4909 by John Rutherford (R–FL) on January 30, 2018; Committee consideration by House Judiciary, Senate Judiciary; Passed the House on March 14, 2018 (407-10 )

The Student, Teachers, and Officers Preventing School Violence Act of 2018, also known as the STOP School Violence Act, was pending legislation to provide funding grants to schools to be used for implementing security measures.

The STOP School Violence Act would provide, amongst other things, funding for measures such as:

- Training to prevent student violence against others with new training for law enforcement officers, school personnel, and students.
- The "development and operation of anonymous reporting systems for threats of school violence."
- The "acquisition and installation of technology for expedited notification of local law enforcement during an emergency."

The act was passed in the United States House of Representatives by a vote of 407–10 on March 14, 2018, and was received in the United States Senate and read twice, and referred to the Committee on the Judiciary on March 15, 2018.

The act was subsequently not actioned further in the Senate as part of the 115th United States Congress.
