= J. R. E. Lee =

African-American education leader (1864–1944)

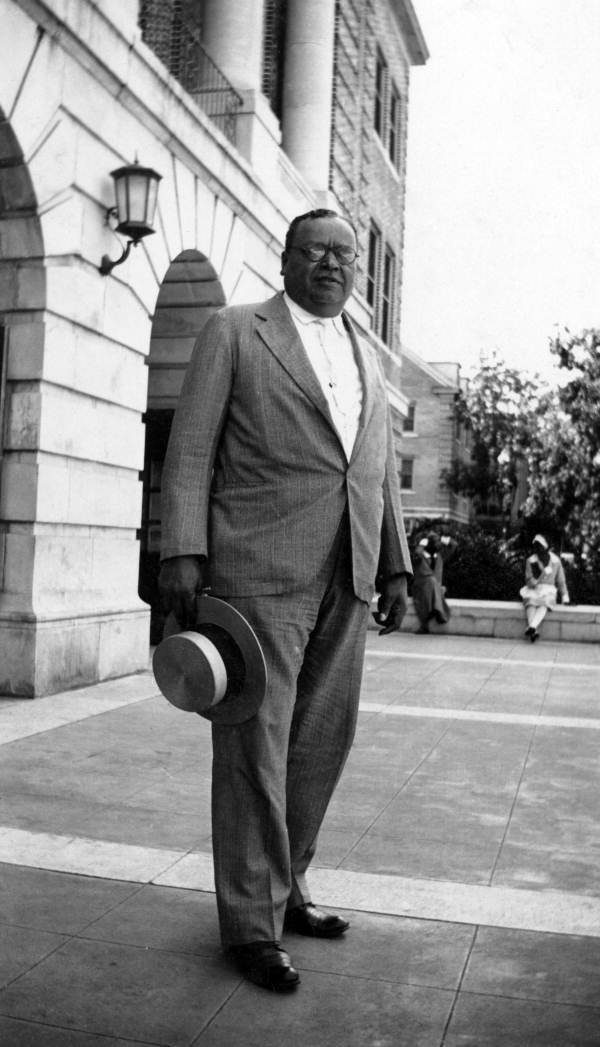
Lee in 1933

John Robert Edward Lee Sr. (January 26, 1864 – April 6, 1944) was an early leader in African-American education. He served as the third President of Florida Agricultural and Mechanical University, a historically black college, from 1924 to 1944.

== Biography ==
John Robert Edward Lee was born into slavery to John and Mary (Mayes) Lee in Seguin, Texas. He attended Bishop College, starting in 1883 with preparatory classes and graduating with honors in 1889, the third person to graduate with an A.B. from Bishop. He spent the next two years as the principal of a two-teacher school in Palestine, Texas. In 1891, he returned to Bishop to spend the next decade there as a faculty member, serving as Dean of Men and Professor of history, mathematics, and Latin. In 1895, he married Ardelia Wilson and they would have seven children.

In 1901, he became head of the Division of Mathematics at the Tuskegee University under the leadership of Dr. Booker T. Washington. After two years, he left to become professor of mathematics at Benedict College, but returned to Tuskegee as Director of the Academic Department in 1905. In 1904, Lee founded the National Association of Teachers in Colored Schools and served as president for its first five years. From 1915 to 1921 he served as principal of Lincoln High School in Kansas City, Missouri. For his work in these years he was awarded a number of honorary degrees: an M.A. from Bishop in 1903, an LL.D. from Wilberforce University in 1918 for "his unselfish educational and humanitarian services", and an LL.D. from Howard University. During this time he also took courses at the University of Wisconsin–Madison, University of Chicago, University of Minnesota, and Cornell University. In 1921, he left education and became Extension Secretary of the National Urban League.

Following a recommendation from Jackson Davis, Lee became President of Florida Agricultural and Mechanical University in 1924. Lee obtained greater funding for the university from the Florida Board of Control, the General Education Board, and the Rosenwald Fund and accreditation for the university from the Southern Association of Colleges and Secondary Schools. He was able to obtain greater salaries for teachers and administrators despite the statement of Florida Governor Fred P. Cone that "no Negro was worth $4000 a year". By the end of Lee's tenure, "FAMU had constructed 48 buildings, accumulated 396 acres of land, and had 812 students and 122 staff members."

Lee died of pneumonia and was buried at his request in Marshall, Texas.
