= Alpha Kappa Mu =

American collegiate honor society

- ΑΚΜ
- Founded: 26 November 1937; 88 years ago Tennessee A&I State College
- Type: Honor
- Affiliation: ACHS
- Status: Active
- Emphasis: General scholarship
- Scope: National
- Colors: Royal blue and White
- Symbol: Torch, Quill, Open book
- Publication: Alpha Kappa Mu Newsletter
- Chapters: 79
- Members: 93,000 lifetime
- Headquarters: c/o Dr. Mollie B. Brown; Executive Secretary-Treasurer; Alpha Kappa Mu Honor Society; 324 Enterprise Drive; Albany, Georgia 31705; United States
- Website: www.alphakappamu.org

The Alpha Kappa Mu National Honor Society (ΑΚΜ) is an American collegiate honor society recognizing academic excellence in all areas of study.

== History ==
Alpha Kappa Mu was founded on November 26, 1937 at Tennessee Agricultural & Industrial State College in Nashville, Tennessee. Alpha Kappa Mu Honor Society grew out of an idea conceived by George W. Gore then dean of Tennessee A&I State College. In November 1937, Gore invited representatives from five colleges that already had local scholastic honor societies on their campuses to meet at the college. The Federation of Honor Societies formed as an outgrowth of this meeting on November 26, 1937.

The local organizations that merged to form the Federation of Honor Societies were Alpha Epsilon at Bennett College, Alpha Delta Sigma at West Virginia State College, Beta Tau Upsilon at Tuskegee Institute, Gamma Tau at Negro Agricultural and Technical College of North Carolina, and Phi Beta Tau at Tennessee Agricultural & Industrial State College. The first chairman of the Federation was James C. Evans of West Virginia State College and Gore was the executive secretary/treasurer.

The original goal of the Federation of Honor Societies was to promote and reward academic excellence among African-American students. Due to its roots, most added chapters were located at Historically Black Colleges and Universities, though some later additions are at predominantly white colleges.

Its first annual convention was held at Tennessee A&I State College in 1937. At its third annual convention at Arkansas Agricultural, Mechanical and Normal College in December 1939, its names was changed to Alpha Kappa Mu Honor Society and a constitution was approved.

Alpha Kappa Mu was admitted to the Association of College Honor Societies in 1952. Gore retired from being the executive secretary/treasurer in 1974 after 25 years in that office, becoming an emeritus member of the society's executive committee. Alpha Kappa Mu was incorporated in the State of South Carolina on September 7, 1977. Starting in 1999, its convention became biennial.

The society has admitted approximately 93,000 members at 79 chapters. Most chapters are found in the South and Midwest, and the majority are at public colleges and universities. Its national headquarters is in Albany, Georgia.

== Symbols ==
The official colors of Alpha Kappa Mu are Royal Blue and white. The society's symbols are the torch, the quill, and the open book. Its publication is Alpha Kappa Mu Newsletter.

Its stole consists of a white honor cord that wraps behind the neck and down both sides of the front and is joined across the chest with a blue satin v-shaped panel embroidered in gold and black with the society's key.

== Membership ==
Potential members are in the top ten percent of their class and are juniors or seniors with a GPA of 3.3 with a minimum of thirty hours. Graduate students with a GPA of 3.7 with a minimum of fifteen hours are also eligible for membership. Although originally linked to historically Black colleges and universities, today acceptance of new members is race-blind.

== Chapters ==
Alpha Kappa Mu has chartered 79 chapters in colleges and universities across the United States.

== See also ==
- Honor cords
