= Florida A&M University =

Historically Black university in Tallahassee, Florida, US

Florida Agricultural and Mechanical University
- Former names: Florida Agricultural and Mechanical College for Negroes (1909–1953); State Normal and Industrial College for Colored Students (1891–1909); State Normal College for Colored Students (1887–1891)
- Motto: "Head, Heart, Hand, Field" "Excellence With Caring"
- Type: Public historically black land-grant university
- Established: October 3, 1887; 139 years ago
- Parent institution: State University System of Florida
- Accreditation: SACS
- Academic affiliations: ORAU; TMCF; Space-grant
- Endowment: $135.7 million (2025)
- President: Marva Johnson
- Students: 9,313 (fall 2024)
- Undergraduates: 7,890
- Postgraduates: 1,423
- Location: Tallahassee, Florida, United States; 30°25′04″N 84°17′04″W
- Campus: 422 acres (1.7 km^{2}); Midsize city
- Other campuses: Crestview; Orlando
- Newspaper: The FAMUAN
- Colors: Orange and green
- Nickname: Rattlers and Lady Rattlers
- Sporting affiliations: NCAA Division I FCS – SWAC
- Mascot: Venom the Rattlesnake
- Website: famu.edu

Florida A&M University (FAMU) is a public historically black land-grant university in Tallahassee, Florida, United States. Founded in 1887, it is the third-largest historically black university in the US by enrollment and the only public historically black university in Florida. It is a member of the State University System of Florida and is accredited to award baccalaureate, master's, and doctoral degrees by the Commission on Colleges of the Southern Association of Colleges and Schools.

Florida A&M sports teams are known as the Rattlers, and compete in Division I of the NCAA. They are a member of the Southwestern Athletic Conference (SWAC).

== History ==
Black abolitionist Jonathan C. Gibbs first introduced legislation to create the State Normal College for Colored Students in 1885, one year after being elected to the Florida Legislature. The date also reflects the new Florida Constitution of 1885, which prohibited racial integration in schools. The college was located in Tallahassee because Leon County and adjacent counties led the state in African-American population, reflecting Tallahassee's former status as the center of Florida's slave trade. (See Tallahassee's black history.) The site of the university is the 375-acre slave plantation of Florida governor William Pope Duval, whose mansion, today the site of the Carnegie Library, burned in 1905.

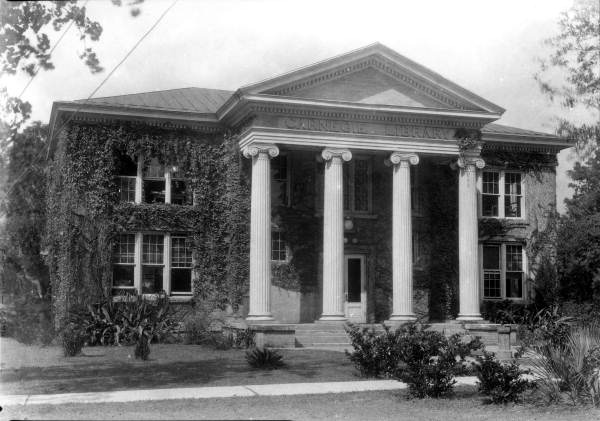
Carnegie Library c. 1930.

On October 3, 1887, the State Normal College for Colored Students began classes, and became a land-grant college four years later when it received $7,500 under the Second Morrill Act, and its name was changed to State Normal and Industrial College for Colored Students. However, it was not an official institution of higher learning until the 1905 Buckman Act, which transferred control from the Department of Education to the Board of Control, creating what was the foundation for the modern Florida A&M University. This same act is responsible for the creation of the University of Florida and Florida State University from their previous institutions. In 1909, the name of the college was once again changed, to Florida Agricultural and Mechanical College for Negroes (FAMC), and in 1953 the name was finally changed to Florida Agricultural and Mechanical University. Florida A&M is the only surviving publicly funded historically black college or university in the state of Florida. (Twelve publicly funded junior colleges serving primarily the African-American population of Florida existed for different periods between 1949 and 1966.)

In 1923, there was a student strike that led to the destruction of multiple campus buildings. The strike was a response to Governor Cary A. Hardee's attempts to eliminate the liberal arts program at the university and convert it to a purely vocational school. Hardee believed that a more educated black populace would be more likely to leave the state, which would negatively impact Florida's economy, and thus believed it was necessary to prevent African-American Floridians from being able to access non-vocational education. The conflict led to the resignation of university president Nathan B. Young, which in turn sparked a student protest that burned down multiple campus buildings. Ultimately, the liberal arts program was restored after the end of Hardee's term and the appointment of J. R. E. Lee as the fourth president of the university.

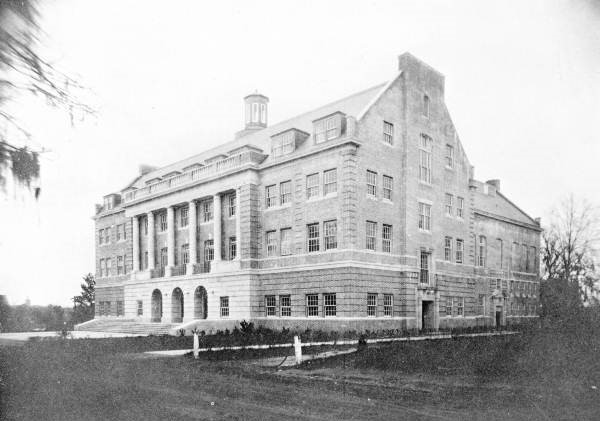
Lee Hall c. 1930.

In 1951, the university started a pharmacy and nursing program. In order to give these students hands-on experience, the university built a hospital. Until 1971 Florida A&M Hospital was the only one within 150 miles (240 km) of Tallahassee to serve African Americans. It closed in 1971, after then-Tallahassee Memorial Hospital, under federal pressure, started serving African Americans.

In 1992, 1995, and 1997, Florida A&M successfully recruited more National Achievement Scholars than Harvard. FAMU tied with Harvard in 2000, recruiting 62 new National Achievement Scholars, although by 2006 that number had declined to one. The National Achievement Scholarship Corporation discontinued naming scholars in 2015.

In the fall of 1997, Florida A&M was selected as the Time-Princeton Review "College of the Year" and was cited in 1999 by Black Issues in Higher Education for awarding more baccalaureate degrees to African-Americans than any institution in the nation.

In 2011 Robert Champion, a band member, was beaten to death in a hazing incident. Two faculty members resigned in connection with a hazing investigation and thirteen people were charged with felony or misdemeanor hazing crimes; one student, a band member, was convicted of manslaughter and hazing charges and sentenced to six years in prison. The scandal resulted in the resignation of Florida A&M's president and played a role in the university's regional accreditor, the Southern Association of Colleges and Schools, placing Florida A&M on probation for one year.

In 2019, Florida A&M and other HBCUs developed a partnership with Adtalem Global Education and its for-profit Ross University School of Medicine in Barbados.

In May 2024, Florida A&M administrators announced during a commencement ceremony that it had received a $237 million donation, the largest single personal donation to Florida A&M in its 136-year history and the largest gift ever to a HBCU, from Gregory Gerami, CEO of Batterson Farms Corporation. The gift quickly came under scrutiny due to questions about its legitimacy. The donation was stock from Gerami's private company and its value could not be determined. In response to the public skepticism, Florida A&M paused the acceptance of the gift and initiated an external investigation to determine the soundness of the Gerami donation. The following month, university president Larry Robinson resigned. His resignation followed the May 2024 resignation of Shawnta Friday-Stroud, Florida A&M 's former vice president for university advancement and executive director of the FAMU Foundation, who played a key role in negotiating the Gerami donation.

In August 2024, Florida A&M released a final report prepared by Buchanan Ingersoll & Rooney that concluded that the Gerami donation was of no real cash value. The report suggested that the proposed donor may have knowingly misrepresented his financial holdings and outlined how much the failed gift cost the university in actual travel and entertainment expenses as well as negative impact on the university's reputation.

=== Florida A&M student activism during the Civil Rights Era ===
Demonstrations such as the Tallahassee bus boycotts and CORE-led sit-in protests were influenced by the efforts of Florida A&M students to challenge racial segregation during the Civil Rights Movement. These protests brought national recognition to issues involving interracial dynamics and called attention to the importance of reform in the Tallahassee area.

On May 26, 1956, Wilhemina Jakes and Carrie Patterson, two Florida A&M University students, were arrested by the Tallahassee Police Department for "placing themselves in a position to incite a riot." Both Jakes and Pattersin were let out on bonds, but later returned home to crosses burning on their yards that had been placed by members of the Ku Klux Klan. After this incident FAMU students agreed to boycott the Tallahassee bus system and encouraged other African Americans in the Leon County area to do the same. These student-led protests started what is now known as the Tallahassee bus boycotts, which sought to end racial segregation in the employment and seating arrangements of city buses.

Thanks to the leadership of FAMU students and sisters Priscilla and Patricia Stephens Due, Florida A&M's CORE chapter played an active role in several protests across Tallahassee from 1959 to 1964. In November 1959, CORE members conducted their first of many "tests" that attempted to challenge the parctices of racial segregation in the Tallahassee area, with their focus being on whether the city's bus system continued to operate under segregated lines out of "cultural habit" or an "officially imposed pattern." Similar tests were carried out at dime stores around the city, which attempted to measure "discrimination on an empirical level" rather than act as an early version of what would eventually be the student's sit-in protests. Further testing of the bus system took place around the same time as the dime store tests, where students attempted to but inter-state bus tickets from "whites-only" terminals.

In February 1960, news spread to Tallahassee's CORE chapter about the Greensboro sit-ins and the group was encouraged to participate in their own as an act of solidarity. Eight Florida A&M students and two local high schoolers volunteered to participate in the group's first sit in at their local Woolworth lunch counter. After being refused service, students remained at the counter for two hours and did not leave until law enforcement arrived. The CORE chapter later agreed to return to Woolworth the following week with a larger, more well-trained group of students. Rather than letting protestors disperse like before, Tallahassee police arrested 11 out of the 17 protestors present on the grounds of "disturbing the peace." Among those arrested were the Due sisters along with 6 other Florida A&M students. Throughout February and March 1960 numerous other planned sit-ins occurred in the Tallahassee area, with among the most notable taking place March 11 at both the McCrory and Woolworth lunch counters. After the arrest of sit-in protestors from both locations, Patricia Stephens Due along with other CORE members gathered a group of 1,000 FAMU students to lead a protest in downtown Tallahassee, where police officers armed with tear gas awaited their arrival and arrested several more students.

On March 17 the 11 original protestors arrested were found guilty on counts of "disturbing the peace" and "unlawful assembly," leading for them to either paying a $300 fine or serve a 60-day jail sentence for their crimes. Rather than pay the fines, the protestors decided to serve out their full sentence, making the 8 Florida A&M students some of the first sit-in protestors to accept a jail sentence over bail.

In 1963, Florida A&M students demonstrated against segregation in the city. Throughout September 14–16, mass protests led to around 350 arrests, many of which were FAMU students. Major arrests occurred on September 14 following a protest on the segregated State Theater led by Patricia Stephens Due, with over 248 student arrests in one day on the ground of "willful trespass." Around 250 more student protestors arrived to the jail under the guidance of Reverend's C.K. Steele, E.G. Evans, and David Brooks to protest the arrest of their peers the night before along with the 16th Street Baptist Church bombing that occurred the same day, leading for the arrest of 100 more students. An overflow of the prison ensued, leading for parts of the Leon County Fairgrounds to be turned into temporary detainment facilities.

=== University presidents ===
1. Thomas Desaille Tucker 1887–1901
2. Nathan B. Young 1901–1923
3. William A. Howard 1923–1924
4. John Robert Edward Lee 1924–1944
5. J.B. Bragg April 5, 1944 – September 1, 1944
6. William H. Gray Jr. 1944–1949
7. H. Manning Efferson July 7, 1949 – April 1, 1950
8. George W. Gore 1950–1968
9. Benjamin L. Perry Jr. 1968–1977
10. Walter L. Smith 1977–1985
11. Frederick S. Humphries 1985–2001
12. Henry Lewis III January 2002 – June 2002
13. Fred Gainous 2002–2004
14. Castell V. Bryant January 2005 – May 2007
15. James H. Ammons July 2, 2007 – July 16, 2012
16. Elmira Mangum April 1, 2014 – September 15, 2016
17. Larry Robinson November 30, 2017 – July 2024 (interim: May–July 2007, July 2012 – April 2014, September 2016 – November 2017)
18. Timothy L. Beard August 5, 2024 – July 31, 2025 (interim)
19. Marva Johnson August 1, 2025 – Present

== Academics ==
The university offers 54 bachelor's degree programs, 29 master's degree programs, one professional degree, and 12 doctoral degree programs. It has 14 schools and colleges. Florida A&M also has an honors program for high-achieving undergraduate students who meet the high performance criteria. Florida A&M is a member school of the Thurgood Marshall Scholarship Fund.

Florida A&M has nine fully funded, endowed, eminent-scholars chairs, including two in the School of Journalism and Graphic Communications, four in the School of Business & Industry, one in the College of Education, one in Arts and Sciences, and one in its School of Pharmacy.

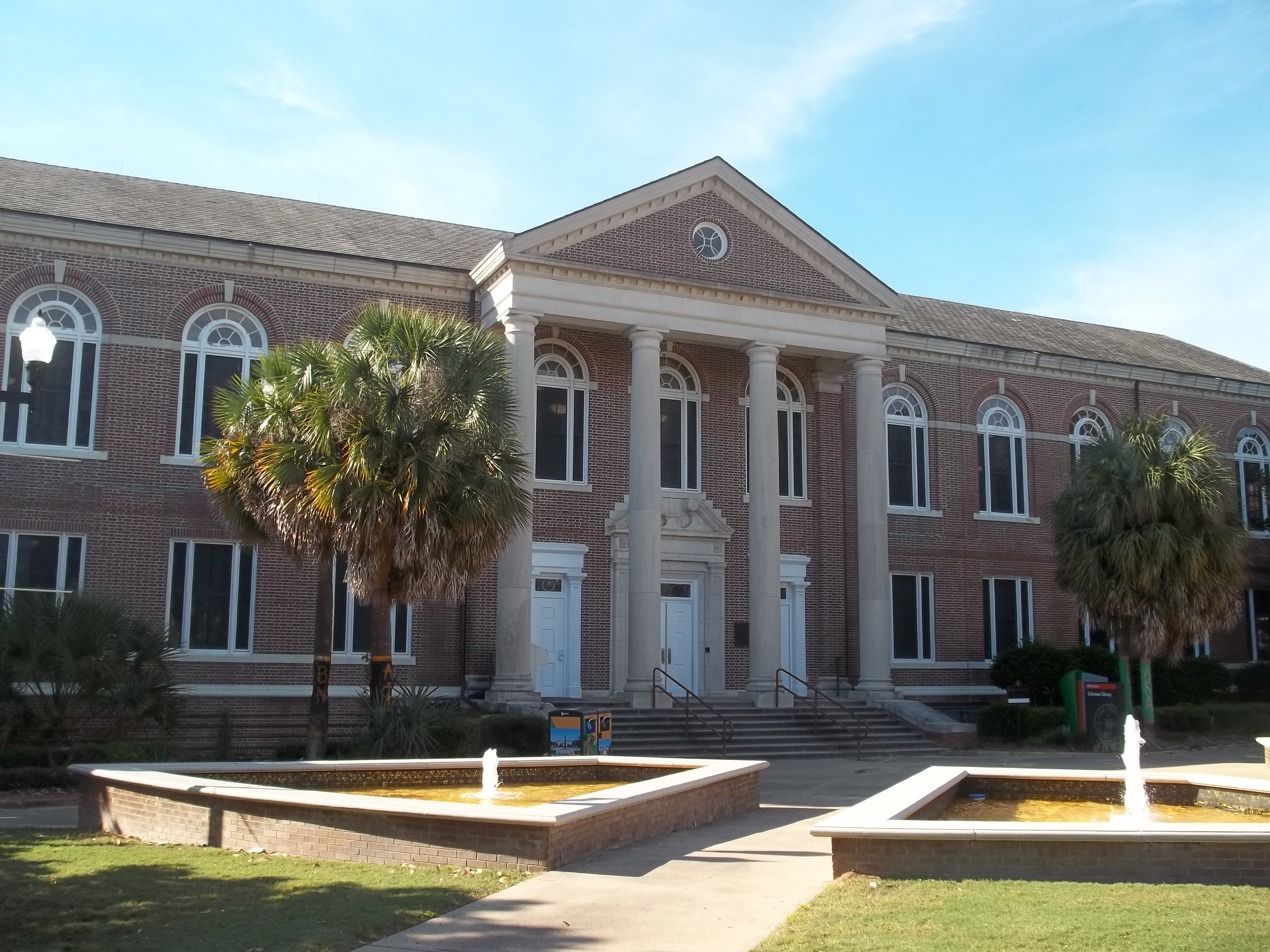
Coleman Library

Florida A&M's law school is one of five in the United States where twice as many women enroll as men.

=== Colleges and schools ===
FAMU offers undergraduate and graduate degrees through the following colleges and schools:

- College of Agriculture and Food Sciences
- College of Education
- FAMU - FSU College of Engineering
- College of Law
- College of Pharmacy and Pharmaceutical Sciences, Institute of Public Health
- College of Social Sciences, Arts, and Humanities
- College of Science and Technology
- School of Allied Health Sciences
- School of Architecture and Engineering Technology
- School of Business and Industry
- School of the Environment
- School of Graduate Studies and Research
- School of Journalism and Graphic Communication
- School of Nursing

=== Undergraduate admissions ===
The fall 2022 incoming freshmen class had an average high school GPA of 3.8 and an average SAT score of 1019 and ACT score of 22. The 2022 undergraduate admission rate was 31.9%

=== Demographics ===
Undergraduate demographics as of Fall 2023
Race and ethnicity	Total
Black	89%
Hispanic	5%
White	3%
Two or more races	2%
Economic diversity
Low-income (Note: The percentage of students who received an income-based federal Pell grant intended for low-income students.)	58%
Affluent (Note: The percentage of students who are a part of the American middle class at the bare minimum.)	42%

Florida A&M University student enrollment population consists primarily of undergraduates. 83% of the school's enrolled students are African-American. The next largest demographic group is White (non-Hispanic) students at 7%, followed by Hispanic students at 6%. Multiracial, Asian, Native American, and international students round out the remaining 4%.

=== Accreditation ===
Florida A&M University has been accredited by the Southern Association of Colleges and Schools (SACS) since 1935.

=== Graduation rate ===
In 2020, FAMU's four-year graduation rate was 21%, while its six-year graduation rate was 55%.

=== Rankings ===
Academic rankings

National
- U.S. News & World Report: 152

Global
- THE: 1001-1200
- U.S. News & World Report: 1581 (tie)

The 2024 edition of the U.S. News & World Report college rankings placed Florida A&M 170th among national universities, 91st among public universities, third among HBCUs, and first among public HBCUs. Florida A&M was also named 21st in the Top Performers in Social Mobility category.

It is classified among "R2: Doctoral Universities – High research activity".

For 2017, the National Science Foundation ranked Florida A&M 216th nationally and 2nd among HBCUs for total research and development expenditures.

=== Research ===
Florida A&M's annual research funding is $44.5 million. The university has access to research funding from many Federal agencies. FAMU's two largest research areas are agriculture and health sciences. The Pharmacy College's research funding is $20.2 million ($20.2 million in federal, $300k in state support, and from $300k in private industry support) with $29,281,352 committed.

== Campus ==
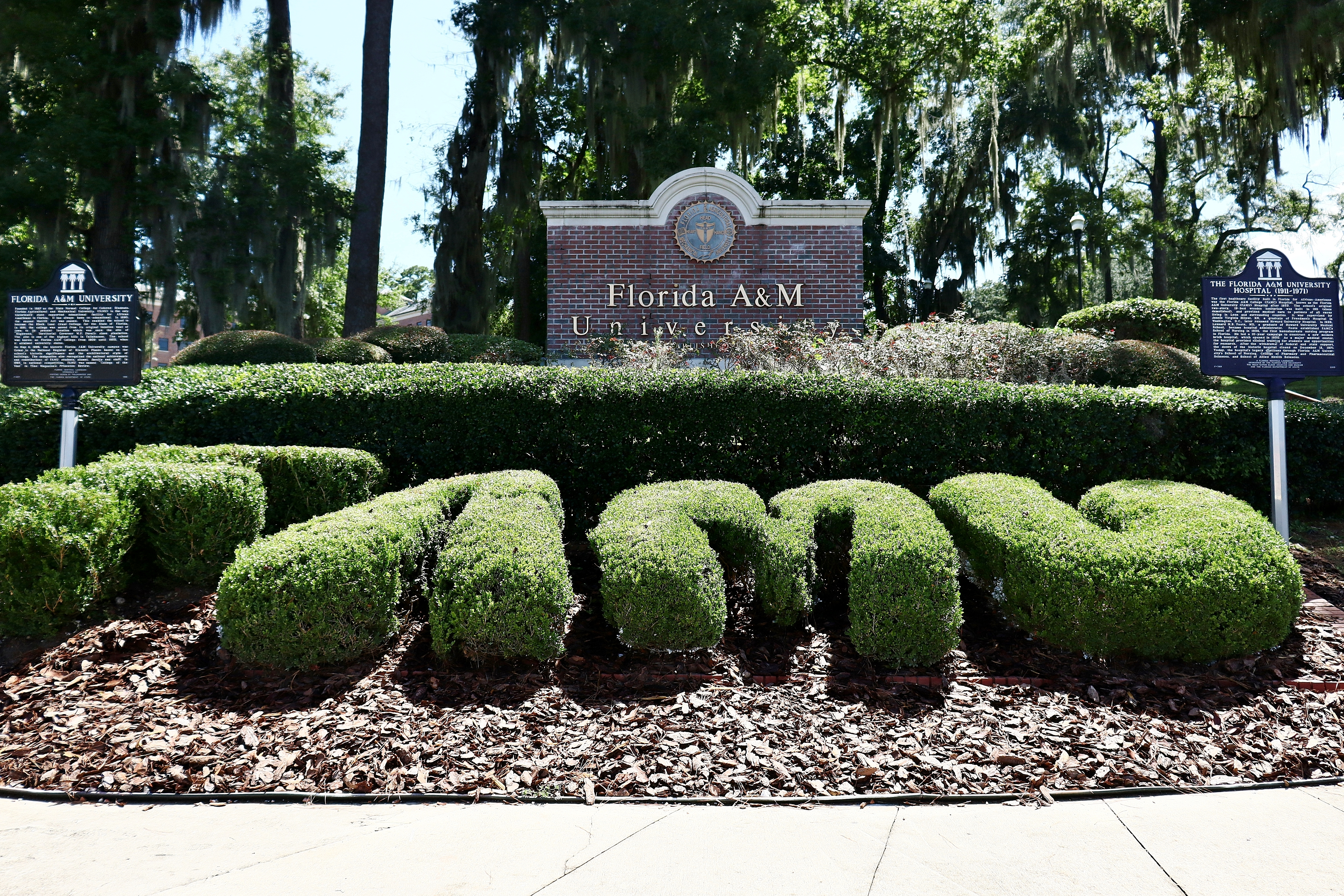
FAMU campus in Tallahassee

Florida A&M's main campus is in Tallahassee, Florida, just south of the State Capitol and the campus of Florida State University. It also has a law school campus in Orlando, Florida, and the Research and Development Center in Quincy, Florida. The College of Pharmacy has extension campuses in Miami, Jacksonville, Tampa and Crestview, Florida.

=== Residential facilities ===
Florida A&M requires all first-year students to live on campus, if their families are over 35 miles (56 km) from the FAMU campus. Exceptions to this rule include married students, students with dependents, and students who are of age 21 by the start of classes.

Florida A&M's residential living community consists of eleven on-campus residence halls housing over 3,400 students. The university offers a diverse number of living options including traditional dorms, suite-style halls, and on-campus apartments. In 2020, FAMU opened the FAMU Towers, a residence hall offering co-ed floors and 700 double rooms, in close proximity to campus eatery, The Hub. In 2025, FAMU opened the 700-bed Venom Landing.

=== National historic district ===
- Florida Agricultural and Mechanical College Historic District
- U.S. National Register of Historic Places
- U.S. Historic district
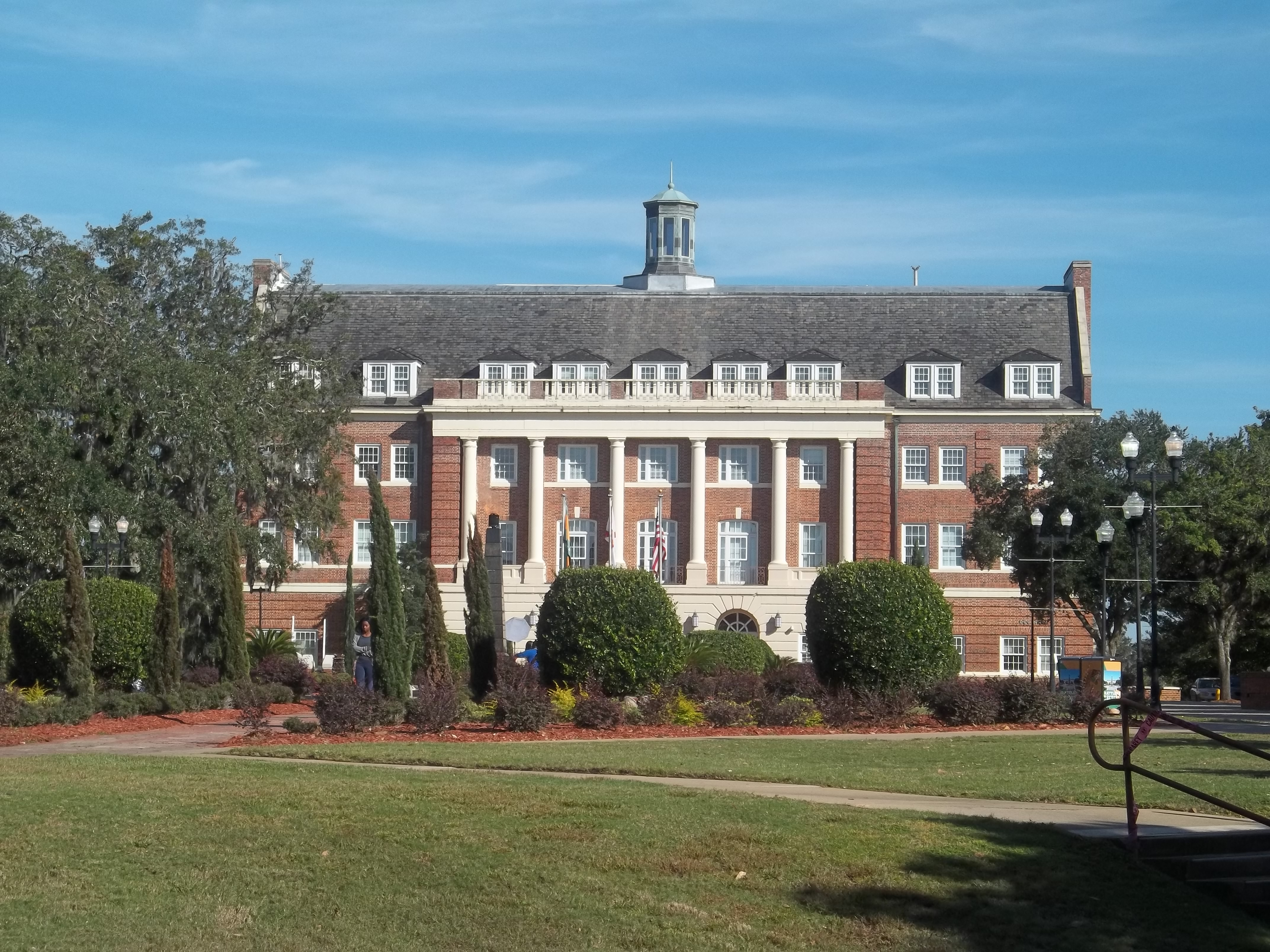
- FAMU campus, Lee Hall

- Location within Florida Location within the United States
- Location: Tallahassee, Florida
- Area: 370 acres (1.5 km^{2})
- Built: 1907
- Architects: William Augustus Edwards; Rudolph Weaver, et al.
- Architectural style: Colonial Revival, Classical Revival
- NRHP reference No.: 96000530
- Added to NRHP: May 9, 1996

The Florida A&M Tallahassee Campus consists of 132 buildings spread across 420 acres (1.7 km^{2}). Part of the campus is listed on the U.S. National Register of Historic Places as the Florida Agricultural and Mechanical College Historic District. It received that designation on May 9, 1996. The district is centered along the section of Martin Luther King Boulevard that goes through the campus. According to the National Register, it covers 370 acres (1.5 km^{2}), and contains 14 historic buildings and 1 object. One campus building, the old Carnegie Library, is listed separately on the National Register. On April 18, 2012, the AIA's Florida Chapter placed Lee Hall at Florida A&M on its list of Florida Architecture: 100 Years. 100 Places.

=== Research centers and institutes ===
The Division of Research houses 17 different research centers and institutes:

- Center for Biological Control
- Center for Disability Access and Resources
- Center for Environmental Equity and Justice
- Environmental Cooperative Sciences Center (ECSC)
- Center for Intelligent Systems, Control, and Robotics (CISCOR)
- Center for International Agricultural Trade, Developmentg Research and Training
- Center for International Law and Justice
- Center for Plasma Science and Technology
- Center for Viticulture Science and Small Fruit Research
- Center for Water and Air Quality
- Center for Secure Computing and Information Assistance
- Meek-Eaton Southeastern Regional Black Archives Research Center and Museum
- Small Business Development Center
- Institute for Building Sciences
- Juvenile Justice Research Institute
- Institute for Research in Music and Entertainment Industry Studies
- Institute of Public Health

=== Libraries ===
The Samuel H. Coleman Memorial Library is the university's main library, named for the man who served as the university's general alumni president for 14 years. After the university's main building containing administrative offices, cafeteria, and library were destroyed by fire, Andrew Carnegie donated a $10,000 gift for the construction of a new library facility. The construction of Coleman Library began during the post-World War II era. The new library was officially dedicated during FAMU's 1949 annual Founders Day celebration in honor of civil leader Samuel H. Coleman. The library was built in 1948, renovated in 1972, expanded in 1990 and again in 2004. The 88,964 square feet (8,265.0 m^{2}) facility includes study rooms, a student study lounge and cafe, graduate and faculty study carrels, teleconference rooms, and a state-of-the-art information literacy classroom.

The libraries hold nearly 2 million volumes, over 155,000 e-books and e-journals, and 256,126 microforms.

=== Carnegie Library ===
The library of what was then the State Normal and Industrial College for Colored Students was located in the grandest building on the campus, Duval Hall, the former mansion of Florida governor William Pope Duval, which also held the university's administrative offices and cafeteria. It was destroyed by fire in 1905. Andrew Carnegie donated a $10,000 gift for the construction of a new library facility. In 1907, when the city of Tallahassee turned down philanthropist Andrew Carnegie's offer of a library building, because by his rules it would have had to serve black patrons, Carnegie funded instead the Carnegie Library at FAMU. It no longer serves as a library, but instead houses the Southeastern Regional Black Archives Research Center and Museum.

== Athletics ==
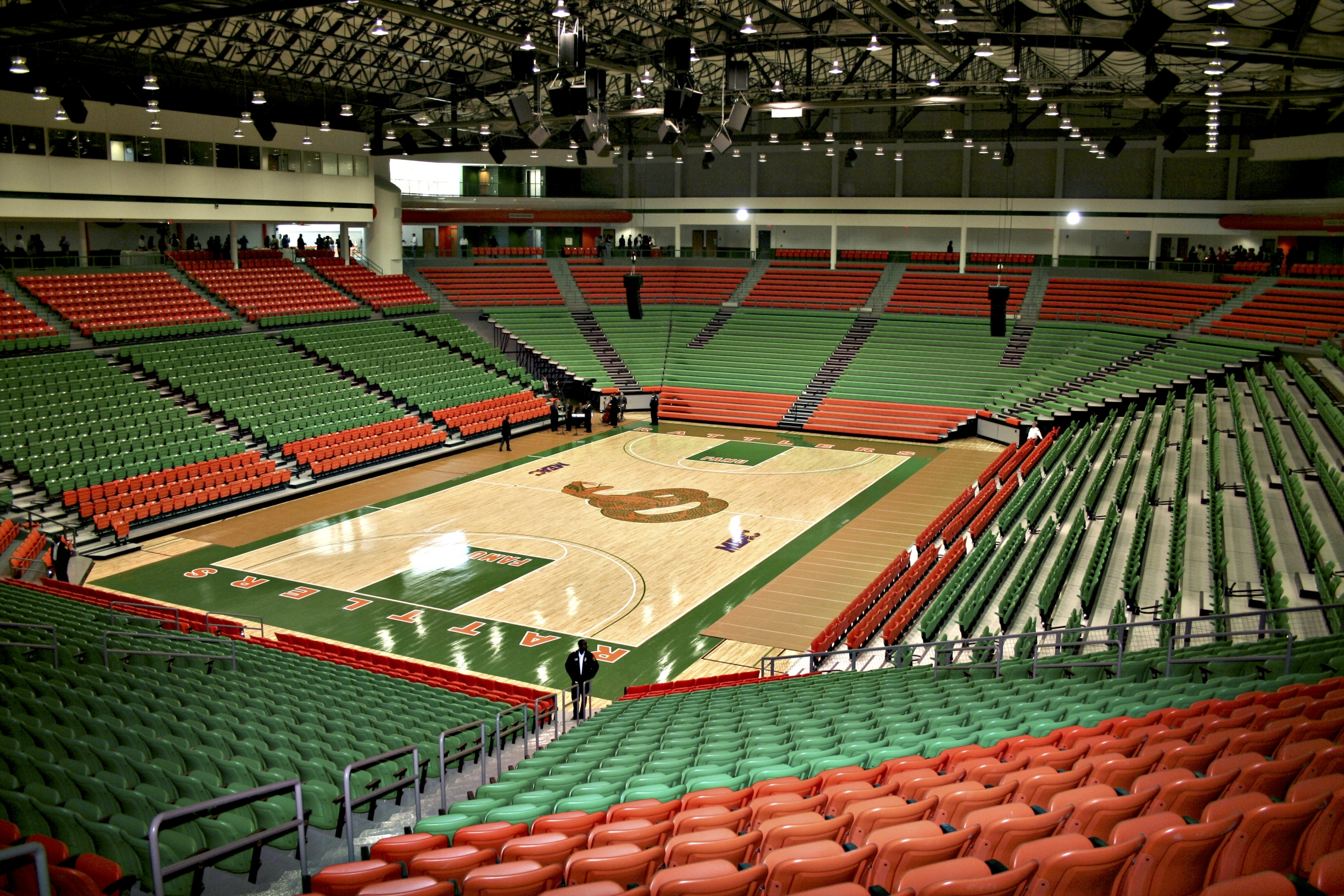
Al Lawson Center, a multi-purpose venue opened in 2009 and home of FAMU basketball and volleyball

Florida A&M University is a member of the Southwestern Athletic Conference and participates in NCAA Division I-FCS. FAMU's sports teams are called the Rattlers. FAMU offers men's sports in baseball, basketball, cross country, football, golf, tennis and track and field. It offers women's sports in basketball, bowling, cheerleading, cross country, softball, tennis, track and field and volleyball.

From 1938 to 1961, the football team won the Black College National Championship eight times, including six times under head coach Jake Gaither, in 1950, 1952, 1954, 1957, 1959 and 1961. When Gaither retired after 25 years of coaching in 1969, his FAMU teams had a 203-36-4 (wins-losses-ties) record, for a .844 winning percentage. Thirty-six players from Gaither's teams were All-Americans, and 42 went on to play in the National Football League. During his 25 years as head coach, FAMU won 22 Southern Intercollegiate Athletic Conference championships. Gaither was elected to the College Football Hall of Fame in 1975. FAMU went on to win the first NCAA D1-AA National Championship in 1978 after defeating the University of Massachusetts Amherst.

The men's basketball team has qualified for the opening round game of the NCAA men's basketball tournament three times (1999, 2004 and 2007).

== Student life ==
FAMU is one of the largest HBCUs in the nation with a student body of nearly 10,000 students hailing from all regions of the United States and several foreign countries. Individuals part of the FAMU community are affectionately referred to as "FAMUly" or members of "Rattler Nation". FAMU has over 100 student organizations on campus.

=== Notable student organizations ===
==== Student Government Association ====
The Student Government Association (SGA) is the official voice of the student body and is divided into three branches: Executive, Judicial, and Legislative.

==== FAMU Royal Court ====
Miss FAMU, Mister FAMU, and other students represent the university in its royal court. Miss FAMU, Mister FAMU, and female students known as "attendants", are elected by the student body; there are one each of freshman, sophomore, junior, senior, and graduate attendants and a queen of "orange and green". The male "escorts" of the attendants are appointed by Mister FAMU through an application process. The only male escort that wears a crown besides Mister FAMU is the king of "orange and green". The attendants and escorts are undergraduate students, except for one attendant and one escort who are graduate students.

==== Gospel Choir ====
The FAMU Gospel Choir was established in 1957.

==== Reserve Officers Training Corps ====
FAMU is home to both Army ROTC and Naval ROTC units, permitting students to pursue careers as commissioned officers in the U.S. Army, U.S. Navy, and U.S. Marine Corps, upon graduation. For those FAMU students desiring to become commissioned officers in the U.S. Air Force, a cross-campus arrangement permits their taking Air Force ROTC training with the AFROTC detachment at nearby Florida State University (FSU). Likewise, Florida State students desiring to become Navy and Marine Corps officers may also enroll with FAMU's NROTC unit under a similar arrangement.

==== Marching band ====
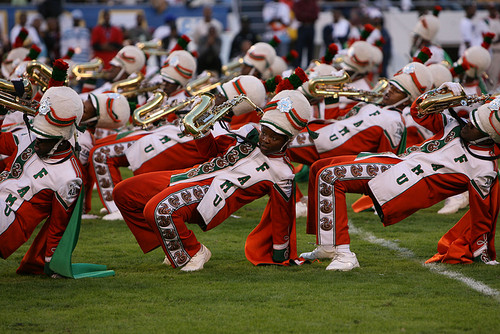
The FAMU Marching 100

The FAMU marching band, the Marching 100, received national recognition in January 1993 when it performed in the 42nd presidential inauguration parade by invitation of Bill Clinton. The band has also performed in the Super Bowl and in the 44th presidential inauguration parade for Barack Obama. In 2019, the marching band performed in the Rose Parade in Pasadena, California, on New Year's Day.

==== Student media ====
- The FAMUAN – The student newspaper
- Journey Magazine – The student magazine
- FAMU 20 TV – The FAMU TV news broadcast network
- WANM 90.5 FM – The university owned and operated radio station.

== Notable alumni ==
- Cannonball Adderley (born 1928) music educator and one of the most pre-eminent prestigious jazz saxophonists in jazz history, performed on the pivotal album Kind of Blue with Miles Davis
- Keisha Lance Bottoms (born 1970), in 2026, elected as first Black woman governor in the U.S. (Governor of Georgia); attorney and politician who served as the 60th mayor of Atlanta, Georgia, from 2018 to 2022
- Karamo Brown (born 1980), host of Queer Eye
- Janelle Bynum (born 1975), politician, electrical engineer, and businesswoman who serves as the representative from Oregon's 5th congressional district in the U.S. Congress.
- Common (rapper) (born 1972), known by his stage name Common (also known as Common Sense), is rapper and actor
- Andre Dawson (born 1954), 8-time National League All-Star, NL MVP, and Baseball Hall of Fame inductee
- Byron Donalds (born 1978), politician and financial analyst who serves as the representative from Florida's 19th congressional district in the U.S. Congress and newly elected governor of Florida.
- Stacey Finley, American science professor
- Althea Gibson (born 1927), first African American to win a Grand Slam title (the French Championships). In all, she won 11 Grand Slam tournaments: five singles titles, five doubles titles, and one mixed doubles title.
- Andrew Gillum (born 1979), nominee for governor of Florida from the Democratic Party and 126th mayor of Tallahassee, Florida
- Kimberly Godwin, former professor at Florida A&M University. In April 2021, Godwin was named president of ABC News. She is the first Black woman to lead a major American network's broadcast news division
- Al Green (Born 1947) politician who serves as the U.S. representative from Texas' 9th congressional district since 2005.
- Bob Hayes (born 1942), only athlete to win both an Olympic gold medal and a Super Bowl ring. He was once considered the "world's fastest human" by virtue of his multiple world records in the 60-yard, 100-yard, 220-yard, and Olympic 100-meter dashes.
- Frederick S. Humphries (born 1935), eighth president of Florida A&M University from June 1, 1985, to December 31, 2001. Under the Humphries administration, FAMU was selected as "College of the Year" by the TIME/Princeton Review in 1997 and recognized in the State University System as a Comprehensive/Doctoral University in 1999.
- Ibram X Kendi (born 1982), author, professor, anti-racist activist, and historian of race and discriminatory policy in America
- T'Keyah Crystal Keymáh (born 1962), actress and singer
- Bernard Kinsey (born 1943), Los Angeles philanthropist and entrepreneur with a passion for African-American history and art of the 19th and 20h centuries
- Shirley Kinsey (born 1946), Los Angeles-based philanthropist, art collector, and former school teacher known, along with husband Bernard and son Khalil, as the owner of Kinsey Collection, one of the largest private collections of African-American history and art in the world.
- Al Lawson (born 1948), politician who served as the U.S. representative for Florida's 5th congressional district, serving from 2017 to 2023
- K. Michelle (born 1982), R&B singer, songwriter, and television personality
- Sidney August Anthony Miller Jr., publisher of Black Radio Exclusive magazine, BRE Radio Conference
- Sybil C. Mobley (born 1925), founding dean of Florida A&M University'sSchool of Business and Industry. Mobley served on the boards of directors of Anheuser-Busch Company, Champion International Corporation, Hershey Foods Corporation, Sears Roebuck & Company, Southwestern Bell Corporation, Dean Witter, and Discover.
- Pam Oliver (born 1960/1961), sportscaster known for her work on the sidelines for various National Basketball Association (NBA) and National Football League (NFL) games
- Will Packer (born 1974), film producer often known for hit big-screen comedies including Think Like a Man (2012), Ride Along (2014), Think Like a Man Too (2014), The Wedding Ringer (2015), Girls Trip (2017), Night School (2018), and What Men Want (2019)
- Sylvia Lyons Render (1913–1986), English professor and manuscript curator at the Library of Congress; first African American to receive a doctoral degree from the Vanderbilt Peabody College of Education and Human Development
- Ken Riley (1947–2020), cornerback with the Cincinnati Bengals for 14 years
- Anika Noni Rose (born 1972), actress and singer. She is best known for voicing Tiana, Disney's first African-American princess, as seen in The Princess and the Frog (2009). She was named a Disney Legend in 2011
- David Scott (Georgia politician) (born 1945), politician and businessman who has served as the U.S. representative for Georgia's 13th congressional district since 2003
- Winsome Sinclair (1965–2024), casting director and film producer
- E. Lilyan Spencer (1906–1957), tennis player, basketball coach and principal. Winner of the 1937 women's doubles national ATA tennis championship.
- Amin Stevens (born 1990), basketball player in the Israeli Basketball Premier League
- John W. Thompson (born 1949), technology executive who was the chair of Microsoft from 2014 until June 2021
- Ebony Elizabeth Thomas, American writer and educator
- Brian Tyms, Football player in the NFL and CFL, Attorney, Super Bowl Champion XLIX, 2017 Grey Cup Champion
- Roy Wood Jr. (born 1978), comedian, actor, Daily Show correspondent

== Notable faculty ==
- D. Antoinette Handy, flautist and music scholar
- Thelma Thurston Gorham (serving 1963-1992), founding member of the Journalism initiative of FAMU

== See also ==
- List of Florida Agricultural and Mechanical University alumni
- Florida Classic
