= List of Florida Agricultural and Mechanical University alumni =

The following is a list of notable people associated with Florida A&M University, located in the American city of Tallahassee, Florida. Florida A&M University is a public, four-year, historically black university located in Tallahassee, Florida. It is one of eleven institutions in Florida's State University System.

== Education ==
Name	Class year	Notability	References
James H. Ammons		former president of Florida A&M University	
Castell V. Bryant		former interim president of Florida A&M University	
Meredith Clark		professor of Media Studies at University of Virginia	
Blanche G. Ely		school principal, Broward County. See Ely Educational Museum	
Fred Gainous		former president of Florida A&M University	
Tameka Bradley Hobbs		associate provost of Florida Memorial University, historian and author	
Frederick S. Humphries		former president of Florida A&M University	

== Business and philanthropy ==
Name	Class year	Notability	References
Raymond A. Brown		attorney whose clients included Black Liberation Army member Assata Shakur and "Dr. X" physician Mario Jascalevich	
Arthur R. Collins	1982	founding partner of the theGROUP, a strategy, policy and communications firm established in 2011 in Washington, D.C.; former president and CEO of Public Private Partnership, Inc., an independent strategic planning and political consulting firm founded in Tallahassee, FL in 1989; former chairman of the Board of Trustees of Florida A&M University	
John W. Thompson	1971	chairman and former president and CEO, Symantec Corporation; former VP, IBM; part owner of the Golden State Warriors	

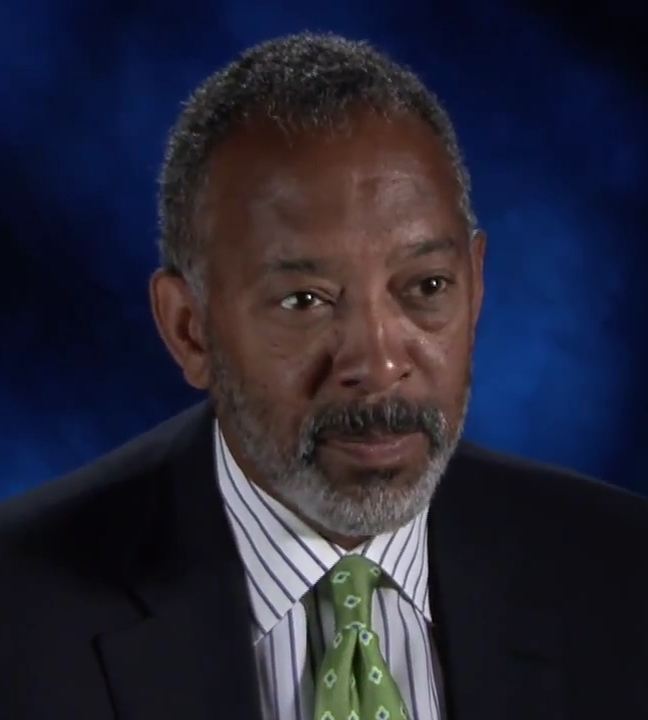
John W. Thompson

== Politics, judicial, and public service ==
Name	Class year	Notability	References
Keisha Lance Bottoms	1995	second female mayor of Atlanta	
Corrine Brown	1969	former U.S. congresswoman	
Melvin Carter		mayor of St. Paul, Minnesota	
Andrew Fahie	1991	premier of the British Virgin Islands	
Wilkie D. Ferguson	1960	former judge who served on the United States District Court for the Southern District of Florida, the Florida Third District Court of Appeal and the 11th Judicial Circuit Court of Florida	
Andrew Gillum		mayor of Tallahassee, Florida	
Alcee L. Hastings		former U.S. congressman	
Joseph Woodrow Hatchett	1954	first African-American to serve on the Supreme Court of Florida	
Mia Jones	1991	former member of the Florida House of Representatives	
Kwame Kilpatrick	1992	former mayor of Detroit, Michigan	
Alfred Lawson, Jr.		current member of the U.S. House of Representatives	
Jesse J. McCrary, Jr.		lawyer and civil rights activist, former secretary of state of Florida, the first black member of the Florida cabinet since Reconstruction	
Carrie P. Meek	1946	former U.S. congresswoman	
Kendrick Meek	1989	former U.S. congressman	
Diallo Vincent Rabain	1995	former Opposition Senate leader; current member of Parliament and minister of Education and Workforce Development Legislature of Bermuda	
Alzo Reddick		former member of the Florida House of Representatives	
David Scott		current U.S. representative from Georgia's 13th congressional district	

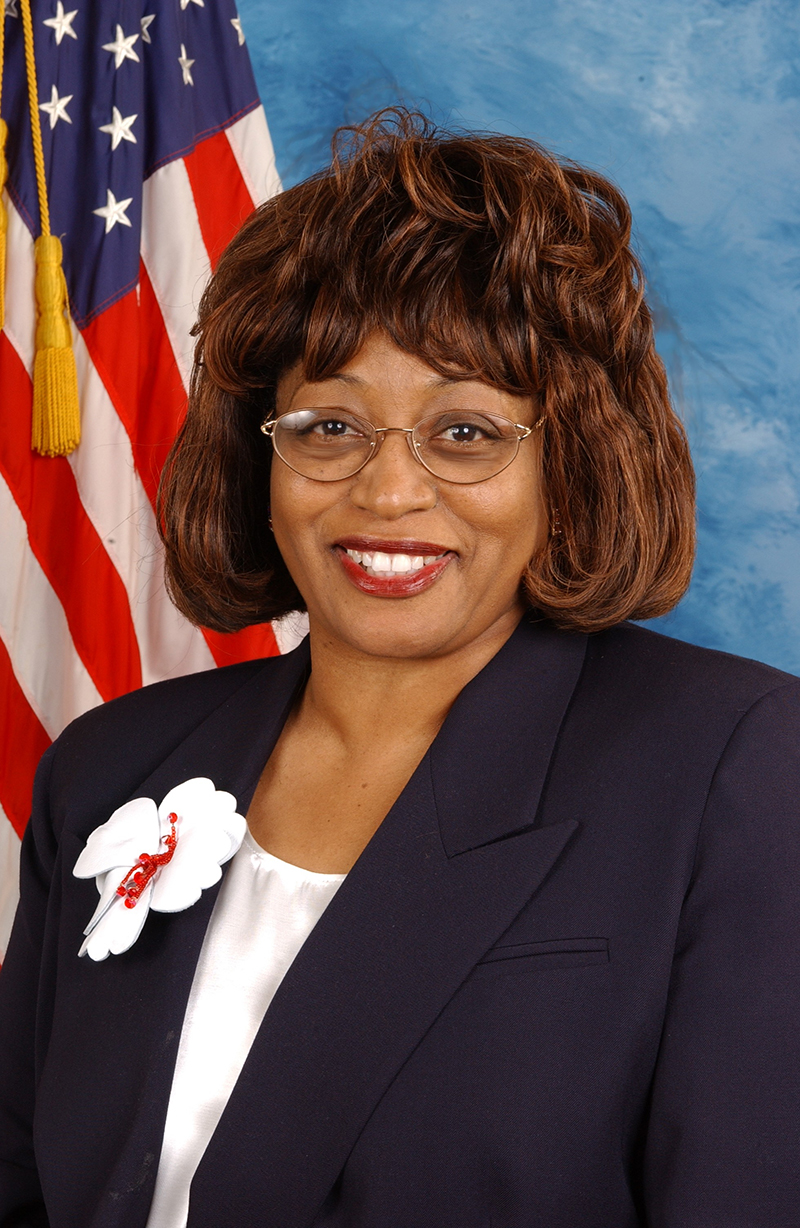
Corrine Brown

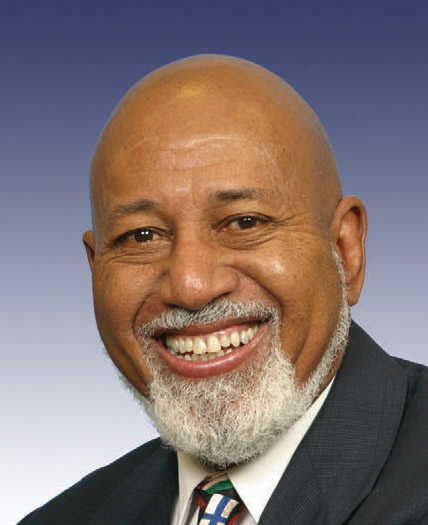
Alcee Hastings

== Entertainment ==
=== Athletics ===
Name	Class year	Notability	References
Gene Atkins		former NFL player	
Jamie Brown		former NFL offensive tackle	
Greg Coleman		NFL punter	
Vince Coleman		former MLB player	
Andre Dawson		former MLB player; member of the Major League Baseball Hall of Fame	
Hewritt Dixon		former NFL player	
Glen Edwards		former NFL player	
Kevin Elliott		NFL player	
Willie Galimore		former NFL player	
Althea Gibson	1953	tennis player	
Quinn Gray		NFL quarterback	
Marquis Grissom		MLB player	
Bob Hayes		football player, Olympic gold medalist	
Earl Holmes		former NFL player and current linebackers coach at FAMU	
Jerome James		NBA player	
Clemon Johnson		former NBA player	
Meadowlark Lemon		former Harlem Globetrotter	
Hal McRae		former MLB player and manager	
Terry Mickens		former NFL wide receiver	
Jamie Nails		former NFL offensive tackle	
Nate Newton		former NFL offensive tackle	
Dexter Nottage		former NFL player	
Dan Parrish		NFL player	
Casey Printers		CFL quarterback	
Ken Riley		former NFL player and a member of the Pro Football Hall of Fame	
Wally Williams		former NFL player	

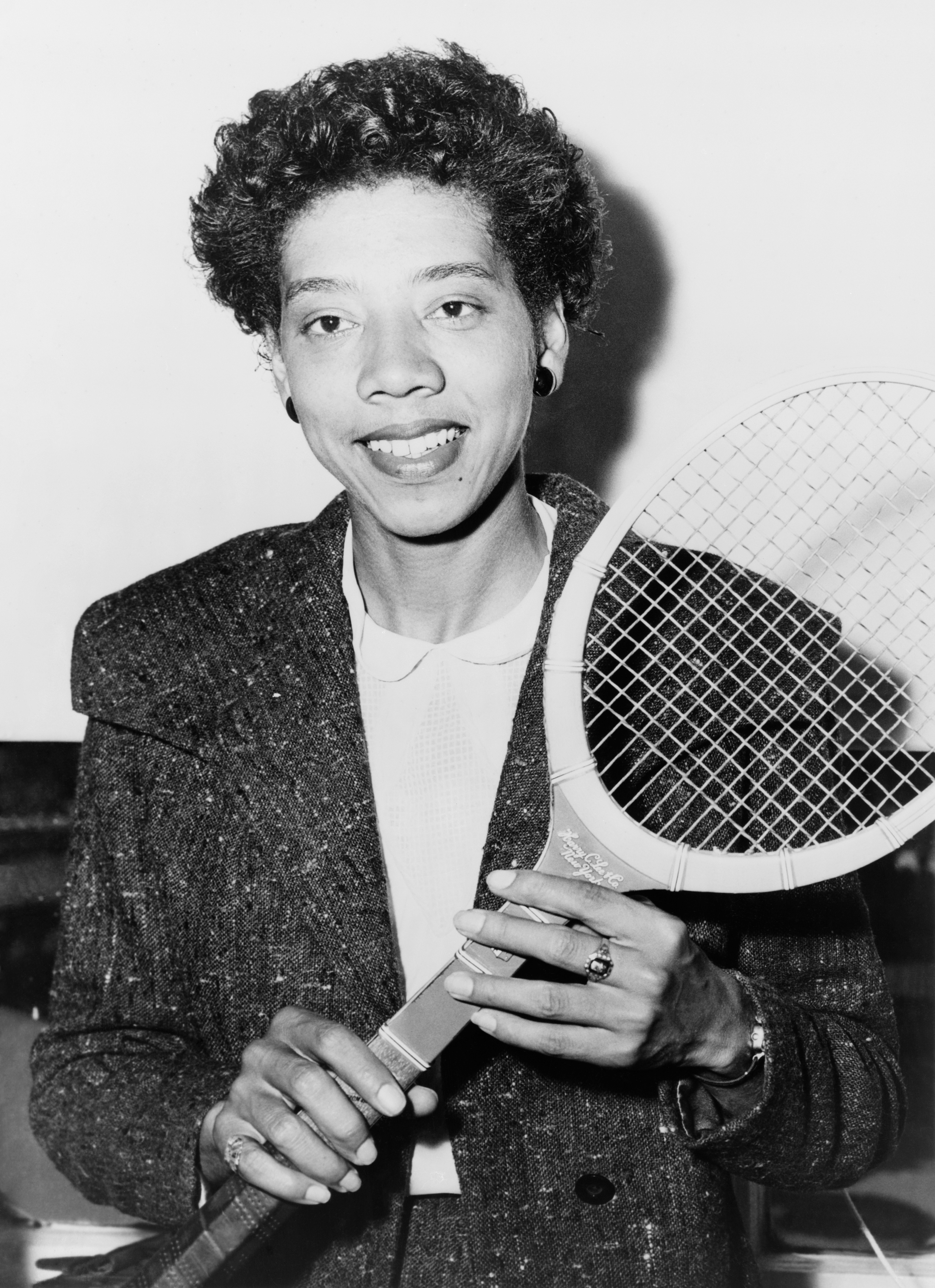
Althea Gibson

=== Film, television, and performing arts ===
Name	Class year	Notability	References
Rob Hardy		film producer (Rainforest Productions)	
T'Keyah Crystal Keymah		actress	
Mitzi Miller		journalist and tv executive	
Pam Oliver		sports anchor	
William Packer		film producer (Rainforest Productions)	
Angela Pitts		contestant on Flavor of Love 3 and winner of I Love Money 2	
Angela Robinson		actress	
Anika Noni Rose		Tony Award-winning actress	
Peyton Alex Smith		actor	
Daniel Sunjata		actor	
Meshach Taylor	1993	actor	
Roy Wood, Jr.		comedian and radio personality	

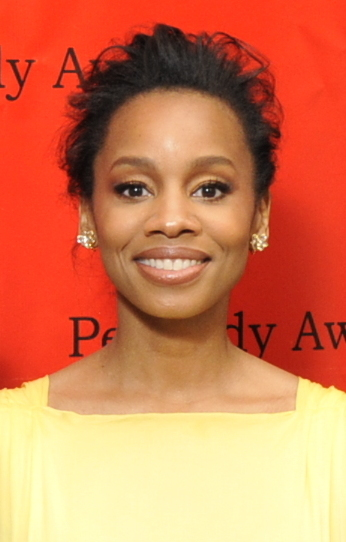
Anika Noni Rose

=== Music ===
Name	Class year	Notability	References
Julian "Cannonball" Adderley		jazz alto saxophonist	
Nat Adderley		jazz cornetist	
Scotty Barnhart		jazz trumpeter	
Tabi Bonney		rapper	
Common	attended	rapper and entertainer	
K.Michelle		R&B singer	
Rico Love		songwriter and rapper	
M-1		real name Mutulu Olugabala, member of hip-hop group Dead Prez	
Smitty	attended	rapper and producer	
stic.man		real name Clayton Gavin, member of hip-hop group Dead Prez	

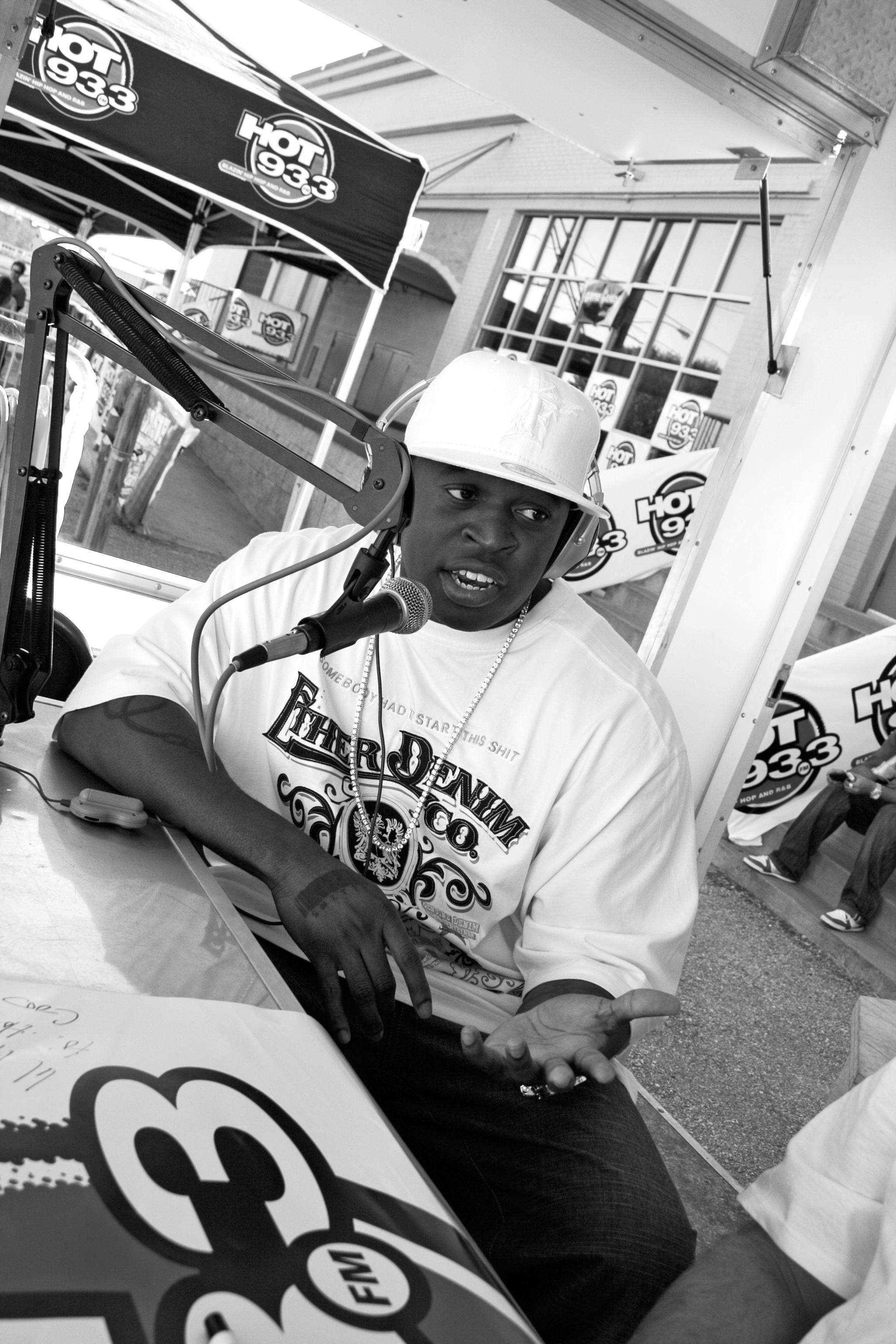
Smitty

== Other notable alumni ==
Name	Class year	Notability	References
Ibram X. Kendi	2004	author, historian	
Bernard Kinsey		owner of one of the largest African-American art collections	
Jami Valentine Miller, Ph.D.	1996	physicist; founder of African American Women in Physics, Inc.	

== See also ==
- Florida A&M University alumni
