= Dillard High School =

Public middle and high school in Fort Lauderdale, Florida, United States

Location
- 2501 NW 11th St; Fort Lauderdale, Florida 33311-5796; United States; 26.1389746°N 80.1753241°W

Information
- Type: Public, Magnet
- Established: 1907
- School district: Broward County Public Schools
- Superintendent: Dr. Peter B. Licata
- Principal: Alfred Broomfield II
- Teaching staff: 90.00 (FTE)
- Grades: 6–12
- Enrollment: 1,998 (2024–2025)
- Student to teacher ratio: 22.20
- Colors: Blue and Grey
- Team name: Panthers
- Information: (754) 322-0800
- Website: https://dillard612.browardschools.com/

Dillard High School is a historic public middle and high school located in Fort Lauderdale, Florida. The school was established in 1907 as Colored School 11 and was later named for black-education advocate James H. Dillard. It is a part of Broward County Public Schools.

Dillard is available to all of Broward County. The school is a magnet school for Emerging Computer Technology and Performing Arts.

Dillard serves sections of Fort Lauderdale for middle school and sections of Fort Lauderdale and Lauderhill for high school.

Dillard has an FCAT school grade of "A" for the 2013–2014 academic year.

== Magnet programs ==
=== Performing arts ===
As the first public school for people of African descent in Ft. Lauderdale, Dillard High School incorporated two magnet programs in an effort to integrate and expand the educational horizons of this historic school.

Dillard Center for the Arts (DCA) provides training in dance, music, theater, and visual arts, as well as an academic schedule. Students must demonstrate ability and interest in one of the four artistic areas and exhibit academic potential. Such programs within the music department were keyboard, voice, band, orchestra and commercial music. The chorus, chorale, gospel choir, jazz band and rock band performs in Broward county and the Fort Lauderdale community and their students perform at the local, state, and national levels. Graduates of the magnet program go on to attend some of the top colleges and conservatory programs in the United States, including the Juilliard School of Music, Manhattan School of Music, and Columbia University.

=== Emerging computer technology ===
The Emerging computer technology offers courses in digital media, computer programming, robotics, and electronic technology hardware/network support. In addition, Dillard High School offers many advanced placement and honors courses.

Dillard High School also offers an award-winning robotics team sponsored by Motorola, Amazon, and Citrix.

== Demographics ==
As of the 2016–2017 school year, the total student enrollment was 2,078. The ethnic makeup of the school was 2.59% White, 90% Black, 5.63% Hispanic, 0.52% Asian or Pacific Islander, 1.10% Multiracial, and 0.09% Native American or Native Alaskan.

== Awards and accolades ==
In 2012, The Dillard Center for the Arts Jazz Ensemble had the honor of performing with jazz great Wynton Marsalis as his demonstration band at the Midwest Clinic in December 2012. In both 2011 and 2012 the Jazz Ensemble won the Essentially Ellington competition of Jazz at Lincoln Center. The band, under the direction of director Christopher Dorsey, by 2015 had made its sixth consecutive appearance in the Big Band Jazz competition. Placing among the top three in the other three years that the group made it into the finals.

== History ==
Dillard's first principal was Joseph A. Ely. When the building, now the Old Dillard Museum, was built in 1924 it was an elementary school; by the time he left in 1937, when he moved to Crispus Attacks High School (today a middle school), he had succeeded in expanding Dillard to include high school classes. He was responsible for getting the school name changed in 1930 to honor James H. Dillard, a white philanthropist, educator, and promoter of education for black children. He was replaced by Clarence C. Walker Sr., who was principal until his death in 1942.

Famed saxophonist Julian Cannonball Adderley became the band director at Dillard High School in Fort Lauderdale in 1948, and worked there until 1950.

Dillard High moved to its present, newly built building in 1950.

In 1967, Fort Lauderdale High School met Dillard in the season opener for both teams. This, along with another game in Broward County between Ely and McArthur the same night, was the first meeting between white and black teams. Prior to the game, the FLHS team members held their own practices as the coaches refused to hold practice.

On Nov. 13, 2008, a 15-year-old student, Amanda Collette, was shot dead in a hallway after rejecting a female student's romantic advances. In March 2010, the shooter was sentenced to 25 years imprisonment.

== Notable alumni ==
Academics

- Chester Seabury - mathematician, lawyer. Attended Dillard before becoming the first African-American to graduate from a white high school in Florida.
- Niara Sudarkasa - anthropologist and first female president of Lincoln University. Graduated Dillard at age 15 and accepted early admission to Fisk University.

Performing artists

- Karen Dyer - Actress
- Elias Soriano – Heavy metal vocalist
- Jason Derulo c/o 2005 – Singer, songwriter
- Kent Jones - Singer, rapper
- Black Violin – Innovative string duo
- Mickey Zetts – Songwriter, playwright
- Josh Smith – Blues guitarist, session musician, and producer
- Urban Mystic – Singer, songwriter, recording artist
- Mike Drucker- American stand-up comedian, writer and producer

NFL

- Matthias Askew – Defensive tackle
- James Bostic – Running back
- Isaac Bruce – Hall of Fame NFL wide receiver (1994-2009) for the Los Angeles/St. Louis Rams and San Francisco 49ers.
- Jonathan Ford – Defensive Lineman (2022-present), (Green Bay Packers, Chicago Bears)
- Chris Gamble – Cornerback (2004-2012 ), (Carolina Panthers)
- Charlie Goodrum – Offensive lineman
- Quinn Gray – Quarterback (2003-2008) (Jacksonville Jaguars, Houston Texans, Indianapolis Colts, Kansas City Chiefs and New York Sentinels of the UFL)
- Jovan Haye – Defensive tackle (2005–2011) Carolina Panthers, Cleveland Browns, Tampa Bay Buccaneers, Tennessee Titans and Detroit Lions
- Louis Holmes – Defensive end (2008) San Francisco 49ers, (2009) Tampa Bay Buccaneers and Sacramento Mountain Lions of the United Football League (2009)
- Percy Howard – Wide receiver (1975), (Dallas Cowboys)
- Calvin Jackson – Cornerback
- Nyjalik Kelly - Linebacker (2026–present), (Green Bay Packers)
- Tron LaFavor – Defensive tackle
- Stanley McClover – Defensive end (2006-2009), (Carolina Panthers, Houston Texans)
- Leonard Myers – Cornerback
- Bryce Oliver – Wide receiver
- Jim Osborne – Defensive tackle
- Randy Ramsey - NFL Linebacker
- Frank Sanders – Wide receiver (1995–2003) Arizona Cardinals and Baltimore Ravens
- Joshua Shaw – Defensive Lineman (1991–1996), (San Francisco 49ers, Denver Broncos, New Orleans Saints, Miami Dolphins)
- Pat Sims – Defensive tackle (2008–2017) Cincinnati Bengals
- Herman Smith – Defensive end
- Brian Tyms – Wide receiver
- Lorenzo White – Running back (1988–1995), (Houston Oilers and Cleveland Browns)

NBA

- Keyon Dooling c/o 1998 – Basketball player (2000–2013) Los Angeles Clippers, Miami Heat, Orlando Magic, New Jersey Nets, Milwaukee Bucks, Boston Celtics, and Memphis Grizzlies

Euro Basket

- Mistoria Brown – Basketball player (2007–2009) Turkey
- Briana Green – Basketball player (2019–2021) Ireland, Greece, Portugal
- Nigel Spikes - basketball player

Former Faculty

- Julian Edwin Cannonball Adderley – Jazz alto saxophonist
