= Dou Innocent =

American football player (born 1972)

No. 28
- Position: Running back

Personal information
- Born: July 9, 1972 (age 54); Pompano Beach, Florida, U.S.
- Listed height: 5 ft 11 in (1.80 m)
- Listed weight: 212 lb (96 kg)

Career information
- High school: Blanche Ely (Pompano Beach)
- College: Ole Miss (1991–1995)
- NFL draft: 1996: undrafted

Career history
- Seattle Seahawks (1996)
- Stats at Pro Football Reference

Doudow Innocent (born July 9, 1972) is an American former professional football player who was a running back for one season with the Seattle Seahawks of the National Football League (NFL). He played college football for the Ole Miss Rebels.

== Early life ==
Doudow Innocent was born on July 9, 1972, in Pompano Beach, Florida. He was given the name Doudow by his father and it was later shortened to Dou by an elementary school teacher. Innocent said "My dad gave me the name. I don't know where he got it. My teacher cut it down and everybody started calling me Dou." He attended Blanche Ely High School in Pompano Beach. He rushed 251 times for 1,493 yards and 21 touchdowns his senior year in 1990. Despite being a running back, he was named to the 1990 Parade All-American team as a wide receiver.

== College career ==
Innocent was a member of the Ole Miss Rebels of the University of Mississippi from 1991 to 1995. He was a letterman in 1991, 1992, 1994, and 1995. He was academically ineligible in 1993. Innocent rushed 67 times for 327 yards and one touchdown as a freshman in 1991 while also catching four passes for 12 yards. In 1992, he recorded 53 carries for 217 yards and one touchdown, and two catches for 69 yards. In 1994, Innocent totaled 182 rushing attempts for a team-leading 910 yards and four touchdowns, and 24 receptions for 206 yards and one touchdown. As a senior in 1995, he rushed 192 times for a team-leading 868 yards and five touchdowns while also catching 12 passes for 105 yards and one touchdown. He also missed two and a half games that year due to a broken hand. He set the school's single-game rushing record with 242 yards in his final college game. Innocent's 2,322 career rushing yards were second in school history at the time. He also set school records for most career carries with 494 and consecutive games with 100 rushing yards with eight. Innocent was invited to the Blue–Gray Football Classic and the Senior Bowl.

== Professional career ==
Innocent was rated the seventh best fullback in the 1996 NFL draft by The Record. After going undrafted, he signed with the Seattle Seahawks on June 3. He was released on August 20 and signed to the practice squad on August 26. Innocent was promoted to the active roster on November 29 and played in four games for the Seahawks during the 1996 season. He was released by the Seahawks on August 19, 1997.
