= Wayne Caines =

Bermudian lawyer and politician (born 1970)

The Honourable Wayne Caines MP

Minister of National Security
- In office July 2017 – July 2020
- Premier: Edward David Burt
- Preceded by: Jeffrey Baron
- Succeeded by: Diallo Vincent Rabain

Personal details
- Party: Progressive Labour Party

Wayne Caines is a Bermudian politician currently serving as a member of the House of Assembly of Bermuda representing Devonshire North West for the Progressive Labour Party.

Caines served as Minister of National Security from July 2017 until his resignation in July 2020.

== Education and career ==
Caines is a graduate of Oakwood University in Huntsville, Alabama, the University of Kent and the Royal Military Academy Sandhurst.

Prior to entering politics, Caines served as a Captain within the Bermuda Regiment, Crown Counsel at the Department of Public Prosecutions, and CEO of SENIAC Consulting.

== Political career ==
Prior to entering Parliament, Caines was Chief of Staff in the Office of the Premier. He then served as a Progressive Labour Party Senator, becoming Junior Minister of Tourism, Transport, Environment and Sport.

Following the Progressive Labour Party victory at the 2017 election, in which Caines was re-elected as member for Devonshire North West, Caines was appointed as Minister of National Security. Caines was re-elected on 2020.

== Controversy ==
In the Fall of 2018, Caines visited London for Government related purposes and was involved in an incident of notoriety at a Cereal Killer Cafe chain. At the establishment when ordering his cereal, Caines asked the female worker if they had "any titty milk?". Despite issuing an apology for his unprofessional behaviour and clear sexual harassment, nothing was done by the Progressive Labour Party to punish Caines over the matter. He continued to hold his position as Minister of National Security.
