= Coleman Elementary School =

There are schools named Coleman Elementary School in several U.S. states:

- Coleman Elementary School (Arkansas) in Pine Bluff, Arkansas
- Coleman Intermediate School, formerly known as Coleman Elementary School, in Pine Bluff, Arkansas
- Coleman Elementary School (Elgin, Illinois)
- Coleman Elementary School (Wisconsin) in North Coleman, Wisconsin
- Coleman Elementary School, part of the San Rafael City Schools district in San Rafael, California
- Pompano Colored School, later known as Coleman Elementary School (Pompano Beach, Florida) in Pompano, Florida
