= Laura Purser-Rose =

American former professional baseball player

Laura Purser-Rose (née Purser; born 1974) is an American former professional baseball player. As a member of the Colorado Silver Bullets, Purser-Rose was the first woman to sign her name on the Green Monster at Fenway Park. She was also one of the first players for the United States women's national baseball team.

== Early life ==
Purser-Rose was born in 1974 in Sunrise, Florida. Growing up in South Florida, she was only allowed to play slow-pitch softball but she practiced baseball with her older brothers. However, when her family moved to Alabama, she played on the boys' baseball team where she was named MVP twice.

== Playing career ==
=== Youth career ===
Purser-Rose attended McArthur High School where she led its women's softball team to two state championships and earned a scholarship to Barry University. While attending McArthur High School, Purser-Rose also played midfielder for the girls' soccer team but was moved to goalkeeper in the District 14-3A championship game to replace an injured teammate. During her sophomore year, she fractured her hip sliding into first base during a game against South Broward. Although the doctor told her she would be out for six weeks, she returned within three and led the Mustangs with a .556 average and 24 RBI. Her play earned her scholarship interest from Tallahassee Community College, Miami-Dade North, St Thomas University and Barry University. She was named to the 3A all-state softball team by the Florida Athletic Coaches Association and the Miami Herald's Broward Player of the Year.

After graduating from high school, Purser-Rose played NCAA Division III softball at Barry for two years before transferring to the University of Oklahoma. As a junior and senior, she played her final two NCAA seasons of softball and varsity soccer there. She helped lead the softball team to a Big 12 Conference softball tournament championship and was voted to the All-Regional Selection team. She was also named to the first-team all-Big Eight for the 1994–95 season.

=== Professional career ===
As a result of her softball achievements, Purser-Rose was invited to spring training by the women's professional baseball team, the Colorado Silver Bullets. Before joining them, she trained with the Oklahoma Sooners baseball men's team for three weeks. She made the team and played with them for the entirety of the 1997 season. Although she had played softball since a young age, she was required to learn how to pitch in baseball "from scratch". During her rookie season with the Silver Bullets, they toured the United States playing against men's semi-professional teams in big-league parks. Prior to playing in Fenway Park, she asked if a woman had ever signed her name on the inside wall of the Green Monster. Being told not, she became the first woman to sign her name on the wall. In 1999, she was invited to Tokyo to observe and help implement the selection of a Japan women's national baseball team.

Following her rookie season, Purser-Rose played professional baseball for the Durham Dragons and Tampa Bay Firestix. In 2004, she was named to the inaugural roster for the United States women's national baseball team to compete in several tournaments that summer. She pitched their first complete game at the International Baseball Federation World Cup of Women's Baseball against Australia. The following year, she accepted a coaching position with Everglades High School and led the team to a 19–7 record. She left the position in her second year to accept a federal government position.
