= Gonzalo P. Curiel =

American judge (born 1953)

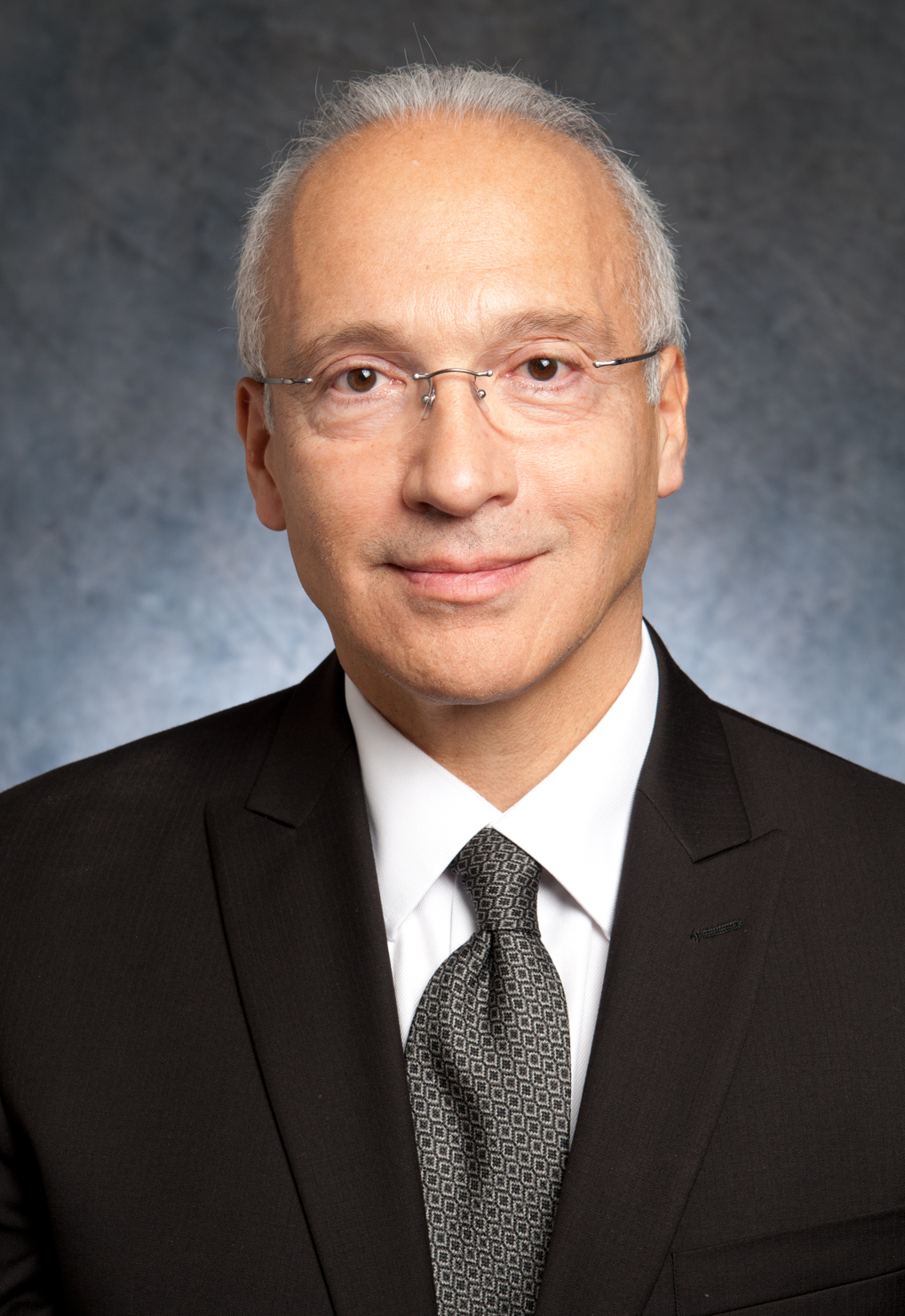

Senior Judge of the United States District Court for the Southern District of California
- Incumbent
- Assumed office September 7, 2023

Judge of the United States District Court for the Southern District of California
- In office October 1, 2012 – September 7, 2023
- Appointed by: Barack Obama
- Preceded by: Thomas J. Whelan
- Succeeded by: Benjamin J. Cheeks

Personal details
- Born: September 7, 1953 (age 73) East Chicago, Indiana, U.S.
- Party: Democratic
- Education: Indiana University (BA, JD)

Gonzalo Paul Curiel (born September 7, 1953) is a Senior United States district judge of the United States District Court for the Southern District of California.

== Early life and education ==
Curiel was born in East Chicago, Indiana, the youngest of four children. His parents, Salvador and Francisca, had emigrated from Mascota, a small Mexican town near Puerto Vallarta in the state of Jalisco. Salvador worked as a laborer in Arizona before moving to Indiana where he worked in the steel mills. (Note: It has been reported that Salvador came to the U.S. through the Bracero program which was established in 1942; Gonzalo's brother Raul says their father became a legal resident prior to the arrival of their mother Francisca in 1946. Raul has also reportedly said that Salvador arrived in the U.S. in the 1920s.) Curiel's parents married in 1946 and later became American citizens.

Curiel graduated from high school at the Bishop Noll Institute. He received his Bachelor of Arts degree from Indiana University in 1976 and his Juris Doctor from the Indiana University School of Law in 1979 and is a member of the fraternity Kappa Alpha Psi.

== Pre-judicial career ==
Curiel worked in private practice, first at James, James & Manning from 1979 to 1986 and then at Barbosa & Vera from 1986 to 1989. He was an Assistant United States Attorney in the Southern District of California from 1989 to 2002. While in the Southern District, he served as Deputy Chief (1996–1999) and then Chief (1999–2002) of the Narcotics Enforcement Division.

During his tenure with the Narcotics Enforcement Division, Curiel handled a case involving two alleged members of the Arellano Felix cartel of Tijuana, Mexico. U.S. law enforcement arrested the two alleged murderers in California, based on information from Mexican authorities, and Curiel sought their extradition to Mexico. The two men objected to extradition by arguing that the information used to track them down had been obtained in Mexico via torture. Curiel argued: "The [U.S.] Government is not here to deny there is a possibility of torture. ... There are serious allegations of torture. But the forum for those allegations to be aired is the Government of Mexico."

While still in United States custody, one of the men allegedly threatened Curiel's life, so that Curiel had to live under federal protection for a time. The extradition case went up to a federal appeals court, with Curiel arguing the case. The appeals court decided that the extradition could proceed, saying that there was enough evidence to support it without using the evidence allegedly obtained via torture. Curiel hailed the ruling, which he said might lead to greater cooperation between the two countries in the fight against the drug cartel.

Curiel then worked as an assistant United States attorney in the Central District of California from 2002 to 2006.

== Judicial career ==
=== California superior court ===
In 2006, Governor Arnold Schwarzenegger appointed Curiel to the San Diego County Superior Court. He held that position until his appointment to the federal bench.

=== Federal judicial service ===
On November 10, 2011, President Barack Obama nominated Curiel to serve as a United States district judge of the United States District Court for the Southern District of California. He replaced Judge Thomas J. Whelan, who had taken senior status. Curiel was rated "well qualified" by a substantial majority of the American Bar Association's Standing Committee on the Federal Judiciary, which evaluates federal judicial nominees.

Curiel received a hearing before the Senate Judiciary Committee on March 28, 2012, which reported his nomination to the Senate on April 26, 2012, by voice vote. In the early hours of September 22, 2012, on what was officially still the legislative day of September 21, the Senate confirmed Curiel by voice vote. He received his commission on October 1, 2012. He assumed senior status on September 7, 2023.

==== Trump University lawsuits ====
In February 2014, Curiel certified Tarla Makaeff v. Trump University as a class action case that alleged Trump University was "a basically fraudulent endeavor", and he accepted residents of three states as members of that class. In October 2014, Curiel certified Cohen v. Trump as another national class action against then-entrepreneur Donald Trump. In March 2016, Curiel allowed Makaeff to withdraw her name from the first lawsuit, and the case was retitled Low v. Trump University.

In May 2016, Curiel granted a request by The Washington Post for public release of certain Trump University documents and depositions that had been filed in the case. Curiel scheduled a trial to begin in the Low case on November 28, 2016, in San Diego. He had planned to start the trial in the summer of 2016, but postponed it until after the 2016 Presidential election because of concerns that jurors would be affected by a "media frenzy" if the trial took place before the election.

In November 2016, after Trump had been elected president, his attorneys asked that the case be delayed until after Trump's inauguration, set for January 20, 2017. Curiel denied the request but urged the parties to pursue a settlement, and recruited District Judge Jeffrey T. Miller to facilitate settlement talks. On November 18 a $25 million settlement of all three pending cases (Curiel's two class-action suits plus a suit filed by the attorney general of New York) was announced and was certified by Curiel. Implementation of the settlement was delayed because one individual claimant wished to pursue a separate lawsuit. A district court and an appeals court rejected that individual's claim, and Curiel finalized the settlement in April 2018. Former students can now get a refund of up to 90% of the money they spent on courses.

During the campaign Trump repeatedly criticized Curiel in campaign speeches and interviews, calling him a "hater of Donald Trump", saying his rulings have been unfair, and that Curiel "happens to be, we believe, Mexican, which is great. I think that's fine", while suggesting that the judge's ethnicity posed a conflict of interest in light of Trump's proposal to build a wall on the U.S.-Mexican border. Curiel wrote in court papers that Trump has "placed the integrity of these court proceedings at issue", but is forbidden from responding publicly to Trump's claims in view of rules against public commentary by judges on active cases.

Legal experts were critical of Trump's original attacks on Curiel, viewing them as racially charged, unfounded, and an affront to the concept of an independent judiciary. On June 7, 2016, Trump issued a lengthy statement saying that his criticism of the judge had been "misconstrued" and that his concerns about Curiel's impartiality were not based upon ethnicity alone, but also upon rulings in the case. In reply, Cato Institute fellow Nat Hentoff wrote that thus far in the case, Curiel had ruled in Trump's favor far more often than not, including granting his motion to delay the trial until after the 2016 presidential election, and concluded that "Donald Trump has an odd way of showing his appreciation for a trial judge who, as his attorney said, is just 'doing his job'." In November 2017 at an appeals court hearing, one of Trump's attorneys said that Trump had changed his opinion of Curiel and now regarded his actions as a "textbook example of a district court properly administering a settlement".

==== DACA lawsuit ====
In April 2017 Curiel was assigned to hear the case of a 23-year-old man whose lawyers say he was deported to Mexico on February 18 by the Border Patrol despite being registered under the Deferred Action for Childhood Arrivals program, having arrived in the United States from Mexico when he was 9 years old. The Department of Homeland Security says he was not deported and must have gone into Mexico from the United States voluntarily at some point. He was caught on February 19 trying to illegally cross the border into the United States from Mexico.

==== U.S.–Mexico border wall case ====
Curiel also heard a case brought by the State of California and California Coastal Commission, a number of environmentalist groups, and U.S. Representative Raúl Grijalva (Democrat of Arizona) that challenged waivers issued in 1996 and 2005 that allowed the federal government to bypass some federal and state environmental laws to promote border security. These waivers were granted under a 1996 immigration law. Three separate lawsuits were initially brought, challenging the U.S. Department of Homeland Security's power to waive these laws to construct a border wall. Curiel consolidated these into a single case, In re Border Infrastructure Environmental Litigation.

The plaintiffs argued that the waivers were ultra vires and not authorized by the 1996 immigration law; they also raised constitutional challenges grounded in the Nondelegation Doctrine, Take Care Clause, Presentment Clause, First Amendment and Tenth Amendment. On February 27, 2018, Curiel granted summary judgment in favor of the Trump administration.

== Memberships ==
Curiel was admitted to the bar in Illinois in 1979, in Indiana in 1980, and in California in 1986.

Curiel is a member of American Bar Association, and served on the ABA's Hispanic Advisory Committee of the Commission on Public Understanding about the Law from 1993 to 1998. He served on the State Bar of California's Criminal Law Advisory Commission from 1994 to 1998, spending one year as chair and another year as vice chair. He also served on the board of directors of the San Diego County Judges Association and was a member of the California Judges Association. He served on the San Diego Superior Court's Domestic Violence Committee from 2007 to 2010. He is a member of the American Inns of Court, William B. Enright Chapter.

Curiel is a member of the San Diego La Raza Lawyers Association, a nonprofit professional association of Latino lawyers that is affiliated with a statewide organization, the La Raza Lawyers of California. Neither these groups nor Curiel are affiliated with the National Council of La Raza (NCLR), an unrelated advocacy group.

On his 2011 questionnaire, Curiel also noted that he was a "life-time member" of the Hispanic National Bar Association, and a member of the National Hispanic Prosecutors Association, as well as the Latino Judges Association.

== Personal life ==
Curiel is married. He and his wife, a court probation officer, have one daughter. She plays jazz guitar.

== See also ==
- List of Hispanic and Latino American jurists

Legal offices
Preceded by Thomas J. Whelan	Judge of the United States District Court for the Southern District of California; 2012–2023	Succeeded by Benjamin J. Cheeks
