= Kester Cottages =

Coordinates: 26°14′1.5″N 80°7′16″W

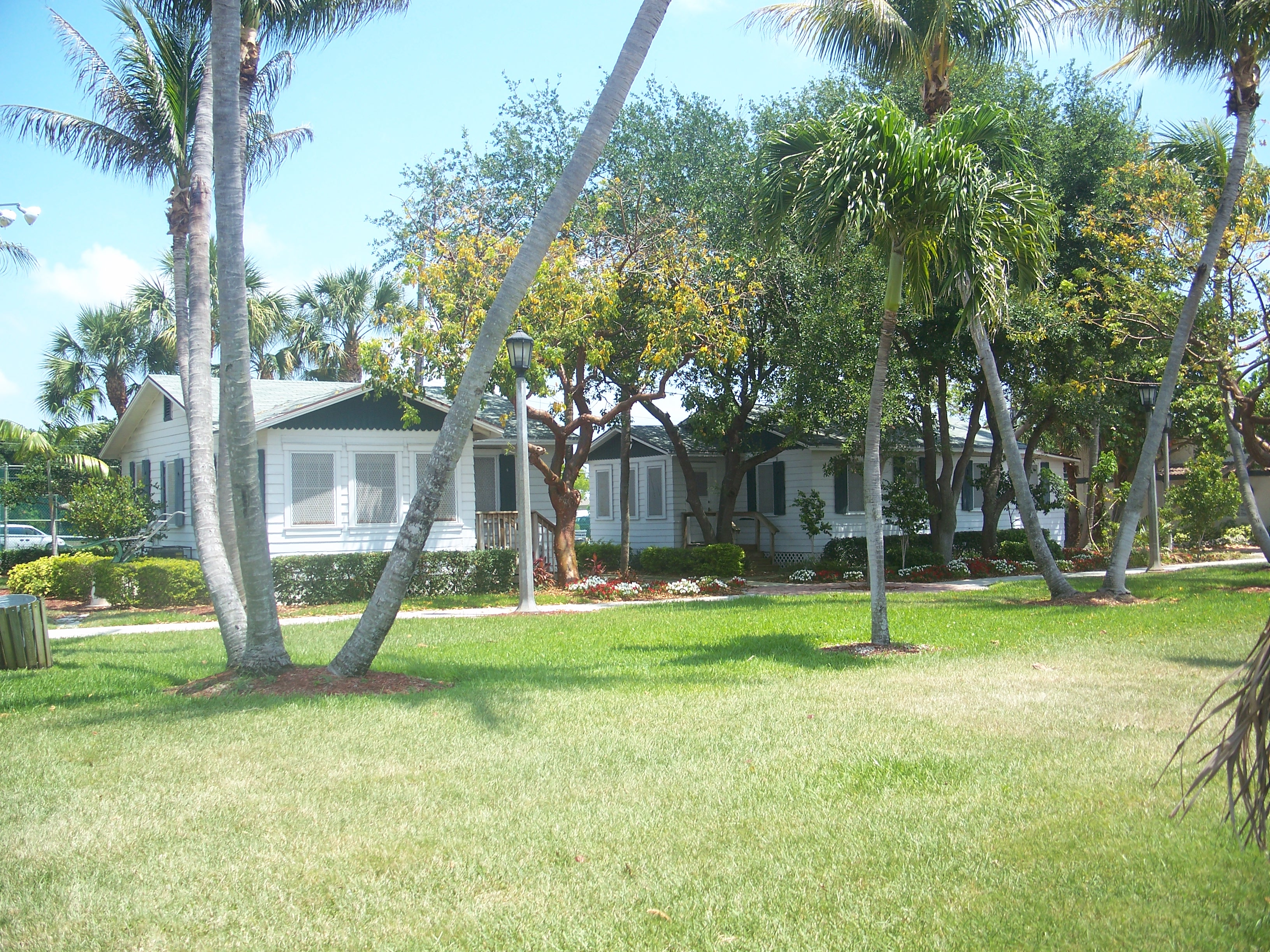
Kester Cottages

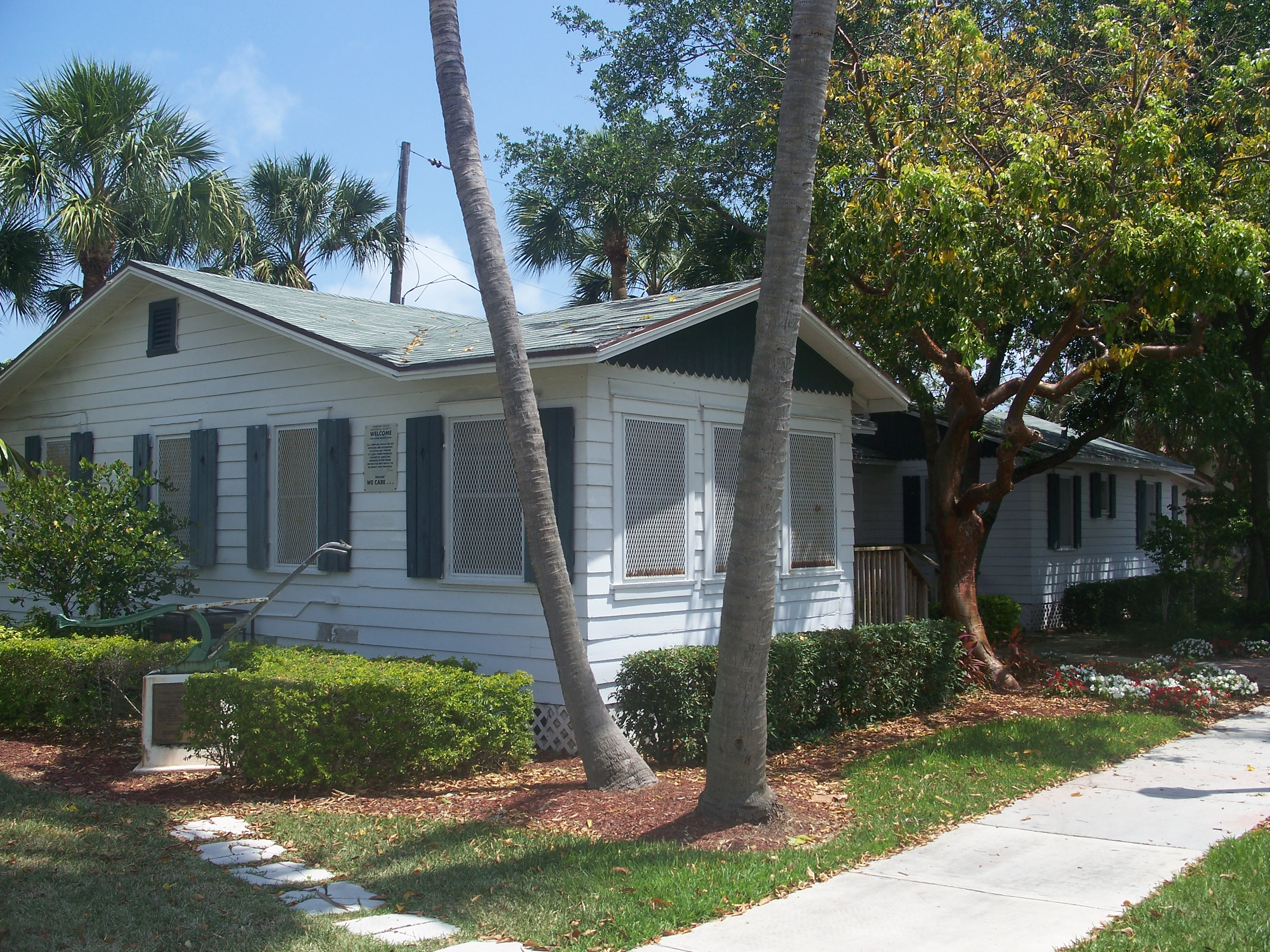
Kester Cottages

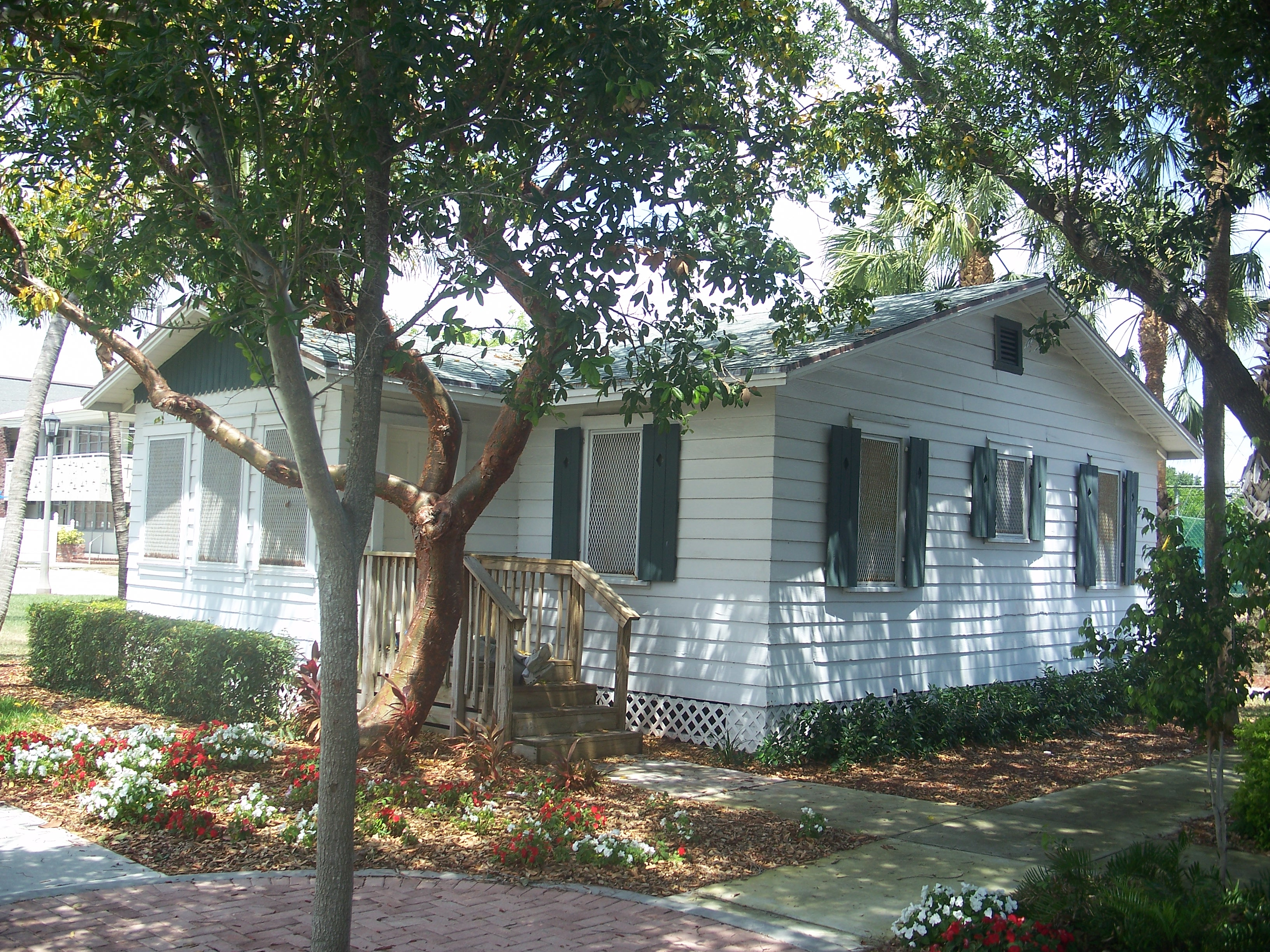
Kester Cottages

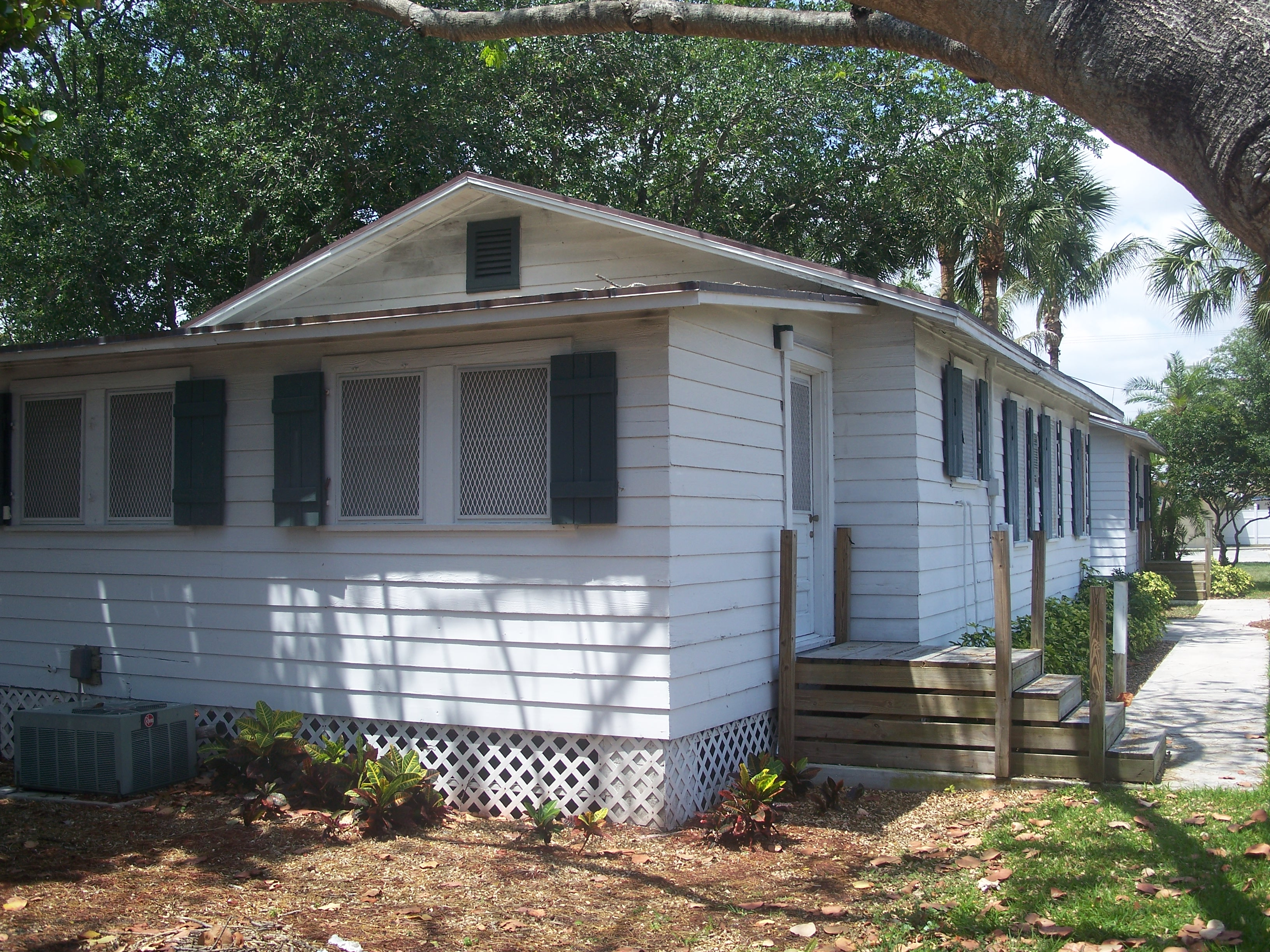
Kester Cottages

Kester Cottages at Founder's Park is a historic site operated by the Pompano Beach Historical Society in Pompano Beach, Broward County, Florida. The site includes a local history museum and exhibits from the late 1930s. They constitute the Pompano Beach Historical Museum.

The cottages are two of the perhaps 150 built in Pompano Beach by William L. Kester in the 1930s. 25 feet (7.6 m) by 35 feet (11 m), they were sturdy and economical. All were one story and painted white, with shutters decorated with the four symbols (♠♣♥♦) from a deck of cards. The price was $950.

Two cottages were donated to the Pompano Beach Historical Society in 1974 by Stewart Kester, William L. Kester's nephew. They were initially moved to what was then known as Rustic Park, along the Pompano Canal, where they were restored and opened to the public, before later being relocated to Founders Park, where they now serve as museums of past life in Pompano Beach.

Over the years, many of the other Kester Cottages built throughout Pompano Beach, including several along Atlantic Boulevard, were demolished or relocated. Some were moved inland and converted into private residences, while others were placed on barges and transported to locations including the Florida Keys, the Lake Okeechobee region, and the Bahamas. Several cottages survive in the 700 block of NE First Street in Pompano Beach, where they have been painted in bright colors but retain their original architectural details.

They are open to the public by appointment.

== Website ==
- Pompano Historical Society website
