= Louis Holmes (American football) =

American football player (1985–2023)

No. 62, 71
- Position: Defensive end

Personal information
- Born: February 24, 1985; Memphis, Tennessee, U.S.
- Died: June 13, 2023 (aged 38)
- Listed height: 6 ft 4 in (1.93 m)
- Listed weight: 275 lb (125 kg)

Career information
- High school: Fort Lauderdale (FL) Dillard
- College: Arizona
- NFL draft: 2008: undrafted

Career history
- San Francisco 49ers (2008)*; Tampa Bay Buccaneers (2009)*; California Redwoods (2009); Spokane Shock (2012); Los Angeles KISS (2015)
- * Offseason or practice squad member only

Awards and highlights
- Second-team All-Pac-10 (2006); NJCAA All-American (2005)

Career AFL statistics
- Total tackles: 11
- Pass deflections: 2
- Receptions: 1
- Receiving yards: 12
- Stats at ArenaFan.com

Louis Holmes (February 24, 1985 – June 13, 2023) was an American football defensive end. He was signed by the San Francisco 49ers as an undrafted free agent in 2008. He played college football at Arizona.

== Early life ==
He spent final prep season at Dillard High School (Fort Lauderdale, FL) after attending his first three years of high school in his hometown of Memphis.

== College career ==
Holmes totaled 265 tackles, 22.0 sacks and 50.5 tackles for loss in four collegiate seasons, spending first two years at Scottsdale Community College before transferring to the University of Arizona for his final two campaigns. He played in 12 games with 10 starts for Arizona as a senior in 2007, tallying 37 tackles, two sacks and 5.5 tackles for loss. He was named Second-team All-Pac-10 during first season at Arizona as a junior, recording 36 tackles, four sacks, five tackles for loss, two forced fumbles and one fumble recovery. He combined for 192 tackles, 16.0 sacks and 40 tackles for loss in two seasons at Scottsdale Community College, garnering NJCAA All-American, All-Regional and All-Western States Football League honors.

== Professional career ==
=== San Francisco 49ers ===
Holmes was signed by the San Francisco 49ers as a rookie free agent on May 1, 2008.

=== Los Angeles KISS ===
On January 23, 2015, Holmes was assigned to the Los Angeles KISS.
