= Jeffrey Baron (government minister) =

Bermudian politician

Minister of National Security
- In office May 2016 – July 2017
- Succeeded by: Wayne Caines

Personal details
- Party: One Bermuda Alliance
- Education: University of Leicester (MSc); Harvard Kennedy School (MPA)

Jeffrey Baron is a former Bermudian government minister. He served as the Minister of National Security from 2016 to 2017. Previously he was a member of the Senate of Bermuda from 2012 to 2016.
