= Associated Grocers of Florida =

American retailers' cooperative

Associated Grocers of Florida, Inc.
- Type: Privately held Cooperative
- Founded: 1945
- Headquarters: Pompano Beach, FL, U.S.
- Area served: United States, South America, Central America, Caribbean
- Key people: Christopher Miller, President; Gregg Young, Executive VP Sales; Jose Capellades, Executive VP Export; Loly Pinilla, Executive Assistant
- Website: www.agfla.com

Associated Grocers of Florida, Inc. is a retailers' cooperative based in Pompano Beach that distributes full lines of groceries and general merchandise. Founded in 1945, it provides retail services to independent Supermarkets.

Associated Grocers of Florida is a wholesale distributor and exporter of groceries, meat, produce, dairy, ice cream, frozen food, general merchandise, health and beauty care, and store supplies to supermarkets throughout Florida, Central America, South America, and Caribbean countries.

Store Brands include IGA, Shurfine, Shurfresh, Paws Premium Pet Care, Valutime, Top Care, Food Club, and Full Circle.

Associated Grocers of Florida was acquired by SuperValu in 2017.
