= Blanche Ely High School =

Location
- 1201 Northwest 6th Avenue; Pompano Beach, Florida 33060-5318; United States; 26°14′34″N 80°07′51″W

Information
- Type: Public
- Motto: "Home of the Mighty Tigers" "Destination Excellence"
- School district: Broward County Public Schools
- Superintendent: Dr. Peter B. Licata
- Principal: Tavarus Williams
- Staff: 80.00 (FTE)
- Grades: 9–12
- Enrollment: 1,877 (2024–2025)
- Student to teacher ratio: 23.46
- Colors: Orange and Green
- Mascot: Mighty Tiger
- Website: blancheely.browardschools.com

Blanche Ely High School is a high school located in Pompano Beach, Broward County, Florida, United States. The school is named for Blanche Ely, former principal and social activist.

In addition to Pompano Beach, Ely serves a portion of Deerfield Beach and a portion of Lauderdale-by-the-Sea.

== Magnet program ==
Blanche Ely High School offers medical and engineering magnet programs and vocational programs such as the Health Occupations Students of America (HOSA) and the LPN nursing.

The Practical Nursing Program at Blanche Ely High School is part of the Broward County Practical Nursing Program. It is the only Practical Nursing Program in a comprehensive high school in the State of Florida. Students who qualify for this program, and successfully complete it, are awarded certificates of completion at the end of their senior year. They also qualify to take the Florida State Board of Nursing licensing exam (NCLEX) to become Licensed Practical Nurses.

In addition to completing the general education requirements for graduation, students are required to take specific prerequisites prior to acceptance into the program. Courses in the discipline of nursing are taken during the junior and senior years and include classroom, laboratory and nursing practicum in a variety of health care settings. Such as clinics, nursing homes & hospitals. Emphasis is placed on preparing students capable of safe, competent practice with provisions for progressive educational growth and upward mobility in nursing. Admission into the program is both limited access and competitive.

== Extracurricular activities ==
=== Sports ===
Their mascot is the Mighty Tiger. State championships include 2002 in football. Blanche Ely Boys Basketball has a total of 9 state championships; in 1993 under Coach Wade Edmond, 2007, 2012, 2013, 2015, 2016, 2018, 2019 with Coach Melvin Randall, & 2025 under Coach J.R. McNabb, and 2003 and 2007 in track and field. Under the guidance of Coach William F. Boynton Blanche Ely High School won the Class A Florida High School Athletic Association Cross Country Championship in 1968. The Cross Country Team finished runners-up in 1969.

In 1967, Ely met McArthur in the season opener for both teams. This, along with another game in Broward County between Fort Lauderdale and Dillard the same night, was the first meeting between white and black teams.

=== JROTC ===
Blanche Ely High School has an Army Junior Reserve Officers' Training Corps (JROTC) unit.

=== Television production ===
BETV was a daily newscast that featured anchors, reporters, and special segments that are broadcast throughout the school. The newscast won awards twice. BETV aired its final episode (Episode #1330) on 7 June 2010.

=== Organizations ===
Blanche Ely High School offers a variety of student organizations and extracurricular activities. These organizations provide students with opportunities to participate in leadership, academic, cultural, and community-oriented activities outside of the classroom. Among the organizations at the school are SIGMA, The Ladies of Intrigue, Adimu: Men of Excellence, Kiada: Ladies of Distinction, Gentlemen of Influence, French Club, Bandaids, ICON, ESA, and Student Government. The school’s student organizations encompass a range of interests and activities, including leadership development, academic enrichment, cultural engagement, and student governance.

== Demographics ==
As of the 2021-22 school year, the total student enrollment was 1,993. The ethnic makeup of the school was 74.6% Black, 23.1% White, 21.5% Hispanic, 0.6% Asian, 0.1% Pacific Islander, 1.4% Multiracial, and 0.3% Native American or Native Alaskan.

== Notable alumni ==
=== Entertainment ===
Name	Class year	Notability	Reference(s)
Kodak Black	2015	musician	
Esther Rolle	1938	best known for her portrayal of Florida Evans on the sitcom Maude and its spin-off series Good Times	

=== Sports ===
Name	Class year	Notability	Reference(s)
Tyrone Carter	1994	professional football player	Steelers bio
Henri Crockett	1992	professional football player	
Zack Crockett	1990	professional football player	
Al Harris	1993	professional football player	
Dou Innocent	1991	professional football player	
Eddie Jones	1990	professional basketball player	
James Jones	1979	professional football player	
Jerome McDougle	1997	professional football player	
Walter McFadden	2005	professional football player	
Joshua Moore	2006	professional football player	
Patrick Peterson	2008	professional football player	
Jabari Price	2010	professional football player	
Laquincy Rideau	2015	professional basketball player	
Rashard Robinson	2013	professional football player	
Clint Session	2003	professional football player	
Corey Simon	1995	professional football player	
J.T. Thomas	2006	professional football player	

=== Other ===
Name	Class year	Notability	Reference(s)
Benjamin J. Cheeks	1996?	United States district judge of the Southern District of the California	

== See also ==
- Ely Educational Museum
