= McArthur High School =

Public high school in Hollywood, Florida, United States

Location
- 6501 Hollywood Blvd; Hollywood, Florida 33024; United States; 26.01059°N 80.21697°W

Information
- Type: Public
- Established: 1957
- School district: Broward County Public Schools
- Superintendent: Howard Hepburn
- Principal: Mark Howard
- Staff: 78.53 (FTE)
- Grades: 9–12
- Enrollment: 2,050 (2022–2023)
- Student to teacher ratio: 26.10
- Campus type: Suburb
- Colors: Green, White, and Orange
- Website: mcarthur.browardschools.com

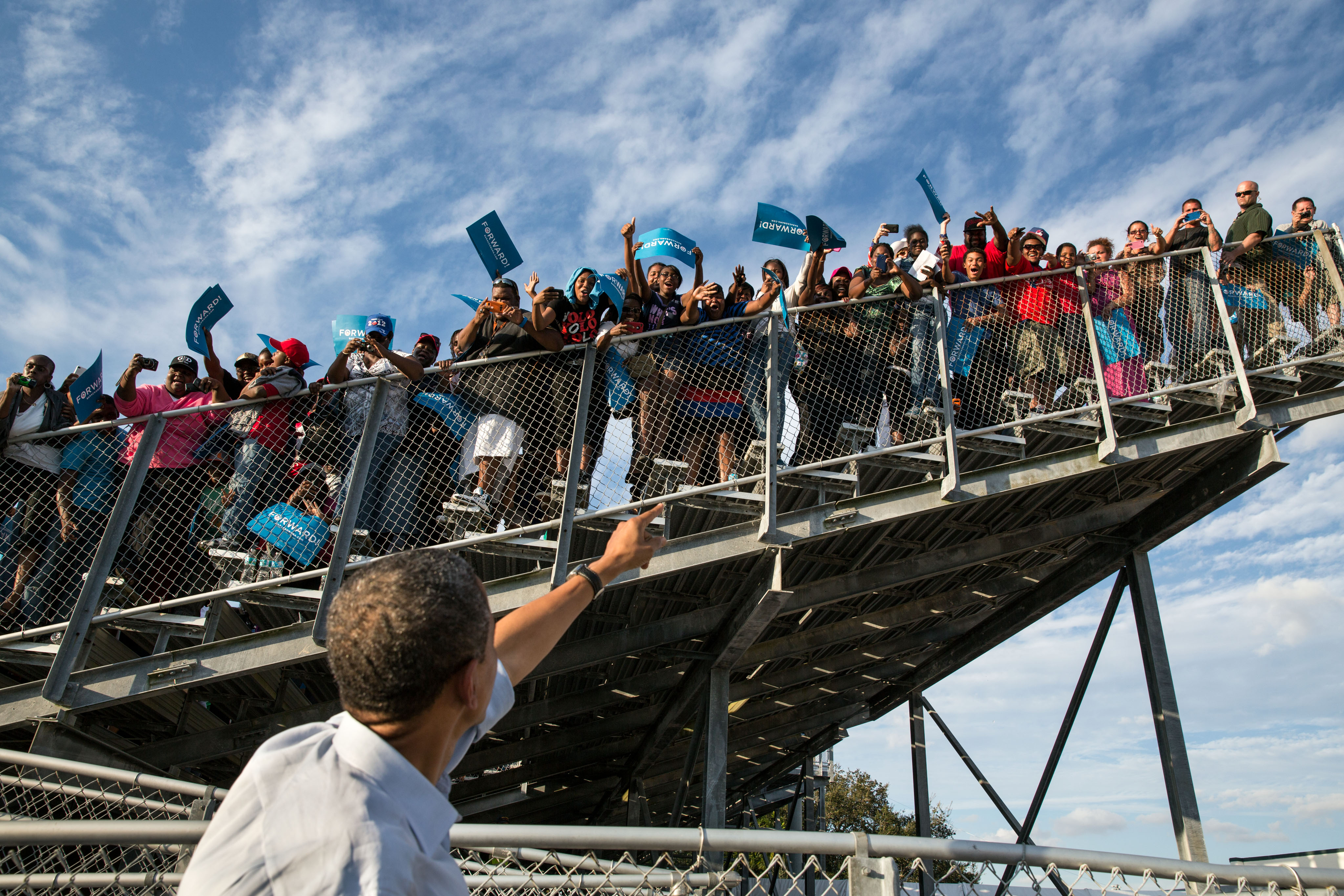
Barack Obama at McArthur High School, 2012

McArthur High School is located in Hollywood, Florida, United States. It serves students from both Hollywood and Pembroke Pines in grades 9 through 12. The school is a part of the Broward County Public Schools district.

== History ==
The late Alfred Ryll —mayor of Hollywood in 1954 and 1955—was McArthur's first principal, serving in that capacity into the 1960s. Mr. Todd J. Lapace was named the principal in 2010 until August 2019. Alfred Broomfield II then became the principal of McArthur High School. In June 2024, Mark Howard took over as McArthur's new principal.

The school was founded in 1957 at its current location (on land donated by educator and dairy magnate, J.N. McArthur). That first year saw classes in grades 7–9. Many classes in the early years were held in portable classrooms, although construction of the gymnasium, auditorium, cafeteria, library, and administrative offices was soon begun. The existing student body, as well as the new seventh grades class entering in 1958, were served by those new facilities, although there were still several portable structures on campus.

Planning was already in progress for feeder schools (then called junior high schools, now known as middle schools), and in the fall of 1959, the eventual class of '64 left McArthur and attended Driftwood (students living north of Hollywood Boulevard) and Henry D. Perry (students living south of Hollywood Boulevard) Junior High Schools. In both cases, the eighth grade was in portable classrooms, and the ninth grade was in new physical plants. Succeeding classes went directly to Driftwood and Perry JHS.

1960 saw the first senior class graduating from McArthur, and 1959–1960 saw the last ninth grade class attending until the reorganization of the school structure. (need date) In the fall of 1961, the last seventh grade class to attend McArthur (and the classes following) returned to complete their sophomore, junior, and senior years.

In 1967, McArthur played Ely in the season opener for both teams. This, along with another game in Broward County between Fort Lauderdale and Dillard the same night, was the first meeting between white and black teams.

McArthur High has an FCAT school grade of "A" for the 2011–2012 academic year.

The boys’ cross country team won the state championship in 1964. The wrestling team won the 4A Florida High School State Championship in 1979 and the 3A State Championships in 1986, '88, and '89. The girls’ cross country team won the 4A Florida High School State Championship in 1977, '78, '79, and '80. The girls’ track and field team won the 4A Florida State Championship in 1978 and 1979.

In 2012 the school was the scene of a mass casualty response from state and local authorities, responding to a call of a mysterious rash. The local hazmat unit and firefighters evacuated 12 students and two teachers to a local hospital with police escorts. The Hollywood hazmat unit tested several objects from desks to door knobs but found no conclusive source of the rash. At the local hospital, 30 staff members were ready to receive the students, and decontamination showers were set up to process the students and teachers. The school board decided to open the school for students the next day, and the rash was eventually identified as a prank using itching powder.

== Demographics ==
As of the 2021–22 school year, the total student enrollment was 2,021. The ethnic makeup of the school was 51.8% White, 38.9% Black, 48.4% Hispanic, 4.3% Asian, 0.2% Pacific Islander, 3.4% Multiracial, and 1.4% Native American or Native Alaskan.

== Notable alumni ==
- Miriam Gonzalez - Playboy playmate
- Ruben Hyppolite II - NFL linebacker for the Chicago Bears
- Erasmus James - NFL football player and first round draft pick
- Kevin Knowles – NFL football cornerback for the Kansas City Chiefs
- Oddibe McDowell - Major League Baseball player; one of 276 players to hit for the cycle
- Bryant McFadden - two-time Super Bowl champion, CBS Sports NFL/CFB Analyst
- Damion McIntosh - NFL football player
- Laura Purser-Rose - professional baseball player
- Errict Rhett - NFL football player
- Wayne Smith - Canadian Football League player
