= Damion McIntosh =

Jamaican gridiron football player (born 1977)

No. 77
- Position: Offensive tackle

Personal information
- Born: March 25, 1977 (age 49); Kingston, Jamaica
- Listed height: 6 ft 4 in (1.93 m)
- Listed weight: 328 lb (149 kg)

Career information
- High school: Hollywood (FL) McArthur
- College: Kansas State
- NFL draft: 2000: 3rd round, 83rd overall pick

Career history
- San Diego Chargers (2000–2003); Miami Dolphins (2004–2006); Kansas City Chiefs (2007–2008); Seattle Seahawks (2009)

Awards and highlights
- Second-team All-Big 12 (1998)

Career NFL statistics
- Games played: 125
- Games started: 113
- Fumble recoveries: 6
- Stats at Pro Football Reference

Damion Alexis McIntosh (born March 25, 1977) is a former American football offensive tackle. He was drafted by the San Diego Chargers in the third round of the 2000 NFL draft. He played college football at Kansas State.

McIntosh also played for the Miami Dolphins, Kansas City Chiefs, and Seattle Seahawks.

== Early life ==
McIntosh played for McArthur High School in Hollywood, Florida. His senior year, the McArthur team went 9–1, winning the district championship and ending the regular season ranked in the top 5 of the Florida High School Athletic Association 5A Poll. Numerous of Damion's high school teammates went on to play in the collegiate ranks or professional ranks, including Anthony Kelly (Central Oklahoma), Brian Visalli (Concordia University- Wisc.), Dan Visalli (Holy Cross), Quentin Chandler (Cen. Conn.), Mike Jaeger (Mount Scenario), Tyrone Taylor and Jerome Taylor (University of Missouri), Jason Brown (Gettysburg), Wayne Smith (App State, CFL), among others.

== College career ==
He attended Kansas State playing college football for head coach Bill Snyder from 1996 to 1999. He played and started on both offensive and defensive line, earning second team all Big 12 in 1998. He was recruited by Nick Saban at Michigan State and Bobby Bowden at Florida State.

== Professional career ==
=== San Diego Chargers ===
He was drafted in the third round of the 2000 NFL draft by the San Diego Chargers. He played four season with the Chargers.

=== Miami Dolphins ===
On March 12, 2004, the Miami Dolphins signed McIntosh to a six-year, $69 million contract.

=== Kansas City Chiefs ===
McIntosh played for the Kansas City Chiefs from 2007 to 2008. He was cut by the Chiefs in September 2009.

=== Seattle Seahawks ===
McIntosh was signed by the Seattle Seahawks on October 13, 2009.
