= Benjamin J. Cheeks =

American judge (born 1977)

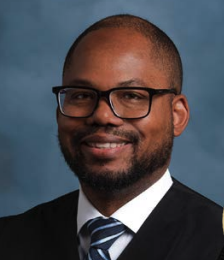

Judge of the United States District Court for the Southern District of California
- Incumbent
- Assumed office January 9, 2025
- Appointed by: Joe Biden
- Preceded by: Gonzalo P. Curiel

Magistrate Judge of the United States District Court for the Southern District of California
- In office July 19, 2024 – January 9, 2025
- Preceded by: Bernard Skomal
- Succeeded by: Brian J. White

Personal details
- Born: 1977 (age 48–49) Albany, Georgia, U.S.
- Education: University of Miami (BA); American University (JD)

Benjamin Jerome Cheeks (born 1977) is an American lawyer who has served as a United States district judge of the United States District Court for the Southern District of California since 2025. He previously served as a United States magistrate judge of the same court from 2024 to 2025.

== Early life and education ==
Cheeks is the son of Rosetta Cheeks and the late Jerome Leon Cheeks. He is a graduate of the Blanche Ely High School. He received a Bachelor of Arts from the Miami University in 2000 and a Juris Doctor from American University Washington College of Law in 2003.

== Career ==
From 2003 to 2010, Cheeks served as an assistant district attorney in the Manhattan District Attorney's Office. From 2010 to 2013, he served as an assistant United States attorney in the U.S. Attorney's Office for the Southern District of California. From 2013 to 2024, he was a criminal defense lawyer in private practice at the Law Offices of Benjamin J. Cheeks, A.P.C. in San Diego.

=== Federal judicial service ===
On March 28, 2024, he was selected as a United States magistrate judge. On July 19, 2024, he was sworn in as a United States magistrate judge of the Southern District of California. He filled the vacancy left by the retirement of Judge Bernard Skomal.

==== District court service ====
On October 23, 2024, President Joe Biden announced his intent to nominate Cheeks to serve as a United States district judge of the United States District Court for the Southern District of California. On November 18, 2024, his nomination was sent to the Senate. President Biden nominated Cheeks to the seat vacated by Judge Gonzalo P. Curiel, who assumed senior status on September 7, 2023. On November 20, 2024, a hearing on his nomination was held before the Senate Judiciary Committee. On December 12, 2024, his nomination was reported out of committee by an 11–10 party-line vote. On December 20, 2024, the United States Senate invoked cloture on his nomination by a 49–47 vote. Later that day, his nomination was confirmed by a 49–47 vote. He received his judicial commission on January 9, 2025.

== Personal life ==
Cheeks is married to Dr. Brenda Perez-Cheeks, and they have two sons.

== See also ==
- List of African American jurists
- List of African American federal judges

Legal offices
Preceded by Gonzalo P. Curiel	Judge of the United States District Court for the Southern District of California; 2025–present	Incumbent
