= Kevin Knowles =

American football player (born 2003)

No. 38 – Tampa Bay Buccaneers
- Position: Cornerback
- Roster status: Active

Personal information
- Born: April 9, 2003 (age 23); Hollywood, Florida, U.S.
- Listed height: 5 ft 11 in (1.80 m)
- Listed weight: 190 lb (86 kg)

Career information
- High school: McArthur (Hollywood, Florida)
- College: Florida State (2021–2024)
- NFL draft: 2025: undrafted

Career history
- Kansas City Chiefs (2025); Tampa Bay Buccaneers (2026–present)
- Stats at Pro Football Reference

Kevin Knowles II (born April 9, 2003) is an American professional football cornerback for the Tampa Bay Buccaneers of the National Football League (NFL). He played college football for the Florida State Seminoles.

== Early life ==
Knowles was born in 2003 in Hollywood, Florida. He played high school football as a wide receiver and safety for the McArthur Mustangs. His sophomore performance during which he recorded 39 tackles, two interceptions and three pass breakups, helped the Mustangs win a district championship. During his junior season, Knowles recorded 25 tackles and caught five interceptions, earning him First-Team All-County and Second-Team All-Broward honors. He was rated a three-star recruiting prospect by 247Sports.com. He received a total of 30 athletic scholarship offers prior to his graduation in 2020.

== College career ==
Upon formalizing his commitment in 2020, Knowles enrolled at Florida State University. He joined the Florida State Seminoles in the 2021 season as a true freshman playing nickelback. He was promoted to starting nickelback for seven of the season's final eight games and recorded 26 tackles, 1.5 tackles for a loss and two pass breakups. At the end of the season, Knowles won Devaughn Darling Defensive Freshman of the Year, an accolade he shared with fellow true freshman cornerback Omarion Cooper. At the end of his senior year in 2024, Knowles played 50 games and recorded one interception, one sack, and 113 combined tackles.

== Professional career ==
Pre-draft measurables
Height	Weight	Arm length	Hand span	Wingspan	40-yard dash	10-yard split	20-yard split	20-yard shuttle	Three-cone drill	Vertical jump	Broad jump	Bench press
5 ft 9 7/8 in (1.77 m)	189 lb (86 kg)	31 3/4 in (0.81 m)	9 in (0.23 m)	6 ft 5 in (1.96 m)	4.48 s	1.54 s	2.59 s	4.27 s	7.05 s	41.0 in (1.04 m)	10 ft 6 in (3.20 m)	12 reps
All values from Pro Day

=== Kansas City Chiefs ===
On April 27, 2025, Knowles signed with the Kansas City Chiefs as an undrafted free agent following the 2025 NFL draft. He was relegated to the practice roster once the active roster was finalized. He was elevated from the practice squad twice to play special teams and was signed to the active roster on October 21. He primarily played on special teams, including downing two punts inside the five yard line against the Dallas Cowboys, and began to play increasingly on defense in the last five games of the season.

On August 31, 2026, Knowles was waived by the Chiefs.

=== Tampa Bay Buccaneers ===
On September 1, 2026, Knowles was claimed off of waivers by the Tampa Bay Buccaneers.
