= Jellyfish Museum =

Museum in Florida, United States

Coordinates: 26.2352°N 80.0909°W

The Jellyfish Museum exhibits tanks of jellyfish in Pompano Beach, Florida. It opened in the spring of 2026. It is housed in a 10,000 square foot (930 m^{2}) former bank building. The museum was created by Alex and Yana Yanovsky, who previously established a jellyfish museum in Kyiv, Ukraine. They left Ukraine in 2022 after Russia invaded. The museum contains 21 tanks and 20 species of jellyfish.

Some of the species at the museum include Japanese sea nettles, moon jellyfish, spotted jellies, and upside-down jellyfish from Florida's mangrove swamps.
