= Merritt Boat & Engine Works =

Yacht builder and boat yard in Pompano Beach, Florida

Merritt Boat & Engine Works, sometimes abbreviated as Merritt's, is a yacht builder and boat yard headquartered in Pompano Beach, Florida. Together with Rybovich, Merritt is respected as one of the most historically significant Florida custom sport fishing boat builders.

== Birth of the Sportfish ==
In the 1930s and the 1940s, blue marlin and bluefin tuna were abundant in the waters of Cuba, Bimini and Cat Cay just a few miles off the Florida coast, targeted by fishermen such as Ernest Hemingway, and Habana Joe aboard his 1938 40-foot Wheeler named Pilar. Word spread quickly among fishermen around the world about the exciting new sport of big game fishing. Despite the growing popularity of the sport, however, the boats of the day were hardly ideal for the challenges of fighting the prized fish. Most boats utilized in those days were converted cabin cruisers and all were relatively slow and hard to maneuver.

Merritt gained particular notoriety during the 1950s through the 1970s with its 37- and 43-foot (13 m) custom sport fishing boats, which, together with boats like those being built at the same time by Rybovich, gave birth to a new category of fishing yachts and helped fuel the growth of big game sportfishing in the United States and around the world.

There is a global community of classic sport fishing boats that restore, maintain and use them for fishing.

== History ==
After leaving their Long Island home in 1947, Franklin and Ennis Merritt purchased a 10-acre (40,000 m^{2}) tract of land on the Intracoastal Waterway in Pompano Beach, Florida. In 1948 Merritt Boat and Engine Works was born. The boatyard was set up primarily to maintain the Merritt's charter boats, in addition to other charter and drift boats in the area. The yard began building boats in 1955. The Merritt's sons, Buddy and Allen became involved, with Buddy running the boat building division and Allen overseeing and administering the business.

Soon after Buddy’s passing in 1971, a third generation Merritt took over the managing of the boatyard. Roy, the son of Allen and Millie Merritt had worked in the yard since his early teens. Today Roy Merritt continues at the helm of Merritt’s Boat & Engine Works, while many other family members also work at the business, continuing the legacy started by Franklin and Ennis Merritt.

=== The 37 Footers ===
An avid fisherman, Buddy Merritt built what he perceived to be the perfect fishing boat. The first of his 37-footers were totally lacking the luxuries taken for granted today. They were built for one purpose: to raise and catch fish. In all, 13 of these famed 37-footers were built, and 12 survive to this day (one was lost to fire caused by stray fireworks while the boat was out of the water in a boat yard).

The Merritt 37 and the Rybovich 36 pioneered a style that gained popularity in the 1950s and 1960s with an open deckhouse (no bulkhead aft) and a flying bridge. Ryco Marine hull #6 imitated this style in 1991 with its launch of a 38-foot (12 m) dayboat, Wildcat.

Hull construction was typically strip planked with 1"x2" Yellow Cedar fastened to Mahogany frames and stringers.

==== Merritts built from 1955-1967 ====
- Caliban (USCG #276422, Hull #3) was built in 1955. Her last known name was Merittime, owned by Merrittime Charters, Inc. Over the years other known names include Striper, Meltemi, Sweat, Chips, Hooked II, Papa, Billy B, and Big Bad John.
- Val Jean (USCG #278638, Hull #4) was built in 1957 for Richard Horvath. It is run as a charter boat named the Do Stay by Capt. Elbert "Elly" Brown in Jupiter, Florida. The second owner of the boat was a Chevy dealer named Dick Raffo who named the boat Chevy Won. Prior to Brown's ownership as the fourth owner, she was known as Patricia and owned by Jim Cullen. When Elly Brown and wife Viola bought the boat, they renamed her after their two children: "Do" for Douglas and "Stay" for Stacy. Today, the Do Stay fishes out of the Seasport Marina on the Jupiter Inlet. In 1984, Capt. Brown signed up a young New Yorker, Jeff Bicel, as a first mate. He remains aboard the Do Stay today.
- Windsong (USCG #280634, Hull #5) was built in 1959 for Tore Hembe. In later years she was known as Barbara Jo, Caracal, Comparss Rose, Cheetah, Mistress, Thunder, Sportin' Life, Sassy Lady, Old Lady. In November, 2005 she was sold and moved from San Juan, Puerto Rico to Stuart, Florida to undergo a complete restoration by Gamefisherman & named "Friendship" in Virginia Beach.in 2009 She is renamed "Leilani" and was located in Western Samoa, in 2016 she was renamed BENCHMARK and moved to Kona, Hawaii.
- Joan E. (USCG #283725, Hull #6) was built in 1960 for Ralph Rau. It was later known as Wildcatter and Infinity before Annali.
- Timid Tuna (USCG #284725, Hull #7) was built in 1962 for Dale Schaefer. Subsequently she was known as Drummond, Dorothy D., Lady B., Easy Rider, Miltwon, Amanda, Lady Jane, Edith Ann and GAF VII. Her most recent owner was Anthony Pope, a noted member of the Italian-American community whose family gained notoriety through its ownership of American Media, publishers of the National Enquirer. While owned by Pope, GAF VII underwent a massive series of upgrades, beyond anything ever done to a boat of this small size, at a cost of more than one million dollars, including installation of huge 500 hp Cummings diesel engines. Bought by Aviation Insurance mogul Lance Paige Toland in 2012, updated and refreshed in Ft Lauderdale, renamed Ansley Ruth after Toland's daughter and is now docked on Sea Island, Georgia at the World-famous Cloister Hotel.
- Tuna Teaser (USCG #286170, Hull #8) was built in 1961 for Art Appleton. She was later known as Born Free, Sachem, Seaquirt, and most recently Release. The boat is now in Guatemala.
- Caliban (USCG #287912 Hull #9) was built in 1962 for Bill Carpenter. In the 1980s she was bought by Stewart Campbell who named it "Chunda". The boat is now in Venezuela, named Sangria I and has a pink hull
- Finest Kind (USCG #290114, Hull #10) was built in 1963 for Dorothea Dean. She was later named Nefertiti, Ballyhoo, My Way, Jingo, High Roller, Princess Claudia, Live Wire, Cookie Monster, Jolly Roger and Bulldog.
- Sunny Bunch (USCG #293145, Hull #11) was built in 1963 for a Mr. Irwin. Subsequently she was named Ole, Sea Hub, Recipe, Maverick and most recently, Northern Lights. She operates as a charter boat in Kona, Hawaii captained by Kona native Kevin Nakamaru, who is the only captain to have caught both a 1,000 pound ("grander") Black Marlin and a grander Blue Marin in both the Atlantic and the Pacific.
- Alligator (USCG #294956, Hull #12) was built in 1964 for Jack Rounick. Jack founded Korvettes department store chain and owned the South Hampton NY "House of 7 chimneys" on the ocean. Today she is based in Maui, Hawaii as a charter boat named Finest Kind. Finest Kind is a 3rd generation charter company and has been owner operated for over 32 years. Finest Kind boasts a record of having caught the most Marlin on Maui since 1972. Jimmy Donovan was the boats first captain, Robert S Langdon (Fishn Bob as he was known to Montauk fisherman by his licence plates and big heart) was the First Mate. The Alligator was shipped cargo and fished Australia's great barrier reef. Based in Montauk NY she docked at the "Deep Sea Club". Her original engines had turbo chargers added in the late 60's making the Alligator Montauk's fastest sportfishing boat.
- Windsong (USCG #503211, Hull #14) was built in 1965 for Tore Hembe, and was later known as No Problem and Hoolili.
- Sandra D. (USCG #507428, Hull #15) was built in 1967 for Sam Evert. Later she was named Echoes in the 1980s. She was subsequently owned by Roy & Allen Merritt and named Caliban, Cadence, CBM and then Rowdy hailing from Bristol, Rhode Island until April 2014 when she was purchased by Bob & Kristin Mondo renamed Andiamo! and moved to Jensen Beach, FL. She was repowered in 2016 with Cummins QSB 380 hp engines.
- Decoy (Hull #16) was built in 1967 for Richard Freydberg. She was subsequently named Jane Ann, Sea Angler, Renegade, Wild Orange and Lady. She is located in Kailua-Kona, Hawaii and is owned by Gary Nordloh. Gary Nordloh purchased the “Lady” in March 2010 and put her in dry dock to rebuild and refurbish the vessel which had been neglected for many years after the previous owner Bill Hoey died in 2004. Bill Hoey owned and meticulously maintained Lady for over 15 years. During the first six months of Gary Nordloh's ownership, Lady was refurbished to pristine condition. Her decks, fuel tanks, and headliner were rebuilt and the teak and trim was upgraded throughout with the assistance of master craftsmen Larry Greggs.

=== The 43 Footers ===
The 43 marked the transition from framed to cold molded construction. The inspiration for the 43 was the 42-foot (13 m) Hopalong, built for Fletch Creamer and Capt. Buddy Lander in 1965. At Hull No. 13, it was the longest boat Buddy Merritt had built at the time. The boat went on to become the Black Bart, owned by Bart Miller in Kona, Hawaii. This was the boat that caught the famous 1,656-pound Pacific blue marlin, the boat that won the 1975 Hawaiian International Allison-Yellowfin Tuna Tournament with a 2,000-point lead, and the boat that became the first to land more than 100 blue marlin in a season off Kona. Today Bart Miller's "Black Bart" fishing lures are one of the leading brands on the market.

The switch to cold molded construction was noted by production builders, such as Buddy Davis of Carolina Boat fame who said, "The plyboard cold mold [in my Carolina Boats] was very much a Merritt influence. I was always impressed with both Merritt and Rybovich. If anyone tells you that we aren't influenced by Merritt and Rybovich, you're not getting the whole story."

==== Merritts built from 1968-1982 ====
- Caliban (USCG #514085, Hull #17) was built in 1968 for Allen Merritt. The boat was notable because it helped Allen Merritt win seven out of 11 Cat Cay Tuna Tournaments - more than any captain in history. Cat Cay was where the tuna tower was invented and first used during the 1952 Cat Cay Tuna Tournament. The tournaments are no longer held. Caliban was later sold to Ralph Gilster, Jr. who named her Xiphias. This was the boat on which mate Larry Martin caught the 1,282-pound all-tackle Atlantic Blue Marlin record in 1977. Currently she is named Cat's Meow.
- Caliban II (USCG #520624, Hull #18) was built for Capt. Buddy Merritt in 1969. Originally a single engine vessel, she was later converted to a twin screw. The boat was subsequently owned by Charlie Cipolla who named it the CMC. John E. Richardson and family purchased the boat in June 2001. She is now named the Picaflor and fishes the Pacific Coast of Panama from her berth in Balboa.
- Caliban III (USCG #538469, Hull #19) was built for Roy's grandfather, F.R. Merritt Sr., in 1971.
- Jane S. (USCG #547715, Hull #20) was built for George Scheigert in 1974. He was the first non-family member to commission a 43-footer.
- Sansouri (USCG #558462, Hull #21) was built for Chris Weld in 1974. Once called the Buddy Boy, Today the boat is called the Nany, and spends it time fishing the waters off the Pacific Coast of Gauatemala.
- Fighting Lady (USCG #555908, Hull #22) was Merritt's last frame boat, built in 1974 for Dinny Phipps. The Fighting Lady was the inspiration for the now popular color "fighting lady yellow" and was later owned by Joe Lopez. Lopez renamed the boat the Prowess and towed it around the world behind a mothership throughout the 1980s and 1990s. The boat now renamed Fighting Lady is owned and operated by Bart Sherwood, who runs frequently out of Miami, Florida. Despite its namesake color, the boat has been repainted seafoam green. In early 2000 The Fighting Lady was acquired by The Flying Fighting Lady Charters & Outfitters, LLC, Owned by The Verner Family, of the well renowned Acousti Eng. Co of Florida, a 75 year old Family Tradition construction firm.
- No Problem (Hull #23) was built for Jo Jo Del Guercio took delivery in 1975. A cold-molded hull, the boat included a lengthened deckhouse and raised sheer that improved exterior lines, interior layout and overall balance. The boat also had the first "rocket launcher," (a device to hold fishing rods for trolling) an idea of Del Guercio's carried out by Merritt. Under the later name Cafi, the boat set a record for capturing the most white marlin in a day, a feat accomplished in 1983 off La Guaira Bank, Venezuela. The boat also caught the first 1,000-pound blue marlin off Venezuela with Capt. Ron Hamlin. The boat is now named the "Big Wednesday".
- Cinco W (USCG #571432, Hull #24) was completed in 1976 for owner Pat Welder of Texas.
- Snee Kee Peet (USCG #572858, Hull #25) was completed in 1976 for owner Pete Benoit. The Boat is now SeaJeannie and owned by Vito Costanza hailing from Montauk NY
- Belama (USCG #580128, Hull #26) was completed in 1977 for owner Newt Belcher. Today the boat is called "Mistress" and shares her time between South Florida and Cape Cod.
- Fighting Lady (USCG #604991, Hull #27) was Dinny Phipp's second 43, completed in 1978.
- Cookie Too (USCG #646216) was the last 43 ever built, and one of the most famous. It was owned by the Murray Brothers, who are well known as makers of fine fighting chairs and other marine furniture. The Murray family later sold this boat to Johnny Morris, owner of Bass Pro Shops, who renamed her the Tracker.

She is now owned by Scott Rhein of Montauk NY and has been renamed Jackpot.

== Merritt's Today ==
Merritt's still produces new custom yachts today, although they are much larger than those built decades ago, over 80 feet (24 m) in length and with many amenities and construction methods unheard of in the 1960s. The rate of custom hand-crafted production is still very slow, at only one or two yachts built each year.
