= Collier Manor-Cresthaven, Florida =

- neighborhood
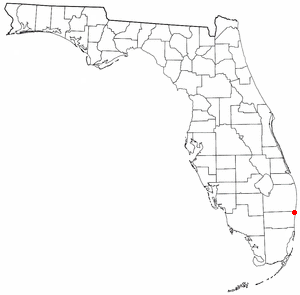
- Location of Bolivia, Florida
- Coordinates: 26°15′59″N 80°6′28″W
- Country: United States
- State: Florida
- County: Broward

Area
  - Total: 1.2 sq mi (3.0 km^{2})
  - Land: 1.2 sq mi (3.0 km^{2})
  - Water: 0 sq mi (0.0 km^{2})

Population (2000)
  - Total: 7,741
  - Density: 6,682/sq mi (2,580.1/km^{2})
- Time zone: UTC-5 (Eastern (EST))
  - Summer (DST): UTC-4 (EDT)
- FIPS code: 12-13625

Collier Manor-Cresthaven was a census-designated place (CDP) that now serves as a neighborhood of Pompano Beach, Florida, United States. The population was 7,741 at the 2000 census. During the recent rapid appreciation of home values in South Florida, many homes the Cresthaven neighborhood have come to be better maintained than they once were.

The neighborhood was developed by George J. Collier Inc.

== Geography ==
Collier Manor-Cresthaven is located at 26°15′59″N 80°6′28″W (26.266308, -80.107815).

According to the United States Census Bureau, the CDP has a total area of 3.0 km^{2} (1.2 sq mi), all land.

== Demographics ==
As of the census of 2000, there were 7,741 people, 3,056 households, and 1,851 families residing in the CDP. The population density was 2,576.6 people /km^{2} (6,673 people/mi^{2}). There were 3,303 housing units at an average density of 1,099.4 units /km^{2} (2,847 units/mi^{2}). The racial makeup of the CDP was 77.82% White (67.4% were Non-Hispanic White,) 11.78% African American, 0.47% Native American, 1.10% Asian, 0.03% Pacific Islander, 4.84% from other races, and 3.97% from two or more races. Hispanic or Latino of any race were 16.28% of the population.

There were 3,056 households, out of which 30.5% had children under the age of 18 living with them, 42.2% were married couples living together, 11.7% had a female householder with no husband present, and 39.4% were non-families. 29.2% of all households were made up of individuals, and 12.0% had someone living alone who was 65 years of age or older. The average household size was 2.53 and the average family size was 3.14.

In the CDP, the population was spread out, with 24.2% under the age of 18, 7.1% from 18 to 24, 36.0% from 25 to 44, 21.0% from 45 to 64, and 11.6% who were 65 years of age or older. The median age was 36 years. For every 100 females, there were 104.1 males. For every 100 females age 18 and over, there were 103.6 males.

The median income for a household in the CDP was $35,261, and the median income for a family was $38,750. Males had a median income of $30,385 versus $23,098 for females. The per capita income for the CDP was $15,289. About 8.6% of families and 11.1% of the population were below the poverty line, including 12.4% of those under age 18 and 16.6% of those age 65 or over.

As of 2000, English as a first language accounted for 72.54% of all residents, while Spanish made up 16.92%, French Creole accounted for 6.88%, French was the mother tongue of 1.40%, and both Italian and Portuguese tied at 1.12% of the population.
