= Ely Educational Museum =

Educational Museum

Coordinates: 26.24615°N 80.13053°W

The Ely Educational Museum, 1500 NW 6 Avenue, Pompano Beach, Florida is located in the Blanche & Joseph Ely House. (The address is sometimes given as 595 NW 15th St.; it is on the corner of the two streets.) The Elys were teachers and leaders in the black community. Blanche Ely High School (formerly Blanche Ely Negro High, and before that Pompano Colored School), where she was principal for many years, was named for her.

The city has owned the house since 1997. The museum opened briefly in 2000, but closed in 2007. It reopened in 2019, having received renovation funds from the city of Pompano Beach and the Historical Resources Division of the Florida Department of State. People can "look through archives and research the area's African-American communities with yearbooks, old photographs and other items that were part of the era when Ely and her husband were educators."
