= Pompano Colored School =

Over the years the Pompano Colored School, also known as the Pompano Beach Colored School, operated at several sites before it got its first school building at 718 NW Sixth Street, Pompano Beach, Florida in 1928. On September 6, 2018, this site was honored with a historic marker. During the early days of segregation, “colored schools” were hosted at privately owned sites for years before they were provided with a school building.For Pompano, some of the sites have not been recorded, but may have operated as early as 1915. The best known early site of the school for colored students was a two-room wooden building on the 400 block of Hammondville Road (today Martin Luther King Jr. Blvd). This was the site that Principal Blanche Ely was assigned to operate in 1924. This site was destroyed in the 1926 Miami hurricane. For a while the school was moved to the Psalters Temple, but that site was later damaged by another hurricane a couple of years later. Ely and the community rallied to establish the first official school building for the Black community in 1928. It was a two-story, six-classroom building, with library, assembly hall, and separate office for the principal. The Rosenwald Fund provided matching funds to those raised by the African-American community; Broward County also contributed. Principal Blanche Ely spearheaded efforts for its construction. It was originally for grades one through six, and later expanded to the 11th grade. In 1951, most of the school was moved into a new building on 14^{th} Street. The new building would become known as Ely High School. In 1954, the 6^{th} Street building was renamed Coleman Elementary School, in honor of Reverend James Emanuel Coleman, pastor of Pompano's Mount Calvary Baptist Church.

The 6th Street school closed in 1970, with school desegregation. It was demolished in 1972 and the site is now Coleman Park. There is a historical marker.
