= Dan Parrish =

American football player (born 1983)

Profile
- Position: Offensive tackle

Personal information
- Born: July 4, 1983 (age 43); Tallahassee, Florida
- Listed height: 6 ft 5 in (1.96 m)
- Listed weight: 348 lb (158 kg)

Career information
- College: FAMU
- NFL draft: 2007: undrafted

Career history
- Jacksonville Jaguars (2007)*; New York Giants (2008)*
- * Offseason or practice squad member only

Daniel Parrish (born July 4, 1983, in Tallahassee, Florida) is a former National Football League offensive lineman. He went to Florida A&M. He was signed by the Jacksonville Jaguars as an undrafted free agent. He later signed with the New York Giants.
