= Old Dillard High School =

- U.S. National Register of Historic Places
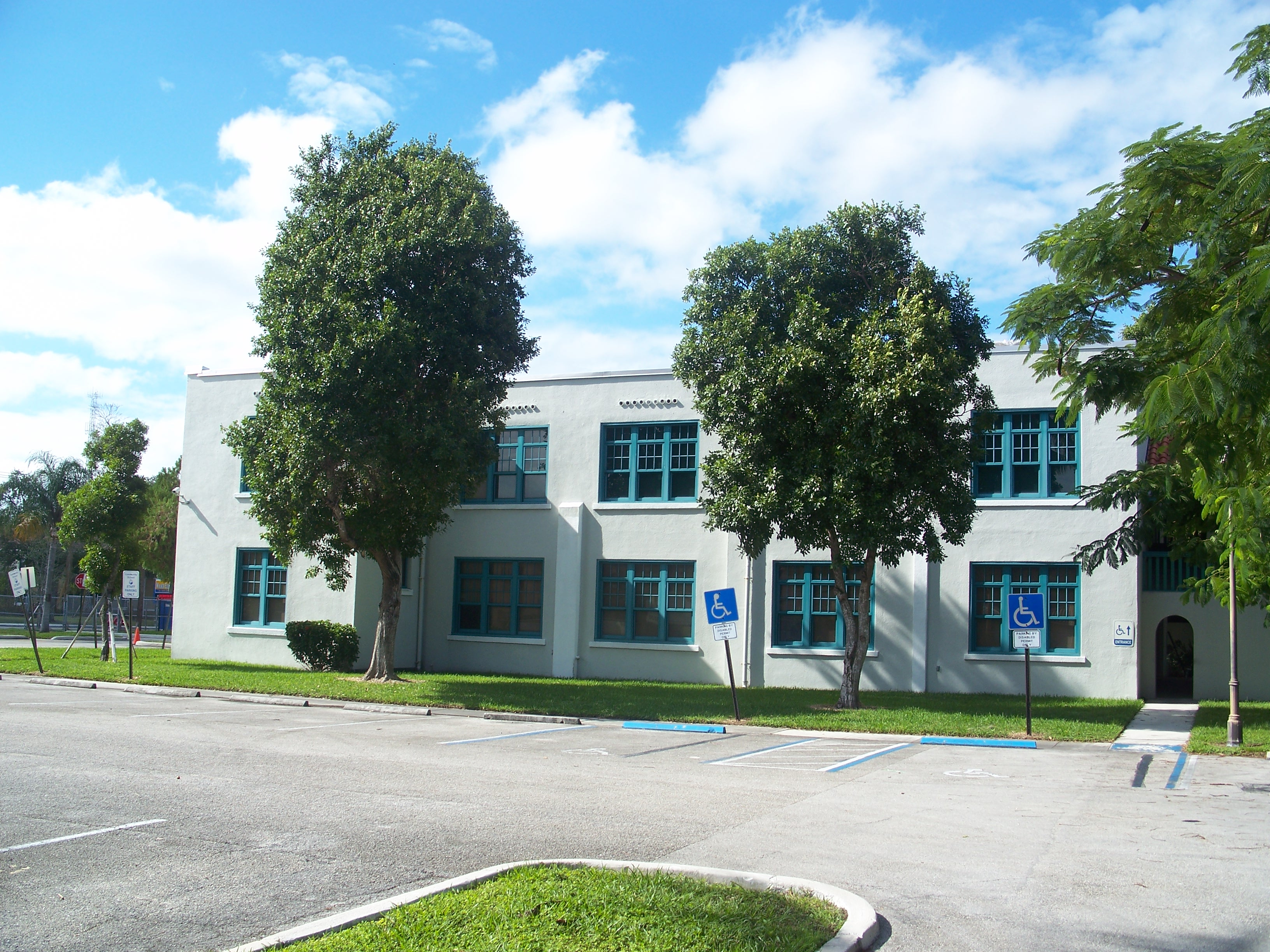

- Location within Florida Location within the United States
- Location: Fort Lauderdale, Florida
- Coordinates: 26°07′34″N 80°09′18″W
- Built by: Cayot & Hart
- Architect: John Morris Peterson
- Architectural style: Mediterranean Revival
- NRHP reference No.: 91000107
- Added to NRHP: 20 February 1991

The Old Dillard High School, also known as the Colored School or Walker Elementary, is a historic school in Fort Lauderdale, Florida. It is located at 1001 Northwest 4th Street. The first school building in Broward County for black students (earlier schools had no building), it was built in 1924 by Cayot & Hart and the architect was John Morris Peterman. On February 20, 1991, it was added to the U.S. National Register of Historic Places. It is the oldest surviving black school in Fort Lauderdale, and is named for black education advocate James H. Dillard. (A small earlier black school, without a dedicated building, opened in 1907.) Its first principal, from 1924 until 1937, was Joseph A. Ely. Clarence C. Walker, Sr. served as principal from 1937 until his death in 1942.

The high school grades were moved to a new facility in 1950, and the old building became Dillard Elementary. A new building was constructed for Dillard Elementary, and in 1954 a citizens' committee requested that the old school be named Walker Elementary. In the late 1980s the building was boarded up and slated for demolition, but was saved through community activism.

== Old Dillard Museum ==
The Old Dillard Museum is located in the high school, which was built in 1923 as the city's first school for blacks. The museum's exhibits focus on local African American history and culture.

Posters announcing the Museum's activities are found on its Twitter feed.

== Notable former employees ==
- Cannonball Adderley, jazz musician

== See also ==
- Old Lincoln High School (Tallahassee)
