= Diallo Vincent Rabain =

Bermudan government official

Diallo Vincent Rabain, JP, MP is the current Minister for the Cabinet Office and Digital Innovation, having been previously appointed on Minister of Education and Workforce Development, and a member of the Bermuda Progressive Labour Party.

== Political career ==
In November 2011 he was appointed to the Senate by Premier of Bermuda, Paula Cox, serving as Junior Minister for Education and Junior Minister for Youth, Families, and Sports. Although he was unsuccessful in the 2012 general election, he was reappointed to the Senate in December 2012 as Opposition Leader in the Senate.

On 4 February 2016, Rabain was elected to the House of Assembly representing Constituency 13, Devonshire North Central, in a by-election. He secured re-election in the general elections of 2017, 2020, and 2025. In July 2017, he was appointed Minister of Education and Workforce Development by Premier of Bermuda, Edward David Burt, a position he held for seven and a half years, making him the longest-serving Minister of Education in Bermuda's history. During his tenure, Rabain oversaw significant educational reforms, including the introduction of signature schools and the transformation of the public school system. In February 2025, following his re-election, he became Minister for the Cabinet Office and Digital Innovation, focusing on initiatives such as implementing absentee balloting, enhancing the Department of Planning, and digitizing government services.

== Community service ==
Rabain served as President of the Alpha Phi Alpha fraternity's Epsilon Theta Lambda chapter in Bermuda and was the Eastern Regional District 1 Director from 2005 to 2020 overseeing chapters in Bermuda and Germany. He also oversaw the expansion of the International Chapters in Alpha chapters in London, Liberia, and South Africa.
