= Blanche General Ely and Joseph A. Ely =

Blanche General Ely
- Born: December 7, 1904; Reddick, Florida
- Died: December 23, 1993 (aged 89)
- Burial place: Forest Lawn Memorial Gardens North, Pompano Beach, Florida
- Education: Bachelor of Arts degree, Florida A & M University; Master's Degree in Educational Administration and Supervision, Teachers College, Columbia University.
- Occupations: Teacher and principal
- Years active: 1923–1970
- Employer: Broward County School System
- Known for: Expanding educational opportunities for African-American students
- Spouse(s): ? Boyd, Joseph A. Ely
- Parents: John General (father); Sarah Enoch General (mother)

Blanche Euturpe General Ely (December 7, 1904 — December 23, 1993) was born in Reddick, Florida, the daughter of Deacon John General and Sarah Enock General. Her mother died when she was an infant, and she was raised by her father and her stepmother Amanda General. She graduated from Fessenden Academy in Ocala, and earned a Bachelor of Arts degree at Florida A & M University, and a Master's Degree in Educational Administration and Supervision, Teachers College, Columbia University. She also held a Bachelor of Science in "Life Instructions", from a program jointly sponsored by Florida A&M University and Benedict College.

In 1923, after brief spells teaching at Ojus Elementary School in Hialeah and Deerfield Beach Elementary, she was named principal of the Pompano Negro Grammar School. When its two-room wooden building was destroyed in the 1926 Miami hurricane, she spearheaded efforts to raise money, get matching support from the Rosenwald Fund, and a much larger, 6-classroom Pompano Colored School opened in 1928. The school was later renamed for her.

She was behind four new schools, and recommended principals and names for them: Pompano Migrant School (a.k.a. Golden Acres), Coleman Elementary School, Markham Elementary School, and Sanders Park Elementary School.

She retired in 1970, "when a federal desegregation order closed the [Blanche Ely] high school." She and other community leaders filed suit, and the school was reopened as an integrated school in 1974.

Blanche General Boyd, a widow, married Joseph Ely about 1937.

Her husband, Dr. Joseph Algernon Ely (†1984), was born in Jacksonville, Florida, son of Reverend Lawrence Ely, one of the founders of Florida Normal Baptist Institute in Live Oak, Florida (today Florida Memorial University), from which Joseph graduated. Joseph was also a graduate of Morehouse College and Columbia University. He is reported to have spoken "at least seven languages".

He was principal of Colored School Number 11 in Fort Lauderdale, FL. when it moved from leased privately owned sites to become Broward's first school building built for negro students (today the Old Dillard Museum). He was its first principal in the new building. The 10-room two-story building had an inscription over the front door that read "Colored School". In 1930, Ely had the school renamed in honor of James H. Dillard, a white philanthropist, educator, and promoter of education for black children. Originally it ended at grade 6, but by the time Ely left the school in 1930, a high school up to the 10th grade. He became principal at what is today Crispus Attucks Middle School, in Hollywood, FL in 1930; it was an elementary school when he arrived, but he expanded it into one of Broward County's three high schools for black students (the others were Dillard High in Ft. Lauderdale, and Blanche Ely High in Pompano Beach). He remained there until his retirement in 1963.

The Elys sponsored the first federally-funded lunch program in Broward County.

They are buried together in Forest Lawn Memorial Gardens North, Pompano Beach, Florida.

== Legacy ==
- Ely Educational Museum, Pompano Beach
- Blanche Ely High School, Pompano Beach
