= Pompano Beach, Florida =

Pompano Beach
- City
- Coastline of Pompano Beach

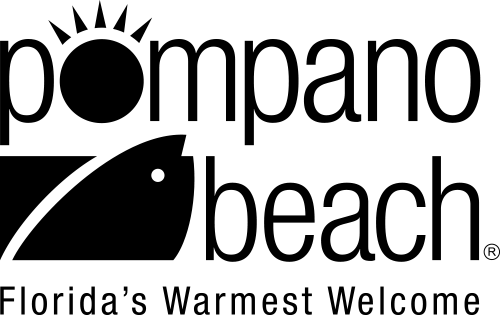
- Flag Seal Wordmark
- Motto: "Florida's Warmest Welcome"
- Location of Pompano Beach in Broward County, Florida

- Location of Pompano Beach in Florida Location of Pompano Beach in the contiguous United States
- Coordinates: 26°14′5″N 80°7′32″W
- Country: United States
- State: Florida
- County: Broward
- Settled (Pompano Settlement): c. mid-1880s–1896
- Incorporated (Town of Pompano): July 3, 1908
- Incorporated (City of Pompano Beach): June 6, 1947

Government
  - Type: Council-Manager
  - Mayor: Rex Hardin
  - Vice Mayor: Alison Fournier
  - Commissioners: Audrey Fesik, Beverly Perkins, Darlene Smith, and Rhonda Sigerson-Eaton
  - City Manager: Gregory Harrison
  - City Clerk: Kervin Alfred

Area
  - Total: 24.70 sq mi (63.96 km^{2})
  - Land: 24.02 sq mi (62.22 km^{2})
  - Water: 0.67 sq mi (1.74 km^{2}) 5.54%
- Elevation: 13 ft (4 m)

Population (2020)
  - Total: 112,046
  - Estimate (2022): 112,302
  - Rank: 270th in the United States; 20th in Florida
  - Density: 12,109.1/sq mi (4,675.35/km^{2})
- Time zone: UTC−5 (EST)
  - Summer (DST): UTC−4 (EDT)
- ZIP codes: 33060-33077, 33093, 33097
- Area codes: 754, 954
- FIPS code: 12-58050
- GNIS feature ID: 0289162
- Website: pompanobeachfl.gov

Pompano Beach (/ˈpɒmpənoʊ/ POM-pə-noh) is a city in Broward County, Florida, United States. It is located along the coast of the Atlantic Ocean, just north of Fort Lauderdale and 36 miles north of Miami. The nearby Hillsboro Inlet forms part of the Atlantic Intracoastal Waterway. It is a principal city of the Miami metropolitan area, which was home to 6.14 million people in 2020. As of the 2020 census, the population was 112,046, making it the sixth-largest city in Broward County, the ninth-largest city in the South Florida metropolitan area, and the 20th-largest city in Florida.

Pompano Beach Airpark, located within the city, is the home of the Goodyear Blimp Spirit of Innovation.

== History ==
Tequesta Indians lived in the area.

The city's name is derived from the Florida pompano (Trachinotus carolinus), a fish found off the Atlantic coast.

There had been scattered settlers in the area since at least the mid-1880s, but the first documented permanent residents of the Pompano area were George Butler and Frank Sheen and their families, who arrived in 1896 as railway employees. The first train arrived in the small Pompano settlement on February 22, 1896. It is said that Sheen gave the community its name after jotting down on his survey of the area the name of the fish he had for dinner. The coming of the railroad led to development farther west from the coast. In 1906, Pompano became the southernmost settlement in newly created Palm Beach County. That year, the Hillsboro Lighthouse was completed on the beach.

On July 3, 1908, a new municipality was incorporated in what was then Dade County: the Town of Pompano. John R. Mizell was elected the first mayor. In 1915, Broward County was established, with a northern boundary at the Hillsboro Canal. Thus, within eight years, Pompano had been in three counties. Pompano Beach experienced significant growth during the Florida land boom of the 1920s. In 1940, the U.S. Supreme Court disallowed forced confessions in Chambers v. Florida, a dispute stemming from a murder in Pompano Beach.

Following the population boom due to World War II, in 1947, the City of Pompano merged with the newly formed municipality on the beach and became the City of Pompano Beach. In 1950, the population of the city reached 5,682. Like most of southeast Florida, Pompano Beach experienced great growth in the late 20th century as many people moved there from northern parts of the United States. A substantial seasonal population also spends its winters in the area. The city of Pompano Beach celebrated its centennial in 2008. It is twinned with West Bromwich in the United Kingdom.

The majority of the initial inhabitants, both African American and white, in this region migrated from northern Florida, Georgia, and the Carolinas, while some black residents also came from the Bahamas.

== Geography ==
According to the United States Census Bureau, the city has a total area of 25.4 square miles (65.8 km^{2}), of which 24.0 square miles (62.2 km^{2}) is land and 1.4 square miles (3.6 km^{2}), or 5.54%, is water.

A 2017 study showed 73,000 residents living within FEMA's coastal floodplain.

Pompano Beach is in northeastern Broward County along the Atlantic Ocean. It includes about 3 miles (5 km) of beachfront, extending from the intersection of State Road A1A and Terra Mar Drive to the Hillsboro Inlet. The city is bounded by the following municipalities:

On its northeast:

- Hillsboro Beach
- Lighthouse Point

On its north:

- Deerfield Beach

On its west:

- Coconut Creek

On its southwest:

- Margate
- North Lauderdale

On its south:

- Fort Lauderdale

On its southeast:

- Lauderdale-by-the-Sea

=== Climate ===
Pompano Beach has a tropical monsoon climate (Am) with hot, humid summers and warm winters.

Climate data for Pompano Beach, Florida (Pompano Beach Airpark), 1991–2020 normals, extremes 1998–present
Month	Jan	Feb	Mar	Apr	May	Jun	Jul	Aug	Sep	Oct	Nov	Dec	Year
Record high °F (°C)	88 (31)	90 (32)	96 (36)	98 (37)	99 (37)	99 (37)	98 (37)	97 (36)	102 (39)	94 (34)	89 (32)	95 (35)	102 (39)
Mean maximum °F (°C)	84.3 (29.1)	85.6 (29.8)	89.3 (31.8)	91.1 (32.8)	91.9 (33.3)	93.3 (34.1)	93.8 (34.3)	93.7 (34.3)	93.3 (34.1)	90.5 (32.5)	86.3 (30.2)	85.5 (29.7)	96.3 (35.7)
Mean daily maximum °F (°C)	76.3 (24.6)	78.1 (25.6)	80.2 (26.8)	83.6 (28.7)	86.3 (30.2)	88.9 (31.6)	90.5 (32.5)	90.7 (32.6)	89.0 (31.7)	86.2 (30.1)	81.3 (27.4)	78.3 (25.7)	84.1 (28.9)
Daily mean °F (°C)	68.4 (20.2)	70.3 (21.3)	72.6 (22.6)	76.6 (24.8)	79.7 (26.5)	82.6 (28.1)	84.0 (28.9)	84.2 (29.0)	82.9 (28.3)	79.9 (26.6)	74.6 (23.7)	71.0 (21.7)	77.2 (25.1)
Mean daily minimum °F (°C)	60.4 (15.8)	62.4 (16.9)	64.9 (18.3)	69.5 (20.8)	73.2 (22.9)	76.3 (24.6)	77.5 (25.3)	77.7 (25.4)	76.8 (24.9)	73.7 (23.2)	67.8 (19.9)	63.7 (17.6)	70.3 (21.3)
Mean minimum °F (°C)	42.9 (6.1)	46.2 (7.9)	49.7 (9.8)	58.3 (14.6)	65.1 (18.4)	70.9 (21.6)	72.9 (22.7)	72.3 (22.4)	72.3 (22.4)	61.7 (16.5)	53.2 (11.8)	49.2 (9.6)	40.5 (4.7)
Record low °F (°C)	35 (2)	35 (2)	39 (4)	51 (11)	56 (13)	66 (19)	70 (21)	63 (17)	68 (20)	52 (11)	40 (4)	34 (1)	34 (1)
Average precipitation inches (mm)	1.93 (49)	2.01 (51)	2.90 (74)	3.36 (85)	5.46 (139)	8.05 (204)	5.26 (134)	6.30 (160)	7.58 (193)	6.65 (169)	3.67 (93)	2.45 (62)	55.62 (1,413)
Average precipitation days (≥ 0.01 in)	7.3	7.2	7.1	6.7	9.4	14.7	15.7	15.7	16.8	12.1	9.6	9.1	131.4
Source: NOAA (mean maxima/minima 2006–2020)

== Neighborhoods ==
These are the neighborhoods and communities that are officially recognized by the City of Pompano Beach.

- Andrews Industrial District
- Arvida-Pompano Park
- Avalon Harbor
- Avondale
- Beach
- Blanche Ely
- Boulevard Park
- Canal Point
- Civic Campus
- Collier City
- Cresthaven
- Cypress Bend
- Cypress Cove
- Cypress Lakes
- Downtown Pompano Beach
- Garden Isles
- Gardens
- Golfview Estates
- Harbor Village
- Pompano Beach Highlands
- Hillsboro Shores
- Island Club
- John Knox Village
- Kendall Green
- Leisureville
- Liberty Park
- Loch Lomond
- Lyons Park
- Northwest Pompano
- Old Collier
- Old Pompano
- Palm Aire
- Pine Tree Park
- Pompano Airpark
- Sanders Park
- Santa Barbara Estates
- Santa Barbara Shores
- Snug Harbor
- South Dixie
- Terra Mar

== Demographics ==
Historical population
Census	Pop.	Note	%±
1920	636		—
1930	2,614		311.0%
1940	4,427		69.4%
1950	5,682		28.3%
1960	15,992		181.5%
1970	38,587		141.3%
1980	52,618		36.4%
1990	72,411		37.6%
2000	78,191		8.0%
2010	99,845		27.7%
2020	112,046		12.2%
2024 (est.)	118,104	▲	5.4%
U.S. Decennial Census; 1920–1970 1980 1990; 2000 2010 2020 2022

Historical racial composition	2020	2010	2000	1990	1980
White (non-Hispanic)	41.0%	50.6%	60.8%	66.5%	80.6%
Hispanic or Latino	23.8%	17.5%	9.9%	5.4%	2.2%
Black or African American (non-Hispanic)	28.0%	28.2%	25.0%	27.4%	16.8%
Asian and Pacific Islander (non-Hispanic)	1.6%	1.3%	0.8%	0.5%	0.4%
Native American (non-Hispanic)	0.1%	0.2%	0.1%	0.1%	0.4%
Some other race (non-Hispanic)	1.3%	0.7%	0.3%	0.1%	0.4%
Two or more races (non-Hispanic)	4.1%	1.5%	3.0%	N/A	N/A
Population	112,046	99,845	78,191	72,411	52,618

Demographic characteristics	2020	2010	2000	1990	1980
Households	59,742	55,885	44,496	32,157	24,244
Persons per household	1.88	1.79	1.76	2.25	2.17
Sex Ratio	101.5	104.3	97.3	92.7	86.2
Ages 0–17	18.4%	18.3%	17.7%	17.1%	15.0%
Ages 18–64	61.2%	62.8%	58.9%	65.4%	55.2%
Ages 65 +	20.3%	18.9%	23.4%	17.5%	29.8%
Median age	43.2	42.7	42.2	41.0	50.9
Population	112,046	99,845	78,191	72,411	52,618

Economic indicators
2017–21 American Community Survey	Miramar	Broward County	Florida
Median income	$31,587	$36,222	$34,367
Median household income	$56,109	$64,522	$61,777
Poverty Rate	15.6%	12.4%	13.1%
High school diploma	84.7%	90.0%	89.0%
Bachelor's degree	29.0%	34.3%	31.5%
Advanced degree	11.0%	13.1%	11.7%

Language spoken at home (Note: Language spoken at home among residents at least five years old; only languages (or language groups) which at least 2% of residents have spoken at any time since 1980 are mentioned)	2015 (Note: Refers to 2013–2017 American Community Survey data; the last Decennial Census where language data was collected was in the 2000 census)	2010 (Note: Refers to 2008–2012 American Community Survey data; the last Decennial Census where language data was collected was in the 2000 census)	2000	1990	1980
English	64.6%	64.1%	75.7%	83.6%	91.1%
Spanish or Spanish Creole	17.4%	16.1%	9.3%	4.7%	2.1%
French or Haitian Creole	10.2%	11.8%	8.4%	6.9%	1.7%
Portuguese	N/A (Note: Not counted separately; aggregated into "Other" category)	2.8%	1.5%	0.3%	N/A
Other Languages	7.8%	5.2%	5.1%	4.5%	5.1%

Nativity	2015 (Note: Refers to 2013–2017 American Community Survey data; the last Decennial Census where foreign-born population data was collected was in the 2000 census)	2010 (Note: Refers to 2008–2012 American Community Survey data; the last Decennial Census where foreign-born population data was collected was in the 2000 census)	2000	1990	1980
% population native-born	72.8%	74.6%	79.7%	85.8%	90.0%
... born in the United States	70.3%	72.4%	78.5%	84.7%	89.5%
... born in Puerto Rico or Island Areas	1.3%	1.2%	0.6%	1.6%	0.5%
... born to American parents abroad	1.2%	1.1%	0.7%	0.6%	0.5%
% population foreign-born (Note: Only countries of birth which at least 2% of residents were born in at any time since 1980 are mentioned)	27.2%	25.4%	20.3%	14.2%	10.0%
... born in Haiti	6.1%	6.9%	4.8%	4.4%	N/A
... born in Mexico	2.6%	2.6%	2.0%	0.5%	< 0.1%
... born in Brazil	2.1%	2.4%	1.4%	0.2%	N/A
... born in other countries	16.4%	13.5%	12.1%	9.1%	10.0%

As of 2010, Italian-Americans made up 8.5% of the population, forming the second largest ancestry group in the city.

As of 2010, before annexation of other areas, Pompano Beach has the highest concentration of residents of Haitian ancestry in the country, at 9.3% of the population, while it had the highest percentage of Brazilians in the US, at 2.67%.

In 2000, the median income for a household in the city was $36,073, and the median income for a family was $44,195. Males had a median income of $31,162 versus $26,870 for females. The per capita income for the city was $23,938. About 13.1% of families and 17.0% of the population were below the poverty line, including 30.1% of those under age 18 and 9.4% of those age 65 or over.

As of 2000, before many of the unincorporated areas were annexed to the city, those who spoke only English were 76.4% of the population, while those who spoke Spanish as a mother tongue were 9.3%, while French Creole (mostly Haitian Creole) was at 6.2%, French at 2.4%, Portuguese 1.5%, German was 1.0%, and Italian as a first language made up 0.9% of the population.

Data for previously unincorporated areas that are now part of Pompano Beach:

- Pompano Beach Highlands as English being at 69.54% who spoke it as a first language, while Spanish at 20.26%, French Creole (Haitian Creole) at 4.74%, Portuguese 3.89%, and Vietnamese at 1.12% of the population.
- Collier Manor-Cresthaven had speakers of English as their first language at 72.54%, Spanish at 16.92%, French Creole (Haitian Creole) 6.88%, French at 1.40%, Italian at 1.12%, and Portuguese at 1.12% of residents.
- Leisureville: As of 2000, speakers of English as a first language accounted for 86.24% of all residents, while speakers of French Creole accounted for 10.05%, and speakers of German as a mother tongue made up 3.70% of the population.

== Education ==
Although there are about 17 post-secondary schools within 10 miles (16 km) of downtown Pompano Beach, the majority of these are for-profit schools or schools that specialize in a specific field. Students may prefer postsecondary schools that offer programs in a wider variety of disciplines, especially if a student has yet to settle on a specific field of study. Pompano Beach is also the registered office for Augustine Graduate School, a post-secondary school, named for the North African theologian, philosopher, educator, and scholar Augustine, the graduate school offers graduate programs in the areas of psychology, philosophy, theology, education, and business; additionally the graduate school offers graduate certificates in various areas.

Broward County Public Schools operates public K–12 schools.

Elementary schools

- Pompano Beach Elementary School
- C. Robert Markham Elementary
- Cresthaven Elementary
- Cypress Elementary
- Drew Charles Elementary
- McNab Elementary
- Norcrest Elementary
- Palmview Elementary
- Sanders Park Elementary

Middle schools

- Pompano Beach Middle School
- Crystal Lake Middle School

High schools

- Blanche Ely High School
- Pompano Beach High School (magnet for northern Broward County)
- Schools outside of the Pompano Beach city limits: Coconut Creek HS (Coconut Creek) Deerfield Beach HS (Deerfield Beach), and Monarch HS (Coconut Creek)

The Roman Catholic Archdiocese of Miami operates the Saint Coleman K–8 school in Pompano Beach; it opened on September 9, 1958. The archdiocese formerly operated the St. Elizabeth of Hungary School. The church attempted to resolve its debt to the archdiocese by loaning $2.13 million from Bank of America, and the school had $337,000 in debt in 2009, and it ballooned to $1.3 million of debt in the 2009–2010 school year. It closed on June 15, 2010.

== Economy ==
In recent years, an effort to rejuvenate rundown areas near the city's beach has gained momentum and has stimulated a multibillion-dollar building boom. Community redevelopment agencies were established for the East Atlantic/Beach corridor, as well as for the old downtown and Hammondville/Martin Luther King Jr. corridor.

Companies based in Pompano Beach include Associated Grocers of Florida. Nonprofits include Cross International.

=== Largest employers ===
According to the city's 2011 Comprehensive Annual Financial Report, the largest employers in the city are:

#	Employer	# of Employees
1	Pompano Park	1,100
2	City of Pompano Beach	712
3	Broward County Sheriff's Office	700
4	Walmart	687
5	Publix	655
6	Aetna Rx Home Delivery	490
7	Point Blank Solutions	400
8	Associated Grocers of Florida	300
9	Pompano Masonry	300
10	FreshPoint	284

== Arts and culture ==
=== Annual cultural events ===
Pompano Beach holds several annual cultural events including the Pompano Beach Seafood Festival, St. Patrick's Irish Festival, St. Coleman's Italian Festival, the Pompano Beach Holiday Boat Parade, The Holiday Yuletide Parade, The Annual Nautical Flea Market at Pompano Community Park & Amphitheater, and The Annual Blues and Sweet Potato Pie "Juneteenth" Festival.

=== Museums and other points of interest ===
The Kester Cottages (the Pompano Beach Historical Museum), Blanche Ely House Museum, Meridian Gallery, The Historic Ali Cultural Arts Center, Bailey Contemporary Arts, and Pompano Beach Art Gallery are located in the city. Two theatres in the area include Curtain Call Playhouse and Poet Productions. There are two malls in Pompano Beach. The first is Festival Flea Market Mall, which houses booths and kiosks selling jewelry, electronics, and clothing. The other, Pompano Citi Centre, is an open-air mall.

Pompano is also home to the Jellyfish Museum.

== Sports ==
Pompano Beach Municipal Golf Course has two 18-hole courses, the Palms, and the Pines, which opened in 2013.

== Parks and recreation ==
Parks include Pompano Beach Community Park, Kester Park, Cresthaven Park, Harbors Edge Park, Annie Addely Gillis Park, and Scott Meyers Memorial Park. Fern Forest Nature Center is just across the Coconut Creek city boundary.

Pompano Beach Community Park features an aquatic center, pickleball courts, basketball courts, soccer fields, jogging paths, and baseball fields. Prior to 2008, this park was the location of the Pompano Beach Municipal Stadium, which served as the spring training camp for the Washington Senators from 1961 to 1971 and the Texas Rangers from 1972 through 1986.

== Government ==
In 2004, John Rayson became the first elected mayor of Pompano Beach. Prior mayors had been selected by city commissioners from among themselves. The vice mayor continues to be selected by city commissioners from among themselves. At the federal level, Pompano Beach is located in Florida's 20th congressional district, which was represented by Democrat Sheila Cherfilus-McCormick. The current Mayor at Large is Rex Hardin.

== Media ==
Pompano Beach is a part of the Miami–Fort Lauderdale–Hollywood media market, which is the twelfth-largest radio market and the seventeenth-largest television market in the United States. Its primary daily newspapers are the South Florida Sun-Sentinel and The Miami Herald, and their Spanish-language counterparts El Sentinel and El Nuevo Herald. Local Pompano-based media includes The Pompano Pelican, the longtime local weekly newspaper; the Deerfield-Pompano Beach Forum, published by the Sun-Sentinel Company; Pompano Post Community Newspaper and PompanoFun.com, a website focusing on local entertainment and events; and television program Today in Pompano.

== Infrastructure ==
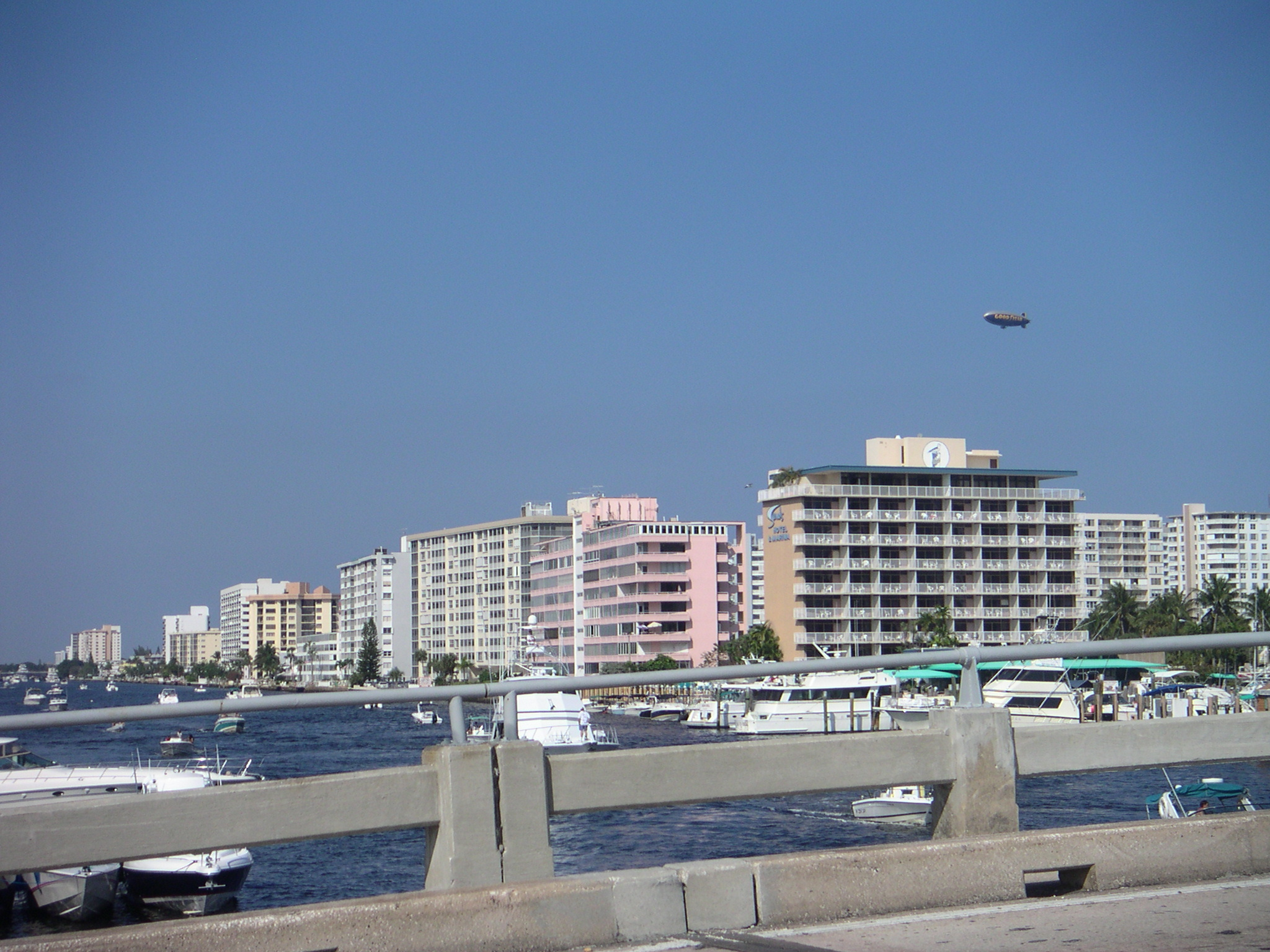
Pompano Beach apartments and hotels seen from Atlantic Boulevard

=== Transportation ===
The South Florida Regional Transportation Authority has its headquarters in Pompano Beach, located next to the Pompano Beach Tri-Rail station.

In addition to Tri-Rail, Pompano Beach is also served by several bus routes operated by Broward County Transit. Two major transfer points are the Northeast Transit Center and Pompano Citi Centre.

== Notable people ==
- Jahseh Onfroy (1998–2018), better known as XXXTentacion, rapper
- Kodak Black (born 1997), rapper
- Roland "Bad Bad Leroy Brown" Daniels (1950–1988), professional wrestler
- Jaydes (born 2006), rapper
- Tyrone Carter (born 1976), professional football player, Pittsburgh Steelers
- Henri Crockett (born 1974), professional football player, Atlanta Falcons
- Zack Crockett (born 1972), professional football player, Oakland Raiders
- Anthony F. DePalma (1904–2005), orthopedic surgeon and professor, moved to Pompano Beach in 1976 and retired there
- Blanche General Ely and Joseph A. Ely (1903–1994), school founders and principals; see Ely Educational Museum
- Further Seems Forever, emo band
- Mark Gilbert (born 1956), Major League Baseball player, and US Ambassador to New Zealand
- Al Goldstein (1936–2013), pornographer and former publisher of Screw magazine
- Kelsey Grammer (born 1955), actor in the NBC sitcoms Cheers and Frasier
- Paolo Gregoletto (born 1985), bass player in metal band Trivium
- Al Harris (born 1974), professional football player, Green Bay Packers
- Jeremiah Healy (1948–2014), American crime novelist
- Lamar Jackson (born 1997), Heisman winner, NFL MVP, football quarterback for the Baltimore Ravens
- Ingemar Johansson (1932–2009), former world heavyweight boxing champion
- Eddie Jones (born 1971), professional basketball player, Dallas Mavericks
- Barry Krauss (born 1957), professional football player, Miami Dolphins
- Jerome McDougle (born 1978), professional football player, Philadelphia Eagles
- Stockar McDougle (born 1977), professional football player Jacksonville Jaguars
- Harry Newman (1909–2000), All-Pro football quarterback
- Richard Thomas Nolan (born 1937), writer, Episcopal Church canon, retired philosophy and religion professor
- Dan Nugent (1953–2001), professional football player, Washington Redskins
- Patrick Peterson (born 1990), professional football player, Arizona Cardinals
- Jason Pierre-Paul (born 1989), professional football player, New York Giants
- Jabari Price (born 1992), professional football player, Minnesota Vikings
- Jordan Pundik (born 1972), vocalist in pop-punk band New Found Glory
- Jake "The Snake" Roberts (born 1955), professional wrestler, retired WWE
- Rashard Robinson (born 1995), professional football player, New York Jets
- Esther Rolle (1920–1998), actress, from television's Good Times and Maude
- Clint Session (born 1984), professional football player, Indianapolis Colts
- Corey Simon (1977), professional football player, Indianapolis Colts
- Andrew Smith (born 1992), American-Latvian basketball player in the Israeli Basketball Premier League
- Harold Solomon (born 1952), tennis player ranked No. 5 in the world in 1980
- Brett Swenson (born 1988), professional football player, Indianapolis Colts
- Natalie Vértiz (born 1991), Peruvian American beauty pageant titleholder who represented Peru at Miss Universe 2011
- Fahreta Živojinović (born 1960), better known as Lepa Brana, Bosniak and Yugoslavian pop-folk singer

== Sister cities ==
Pompano Beach's sister cities are:

- Itajaí, Brazil
- San Clemente del Tuyú, Argentina
- Termoli, Italy

== See also ==
- Merritt Boat & Engine Works
- Kester Cottages
