= Brazilian Americans =

Americans of Brazilian birth or descent

Brasilo-americanos or Brasileiros nos Estados Unidos (Portuguese)
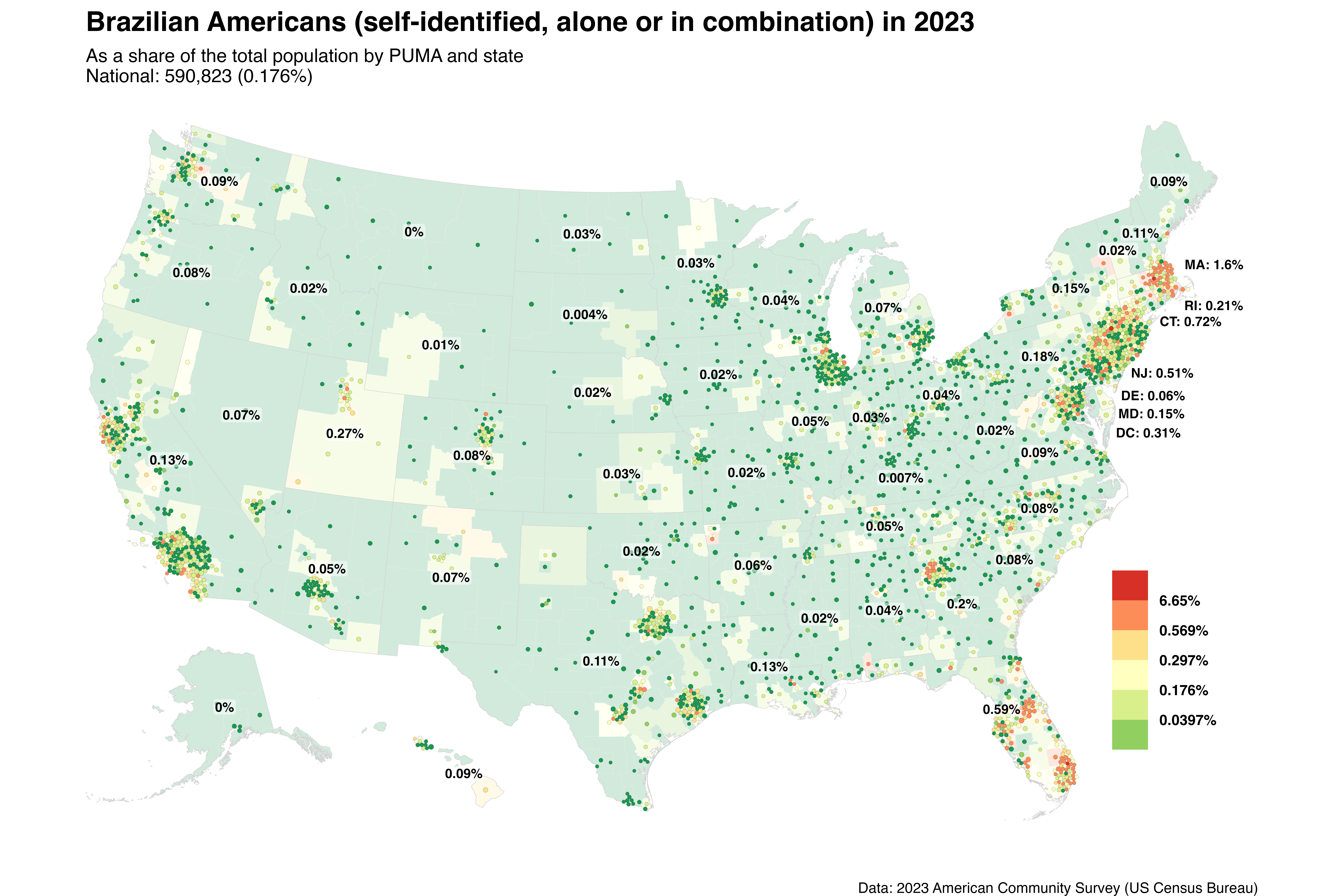

Total population
- 620,000 (foreign-born population) 1,280,000 (by ancestry) 1,775,000 (Total population) 0.5% of the American population

Regions with significant populations
- Newark; Boston; New York City; Miami; Orlando; Los Angeles; Bridgeport, Connecticut; Washington D.C.; Atlanta; Philadelphia; Dallas-Fort Worth metroplex

Languages
- Portuguese, English, Porglish

Religion
- Predominantly: Christianity; Minority: Mormonism; Judaism

Related ethnic groups
- Portuguese Americans • Italian Americans • Cape Verdean Americans • Brazilians • Multiracial Americans

Brazilian Americans (Portuguese: brasilo-americanos or americanos de origem brasileira) are Americans who are of full or partial Brazilian ancestry. The Brazilian Ministry of Foreign Affairs estimates the Brazilian American population to be 1,775,000, the largest of any Brazilian diaspora. The largest wave of Brazilian migration to the United States occurred in the late 1980s and early 1990s as a response to hyperinflation in Brazil. Even after inflation stabilized in 1994, Brazilian immigration continued as Brazilians left in search of higher wages in the United States.

== Population and classification ==
In 2020, the Brazilian Ministry of Foreign Affairs estimated the number of Brazilian Americans to be 1,775,000, 0.53% of the US population at the time. However, the 2019 United States Census Bureau American Community Survey estimated that there were 499,272 Americans who would report Brazilian ancestry. This discrepancy can be attributed to the American Community Survey reporting on ancestry, not nationality, since many Brazilians, by national origin, are not ancestrally- or ethnically (native)-Brazilian; families with varying degrees of native ancestry and mixed bloodlines (mestiços) are not uncommon, though.

Despite Portugal being a part of the Iberian Peninsula, and the Portuguese language being considered a romance language and a Latin-based language, like Spanish (as well as the country's significant role in the history of Spain), Brazilians are not considered a "Hispanic" ethnic group, largely due to Brazil's colonial history as a Lusophone (Portuguese-speaking) nation and not a Hispanophone, or Spanish-speaking, one. As such, their populations may or may not accept the term "Latino", let alone "Hispanic". This notion was reflected in the 1980 United States census, where only 18% of Brazilian Americans considered themselves "Hispanic".

In 1976, the U.S. Congress passed the Hispanic-American Voting Rights Act which mandated the collection and analysis of data on Hispanic Americans. The legislation describes Hispanic Americans as being "Americans who identify themselves as being of Spanish-speaking background and trace their origin or descent from Cuba, Central America, Mexico, Puerto Rico and South America, and other Spanish-speaking countries." This includes 20 Spanish-speaking nations from Latin America, as well as European Spain, but not Portugal or Brazil.

Whether or not Brazilians are Latino is controversial among Brazilian Americans. Some attribute this to the large cultural and linguistic divide between Spanish-speaking Latin America and Portuguese-speaking Brazil. While the official United States census category of "Latino" includes "persons of South American origin", it does not explicitly include Brazilians, nor does it mention persons of the English-speaking nations Belize and Guyana, the Francophone territories of French Guiana and Haiti, or Suriname, which has a Dutch lingua franca. Other U.S. government agencies, such as the Small Business Administration and the Department of Transportation, specifically include Brazilians within their definition of Latino for purposes of awarding minority preferences by defining Latino Americans to include persons of South American ancestry or persons who have Portuguese cultural roots.

== History ==
People from Brazil (from historical João Pessoa and Recife, under Dutch control in Northeast Brazil - Paraíba and Pernambuco states) are recorded among the Refugees and Settlers that arrived in New Netherland in what is now New York City in the 17th century among the Dutch West India Company settlers. The first arrivals of Brazilian emigres were formally recorded in the 1940s. Previously, Brazilians were not identified separately from other South Americans. Of approximately 234,761 South American emigres arrived in the United States between 1820 and 1960, at least some of them were Brazilian. The 1960 United States census report recorded 27,885 Americans of Brazilian ancestry.

From 1960 until the mid-1980s, between 1,500 and 2,300 Brazilian immigrants arrived in the United States each year. During the mid-1980s, economic crisis struck Brazil. As a result, between 1986 and 1990 approximately 1.4 million Brazilians emigrated to other parts of the world. It was not until this time that Brazilian emigration reached significant levels. Thus, between 1987 and 1991, an estimated 20,800 Brazilians arrived in the United States. A significant number of them, 8,133 Brazilians, arrived in 1991. The 1990 U.S. Census Bureau recorded that there are about 60,000 Brazilians living in the United States. However, other sources indicate that there are nearly 100,000 Brazilians living in the New York City metropolitan area (including Northern New Jersey) alone, in addition to sizable Brazilian communities in Atlanta, Boston, Framingham, Philadelphia, Washington, D.C., Los Angeles, Miami, Orlando, and Houston.

There are many hypotheses regarding the formation of Brazilian migration to the United States. Ana Cristina Martes, a professor of sociology at Fundação Getúlio Vargas Brazil, helped explain the first few migratory trips to the U.S. which took place in Boston. She noticed a series of six events that could have led the cycle of migration:

1. During World War II, American engineers from the Boston area traveled to Governador Valadares to work on the region's mineral extraction and railroad. When they came back to the States, many of them brought their Brazilian domestic employees.
2. After the war, some Bostonians strengthen the relationship with Valadares [by coming back on more trips for more precious stones].
3. In the 1960s, newspapers from Rio [De Janeiro] and São Paulo published a number of ads offering jobs to Brazilian women interested in working as maids in Boston.
4. [During the same time period, a business man from Massachusetts] hired twenty soccer players from Belo Horizonte to form a soccer team. Many of them stayed permanently and helped their family join them in the States.
5. At the end of the decade, a group of more than ten young people from Governador Valadares decided to come to the States to spend more time on 'an adventurous trip...in a country of their dreams'. They also settled permanently and helped their families join them.
6. Several Brazilians came to study in Boston and decided not to return to Brazil.

Before the 1960s there was insignificant movement from Brazil to the United States. It was between the 1960s through 1980s that some Brazilians went to the United States as tourists to visit places such as Disney World, New York and other tourist destinations. Brazilians traveled during that time because the country was growing at an average 7% annually and projecting 4% annual increase in GDP per capita. After the 1980s, the peak of the economic cycle quickly dropped to a long lasting trough. World Bank data shows that the Brazilian GDP dipped to 1287.6 (USD per capita) at its lowest point in 1985. This economic strife was a major factor pushing Brazilians to move elsewhere. The Brazilian Federal Police reported that in the 1980s about 1.25 million people (1% of the population) emigrated to countries such as the U.S. This was the first time Brazilians emigrated in significant numbers. They wanted to stay in the States until the crisis was over. They also had some work connections and known opportunities in the East Coast, which increased facilitated the move. In 1980, there were 41,000 Brazilians and 82,000 by 1990. Neoclassical Economics Theory explains the beginning flow of migration in 1980 indicating that individuals were rational actors who looked for better opportunities away from home to improve his/her lifestyle. Since the crisis hit the Brazilian middle class hard, many chose to leave to optimize their income, find better jobs, and more stable social conditions by doing marginal benefit analysis.

There was another wave of emigration in 2002 where Brazilian Ministry of Foreign Affairs estimated that 1.96 million Brazilians had left again as the country continued to lack economic stability. This number reflected another 1% of the Brazilian population 22 years later ("Population, total"). This wave of migration was different from the one in the 1980s. As shown by Martes' research, migration evolved even more with a creation and better establishment of social networks. When Bostonians first brought back a wave of Brazilian domestic workers, Brazilians would send information to their homes about their experiences and opportunities. This connection is what Douglas Massey defined as Social Capital Theory. Migrants create social ties in the host country facilitating the move at lower cost and creating an incentive to join their community in another country. Legal migrants who had entered the U.S. brought their immediate relatives resulting in an increase of the Brazilian immigrant population.

== Lawful Permanent Resident Status ==
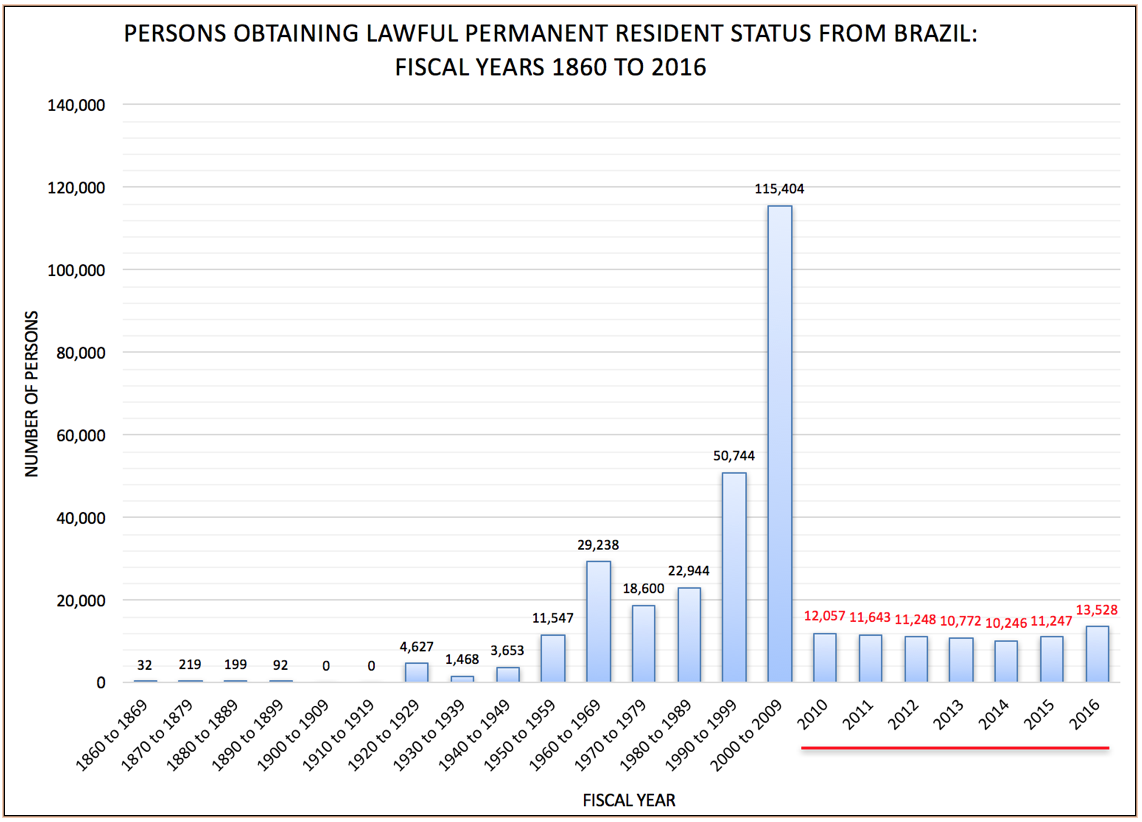
The figure portrays a historical pattern of Brazilians obtaining lawful permanent resident status. Each bar represents a 10-year fiscal period. The last 6 years accumulated 80,741 persons obtaining permanent status. The number of persons from 2010 to 2020 will more likely reflect the 10-year fiscal period from 2000 to 2009. However, the number of people will increase slightly at a much lower rate than from 1990–1999 to 2000–2009. Source: Yearbook of Immigration Statistics 2016.

Brazilians obtained the highest number of lawful permanent residence status between 2000 and 2009 and many were eligible to naturalize. During that time, 115,404 Brazilians received permanent status and from 2010 through 2016, already 80,741 persons had received theirs. Still, it seems as if many received status, but if you compare to the total foreign born Brazilian population, the numbers are small. In 2010 the Brazilian foreign born population was 340,000 and only 12,057 (or 4% of) persons obtained legal status. Of the 336,000 foreign born Brazilians in 2014, only 10,246 (or 3%) received permanent status in the same year. Even though few people are obtaining permanent status, there was a noticeable spike previously mentioned between 2000 and 2009. The increase in acceptance was due to two main factors: the 1986 Immigration Reform and Control Act and economic and political turmoil in Brazil.

The top three classes of admissions for Brazilians obtaining lawful permanent status in the U.S. in 2016 was family-sponsored, employment, and immediate relatives of U.S. citizens. Each category of admissions makes up of 4%, 25%, and 68% respectively of the total individuals.

== Socioeconomics ==
=== Education ===
The 2000 U.S. census showed that 34.5 percent of Brazilians in the U.S. had completed four or more years of college. There's a difference between female and male attainment. While 34.7% of men obtained a bachelor's degree or higher, 45.2% of women obtained one. while the corresponding number for the general U.S. population is only 24.4 percent. However, although effectively many Brazilian immigrants in the United States are university educated, most of these immigrants fail to get well-qualified jobs and have to get lower-status jobs because the United States doesn't recognize their qualifications and also because many of them do not speak English.

Second-and third-generation Brazilian Americans tend to have better jobs; they have been educated in the United States, speak English, and have citizenship. A certain amount of Brazilians have middle to upper class socioeconomic status in Brazil so when they immigrate into the United States they are able to blend into certain American communities. As they received a higher amount of education in Brazil compared to the general population it only eases that transition into American communities, as a result some may seek to attain citizenship which only further allows Brazilians to fit into that middle class category.

Due to the increase of Brazilian Americans residing in the United States there are many concerns regarding the preservation of certain traditions and also while maintaining Portuguese as their heritage language. Certain policies in all-English classrooms suppress bilingualism in children who grew up speaking both English and Portuguese, thus as a result children of immigrants experience a decrease in ethnic development with assimilation completely taking over within three generations.

Some Brazilians reside in the United States with the fear of deportation and discrimination against them, however as some Brazilians are racially white or can pass off as white who are proficient in English live in the United States with their concerns becoming smaller and smaller. They tend to self-identify as racially white to avoid certain Hispanic/Latino communities in hopes of not drawing certain attention towards themselves.

=== Work ===
Studies show that upon arrival, Brazilian women recurrently find themselves inserted into transnational care networks, working as nannies, elderly caregivers, domestic workers, sex workers, and also, in the beauty industry.

=== Healthcare ===
Studies that took place in Newark, New Jersey revealed before the COVID-19 pandemic that many Brazilian-Americans had underlying conditions such as uncontrolled hypertension and obesity, but only 8% had health insurance.

Programs such as the CDC's REACH (Racial and Ethnic Approaches to Community Health) initiative have sought to confront these disparities by focusing on community education, outreach, and improving access to preventive care and nutritious food. Doing so will reduce the prevalence of chronic diseases like obesity and hypertension in underserved populations, including Brazilian Americans.

However, systemic barriers persist, Immigrant communities such as Brazilian Americans, are negatively impacted by inadequate public health infrastructure and the lack of culturally acceptable care. Language differences and unfamiliarity with the healthcare system exacerbate these issues, often deterring individuals from seeking necessary care. Improving equity in the healthcare system will require expanded community-based healthcare services, and bilingual healthcare professionals.

== Culture ==
=== Religion ===
Although the majority of Brazilian Americans are Roman Catholic, there also significant numbers of Protestants (Mainline, Evangelical, Pentecostalism, Non-denominational Protestantism etc.), LDS, Orthodox, Irreligious people (including atheists and agnostics), followed by minorities such as Spiritists, Buddhists, Jews and Muslims.

As with wider Brazilian culture, there is set of beliefs related through syncretism that might be described as part of a Spiritualism–Animism continuum, that includes: Spiritism (or Kardecism, a form of spiritualism that originated in France, often confused with other beliefs also called espiritismo, distinguished from them by the term espiritismo [de] mesa branca), Umbanda (a syncretic religion mixing African animist beliefs and rituals with Catholicism, Spiritism, and indigenous lore), Candomblé (a syncretic religion that originated in the Brazilian state of Bahia and that combines African animist beliefs with elements of Catholicism), and Santo Daime (created in the state of Acre in the 1930s by Mestre Irineu (also known as Raimundo Irineu Serra) it is a syncretic mix of Folk Catholicism, Kardecist Spiritism, Afro-Brazilian religions and a more recent incorporation of Indigenous American practices and rites). People who profess Spiritism make up 1.3% of the country's population, and those professing Afro-Brazilian religions make up 0.3% of the country's population.

=== Politics ===
Brazilian American voters heavily support the Democratic Party. A majority of Brazilian Americans voted for the Democratic presidential candidates in the 2016 and 2020 elections by 78 and 71% respectively.

=== Cuisine ===
Brazilian steakhouses, known as churrascarias, have gained popularity in the United States. The most well-known Brazilian restaurant chains in the U.S. are Fogo de Chão and Texas de Brazil. These establishments offer traditional Brazilian foods like Pão de Queijo and Feijoada.

== Demographics ==
Brazilians began immigrating to the United States in large and increasing numbers in the 1980s as a result of worsening economic conditions in Brazil at that time. However, many of the Brazilians who have emigrated to the United States since this decade have been undocumented. More women have immigrated to the United States from Brazil than men, with the 1990 and 2000 U.S. censuses showing there to be ten percent more female than male Brazilian Americans. The top three metropolitan areas by Brazilian population are New York City (72,635), Boston (63,930), and Miami (43,930).

=== U.S. states with the largest Brazilian-American populations ===
State/Territory	Brazilian American Population (2024 estimate)	Percentage
Alabama	2,235	0.0%
Alaska	289	0.0%
Arizona	4,560	0.0%
Arkansas	877	0.0%
California	64,122	0.1%
Colorado	5,344	0.1%
Connecticut	30,065	0.8%
Delaware	785	0.0%
District of Columbia	1,564	0.2%
Florida	134,807	0.6%
(Georgia (U.S. state)) Georgia	19,578	0.2%
Hawaii	1,943	0.1%
Idaho	1,219	0.0%
Illinois	9,381	0.0%
Indiana	2,842	0.0%
Iowa	1,339	0.0%
Kansas	2,083	0.0%
Kentucky	1,439	0.0%
Louisiana	3,198	0.0%
Maine	738	0.0%
Maryland	12,337	0.2%
Massachusetts	137,449	2.0%
Michigan	6,634	0.0%
Minnesota	3,218	0.0%
Mississippi	726	0.0%
Missouri	3,296	0.0%
Montana	364	0.0%
Nebraska	807	0.0%
Nevada	4,732	0.1%
New Hampshire	4,300	0.3%
New Jersey	56,188	0.6%
New Mexico	819	0.0%
New York	36,024	0.2%
North Carolina	10,131	0.2%
North Dakota	279	0.0%
Ohio	5,808	0.0%
Oklahoma	1,580	0.0%
Oregon	2,890	0.0%
Pennsylvania	17,565	0.1%
Rhode Island	3,111	0.3%
South Carolina	7,061	0.1%
South Dakota	228	0.0%
Tennessee	3,613	0.0%
Texas	29,745	0.1%
Utah	9,684	0.3%
Vermont	398	0.0%
Virginia	10,173	0.1%
Washington	9,188	0.1%
West Virginia	398	0.0%
Wisconsin	2,219	0.0%
Wyoming	218	0.0%
US (2024)	669,591	0.2%

University of Arizona professor Elaine Rubinstein-Avila notes that Brazilian American newspapers are thriving in Massachusetts communities. The Brazilian Times publishes 36,000 copies per week.

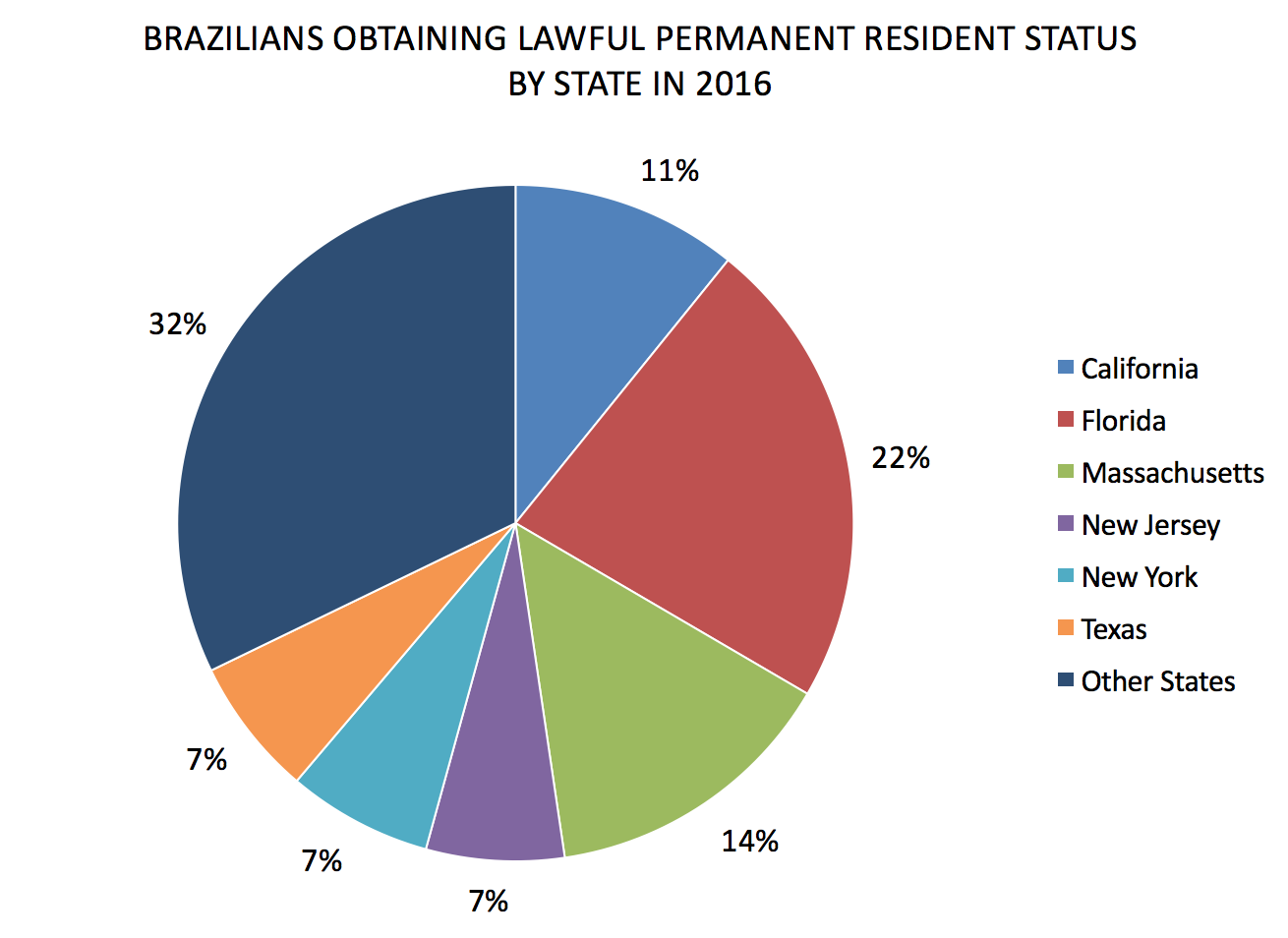
Brazilians obtaining lawful permanent resident status by the top 6 states in the United States. Source: Yearbook of Immigration Statistics 2016

=== Brazilian American communities ===
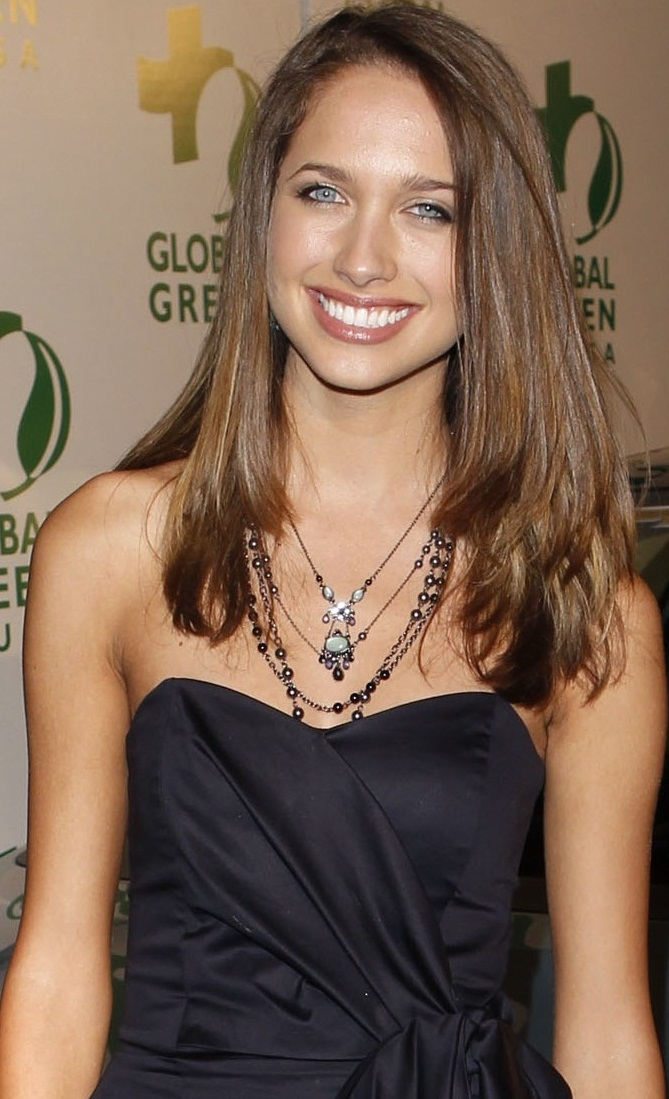
Maiara Walsh at the Global Green USA 2010 Pre-Oscar Party in Hollywood, California

- New York City is a leading point of entry for Brazilians entering the United States. West 46th Street between Fifth and Sixth Avenues in Manhattan has been designated Little Brazil, and has historically been a commercial center for Brazilians living in or visiting New York City. Another NYC neighborhood home to many Brazilian Americans is located in Astoria, Queens.
- Newark, New Jersey is home to many Brazilian and Portuguese-Americans, most prominently in the city's Ironbound district.
- Massachusetts, particularly the Boston metropolitan area, has a sizable Brazilian immigrant population. Framingham has the highest percentage of Brazilians of any municipality in Massachusetts. Somerville has the highest number of Brazilians of any municipality in Massachusetts. Large populations also exist in Everett, Barnstable, Lowell, Marlborough, Hudson, Malden, Shrewsbury, Worcester, Milford, Fitchburg, Leominster, Falmouth, Revere, Edgartown, Peabody, Lancaster, Dennisport, Chelsea, Lawrence, Vineyard Haven, Oak Bluffs, Millbury, and Leicester.
- Florida's large Brazilian community is mostly centered around the southeastern corridor, particularly the islands and northeastern section of Miami-Dade County (North Bay Village, Bay Harbor Islands, Miami Beach, Surfside, Key Biscayne, Aventura, and Sunny Isles Beach) with the exception of Doral. In Broward County, the population is centered on the northeastern part as well (Deerfield Beach, Pompano Beach, Oakland Park, Coconut Creek, Lighthouse Point, and Sea Ranch Lakes), with some living also in Palm Beach County (Boca Raton). There are also many Brazilians living in Orange County and Osceola County, particularly in the cities of Orlando and Kissimmee. There is also a growing Brazilian American population on the southside of Jacksonville.
- Philadelphia, Pennsylvania has a vibrant Brazilian community, mostly settling in the Northeast section of the city, in communities such as Oxford Circle, Summerdale, Frankford, Juniata Park, Lawndale, Fox Chase, and Rhawnhurst. Many of the Brazilian residents started to come to Philadelphia during the early 2000s, opening restaurants, boutiques, supermarkets, and other stores along Bustleton, Castor, and Cottman Avenues.
- Smaller, but highly concentrated Brazilian communities reside in Riverside, Delran, Cinnaminson, Palmyra, Delanco, Beverly, Edgewater Park, and Burlington, all within New Jersey.
- Los Angeles, California's Brazilian residents have tended to settle, if not form distinct ethnic enclaves in, the county's southern beach cities (Venice, Los Angeles; and suburbs of Lawndale; Long Beach; Manhattan Beach; and Redondo Beach) and Westside neighborhoods near and south of the 10 (Palms, Los Angeles; Rancho Park, Los Angeles; and West Los Angeles; and the suburb of Culver City). The city's greatest concentration of Brazilian American businesses began appearing in the late 1980s along Venice Boulevard's north border between Culver City and Palms (between Overland Avenue and Sepulveda Avenue).
- Chicago, Illinois' Brazilian population began with the migration of Portuguese Sephardi Jews who had fled to Brazil during the World War II era. After World War II, many Sephardim successfully circumvented restrictive U.S. immigration laws, to join the large and largely Ashkenazi population in the Chicago area. However, it was not until the 1970s, did a visible Brazilian community begin to develop in Chicago. The Flyers Soccer Club was founded by a group of young men who desired to bring Brazilian soccer culture to the Chicago area. The Flyers Soccer Club eventually transformed into a multifaceted community organization called the Luso-Brazilian Club. The group was headquartered in Chicago's Lakeview neighborhood. The group declined in the late 1980s. As Brazilians emigrated to the United States in large numbers in the 1980s and 1990s, Chicago's Brazilian population remained comparatively small, numbering no more than several thousand people by 2000. The FIFA World Cups have attracted the attention of Chicago's Brazilian population through the years, leading to the development of some Brazilian soccer-interested gatherings in the area.

The top U.S. states by Brazilian ancestry population

The top U.S. counties by Brazilian immigrant population The national total being 433,500 persons estimated from the American Community Survey for 2015 - 2019 via the Migration Policy Institute website

1) Middlesex County, Massachusetts—34,300

2) Broward County, Florida ------------------- 24,700

3) Miami-Dade County, Florida ------------- 17,100

4) Orange County, Florida -------------------- 15,800

5) Palm Beach County, Florida ------------- 12,500

6) Los Angeles County, California -------- 11,900

7) Fairfield County, Connecticut ----------- 11,900

8) Essex County, New Jersey --------------- 10,100

9) Worcester County, Massachusetts --- 9,700

10) Suffolk County, Massachusetts ------ 7,500

11) San Diego County, California ----------- 6,100

12) Manhattan Borough, New York -------- 6,000

13) Montgomery County, Maryland -------- 5,700

14) Essex County, Massachusetts --------- 5,600

15) Queens Borough, New York ------------- 5,200

16) Norfolk County, Massachusetts ------ 5,200

17) Harris County, Texas ------------------------ 5,100

18) Westchester County, New York -------- 4,600

19) Cobb County, Georgia ---------------------- 4,600

20) Philadelphia County, Pennsylvania—4,500

21) Union County, New Jersey --------------- 4,400

22) King County, Washington ----------------- 4,100

23) Monmouth County, New Jersey ------- 3,900

24) Plymouth County, Massachusetts --- 3,800

25) Orange County, California ---------------- 3,800

26) Cook County, Illinois ------------------------ 3,800

27) Duval County, Florida ------------------------ 3,750

28) Contra Costa County, California ------- 3,600

29) Barnstable County, Massachusetts --- 3,600

U.S. communities with high percentages of people of Brazilian ancestry

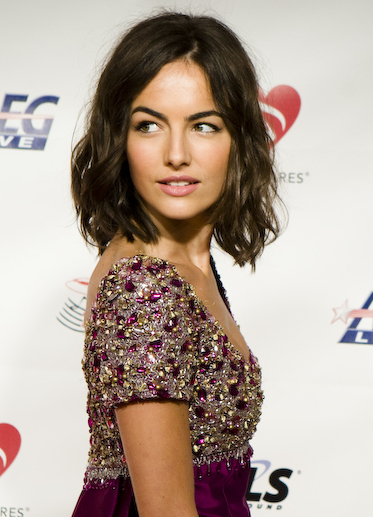
Camilla Belle in 2009, actress, director and producer

According to ePodunk, a website, the top 50 U.S. communities with the highest percentages of people claiming Brazilian ancestry are:

1. North Bay Village, Florida 6.00%
2. Riverside, New Jersey 5.00%
3. Danbury, Connecticut 4.90%
4. Harrison, New Jersey 4.80%
5. Framingham, Massachusetts 4.80%
6. Somerville, Massachusetts 4.50%
7. Kearny, New Jersey 3.70%
8. Vineyard Haven, Massachusetts 3.60%
9. Deerfield Beach, Florida 3.50%
10. Everett, Massachusetts 3.20%
11. Marlborough, Massachusetts 3.10%
12. Long Branch, New Jersey 2.80%
13. Edgartown, Massachusetts 2.70%
14. Newark, New Jersey 2.50%
15. Doral, Florida 2.50%
16. Oak Bluffs, Massachusetts 2.50%
17. Miami Beach, Florida 2.20%
18. Hillside, New Jersey 2.20%
19. Hudson, Massachusetts 2.20%
20. Oakland Park, Florida 2.10%
21. South River, New Jersey 2.10%
22. Cliffside Park, New Jersey2.10%
23. Tisbury, Massachusetts 2.10%
24. Fairview, New Jersey 2.00%
25. Aventura, Florida 1.90%
26. Lauramie, Indiana 1.80%
27. Revere, Massachusetts 1.70%
28. Malden, Massachusetts 1.70%
29. Sea Ranch Lakes, Florida 1.70%
30. Surfside, Florida 1.60%
31. Barnstable, Massachusetts 1.60%
32. Lowell, Massachusetts 1.60%
33. Ojus, Florida 1.60%
34. Washington, Ohio 1.60%
35. Naugatuck, Connecticut 1.60%
36. Milford, Massachusetts 1.50%
37. Dennis Port, Massachusetts 1.50%
38. Keene, Texas 1.50%
39. Key Biscayne, Florida 1.50%
40. Mount Vernon, New York 1.50%
41. Avondale Estates, Georgia 1.50%
42. Sunny Isles Beach, Florida 1.50%
43. Riverside, New Jersey 1.40%
44. Trenton, Florida 1.40%
45. South Lancaster, Massachusetts 1.30%
46. Great River, New York 1.30%
47. Port Chester, New York 1.30%
48. Coconut Creek, Florida 1.20%
49. Belle Isle, Florida 1.20%
50. Big Pine Key, Florida 1.20%
51. Chelsea, Massachusetts 1.20%

=== U.S. communities with the most residents born in Brazil ===
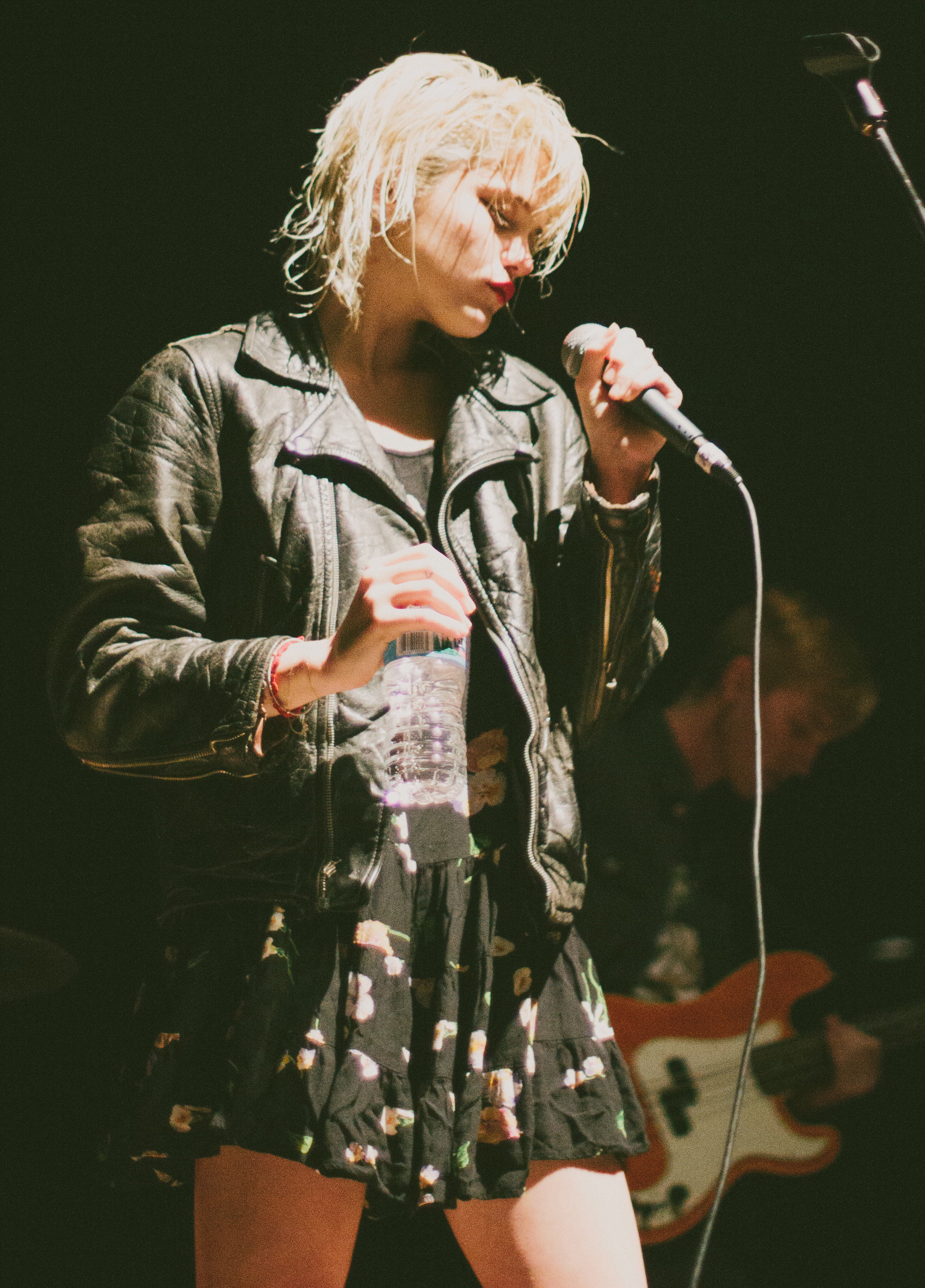
Sky Ferreira performing in St. Louis, MO

According to the social networking and information website City-Data, the top 25 U.S. communities with the highest percentage of residents born in Brazil are:

1. Loch Lomond, Florida 15.8%
2. Bonnie Loch-Woodsetter North, Florida 7.2%
3. North Bay Village, Florida 7.1%
4. East Newark, New Jersey 6.7%
5. Framingham, Massachusetts 6.6%
6. Harrison, New Jersey 5.8%
7. Danbury, Connecticut 5.6%
8. Somerville, Massachusetts 5.4%
9. Sunshine Ranches, Florida 5.1%
10. Flying Hills, Pennsylvania 5.1%
11. Deerfield Beach, Florida 4.7%
12. Fox River, Alaska 4.5%
13. Edgartown, Massachusetts 4.4%
14. West Yarmouth, Massachusetts 4.4%
15. Marlborough, Massachusetts 4.4%
16. Kearny, New Jersey 4.4%
17. Doral, Florida 4.1%
18. Everett, Massachusetts 4.0%
19. Long Branch, New Jersey 3.7%
20. Vineyard Haven, Massachusetts 3.4%
21. Hudson, Massachusetts 3.2%
22. Miami Beach, Florida 3.1%
23. Oak Bluffs, Massachusetts 3.0%
24. Oakland Park, Florida 3.0%
25. Pompano Beach Highlands, Florida 3.0%

Some City-Data information contradicts official government data from the Census Bureau. It is important to be mindful that Brazilian Americans sometimes decline to identify as Latino. Therefore, the above estimates may outnumber the census data figures for Latinos for the above census areas.

== Relations with Brazil ==
Voting Brazilian Americans and Brazilians abroad heavily favored the opposition's Aecio Neves and his pro-business center to center-right Brazilian Social Democracy Party in Brazil's 2014 general election. Aecio Neves and the Brazilian Social Democracy Party, or PSDB, were narrowly defeated in the 2014 runoff.

Brazilian Americans represent a large source of remittances to Brazil. Brazil receives approximately one quarter of its remittances from the U.S. (26% in 2012), out of a total amount of $4.9 billion received in 2012.

== Notable people ==
=== Arts ===
- Alice Braga, actress
- Andrew Matarazzo, actor
- Barbie Ferreira, actress
- Bebel Gilberto, singer
- Bill Handel, radio personality
- Blondfire, pop music band
- Bruna Dantas Lobato, writer
- Bruno Campos, actor
- Camila Mendes, actress
- Camilla Belle, actress
- Carlinhos Pandeiro de Ouro, percussionist
- Fabrizio Moretti, musician
- Gabriella Burnham, writer
- Marcelo Coelho, designer
- Gustavo Assis-Brasil, musician, composer, author
- Jair Oliveira, singer, musician, musical producer and songwriter
- Jared Gomes, rapper and vocalist from Hed PE
- Joe Penna, writer and director
- Jordana Brewster, actress
- Julia Goldani Telles, actress
- Kiko Loureiro, musician, Megadeth and Angra
- Linda Perry, musical producer and songwriter
- Maiara Walsh, actress
- Lateef Crowder dos Santos, actor and martial artist
- Max Cavalera, musician
- Mônica da Silva, singer, songwriter
- Morena Baccarin, actress
- Sergio Rossetti Morosini, sculptor, painter, author
- Naza, visual artist
- Rudy Mancuso, comedian and Internet personality
- Raw Leiba, actor, producer, director
- Sky Ferreira, singer, songwriter, model, and actress
- Sunspot, Marvel Comics character
- Yara Flor, DC Comics character
- Fire, DC Comics character
- Gisele Bündchen, model
- Adriana Lima, model

=== Sports ===
- Pelé, soccer player
- Amen Santo, Capoeira master.
- Anderson Silva, mixed martial artist
- Benny Feilhaber (born 1985), soccer player
- Bo Bichette, baseball player and MLB all-star
- Bob Burnquist, professional skateboarder
- Catarina Macario, soccer player
- Cairo Santos, Chicago Bears placekicker.
- Douglas Lima, mixed martial artist
- Dhiego Lima, mixed martial artist
- Gil de Ferran (1967–2023), race car driver and team owner
- Isadora Williams, figure skater
- John Crimber, bull rider and the 2026 PBR World Champion
- Johnny Cardoso, soccer player
- José Leonardo Ribeiro da Silva, soccer player
- Louise Lieberman (born 1977), soccer coach and former player
- Mackenzie Dern, mixed martial artist
- Nenê Hilário, basketball player
- Pietro Fittipaldi, Formula One driver
- Rafael dos Anjos, mixed martial artist
- Rafael Araujo-Lopes, American football player
- Ryan Hollweg, hockey player
- Scott Machado, basketball player
- Sergio Menezes, footvolley athlete and founder of pro tour
- Tay Conti, Professional Wrestler
- Tim Soares (born 1997), basketball player
- Vic Seixas (born 1923), Hall of Fame former top-10 tennis player
- Vicente Luque, mixed martial artist
- Yan Gomes, former baseball player, MLB all-star and champion
- Wanderlei Silva, mixed martial artist

=== Academics ===
- Ana Maria Carvalho, PhD., professor of linguistics at the Department of Spanish and Portuguese, University of Arizona
- Lin Chao, PhD., professor of ecology at the University of California, San Diego
- Flavia Colgan, political strategist
- Duília de Mello, PhD., ordinary professor of Physics and Astronomy and Vice Provost for Global Strategies at Catholic University of America.
- Marcelo Gleiser, PhD., physicist and astronomer. Appleton Professor of Natural Philosophy and Professor of Physics and Astronomy at Dartmouth College
- Ben Goertzel, PhD., former professor of Computer Sciences at the University of New Mexico, researcher of artificial intelligence, visiting faculty at Xiamen University
- Miguel Nicolelis, M.D., Ph.D., Duke School of Medicine Distinguished Professor of Neuroscience, Duke University Professor of Neurobiology, Biomedical Engineering and Psychology and Neuroscience, and founder of Duke's Center for Neuroengineering.
- Roberto Mangabeira Unger, LL.M., S.J.D., Roscoe Pound Professor of Law at the Harvard Law School (Harvard University)

=== Business ===
- David Neeleman, businessman, founder of JetBlue and Azul Brazilian Airlines
- Eduardo Saverin, Facebook co-founder; renounced his U.S. citizenship in 2011

=== Politics ===
- Gisele Barreto Fetterman, former Second Lady of Pennsylvania and wife of U.S. Senator John Fetterman
- George Santos, former U.S. Representative from New York's 3rd congressional district

== See also ==
- American Brazilians
- Portuguese Americans
- Brazilian Day - Brazilian American party of New York
- List of Brazilian Americans
- Brazilian British
- Brazil–United States relations
