= Microbial population biology =

Field of study in biology

Microbial population biology is the application of the principles of population biology to microorganisms.

== Distinguishing from other biological disciplines ==
Microbial population biology, in practice, is the application of population ecology and population genetics toward understanding the ecology and evolution of bacteria, archaebacteria, microscopic fungi (such as yeasts), additional microscopic eukaryotes (e.g., "protozoa" and algae), and viruses.

Microbial population biology also encompasses the evolution and ecology of community interactions (community ecology) between microorganisms, including microbial coevolution and predator-prey interactions. In addition, microbial population biology considers microbial interactions with more macroscopic organisms (e.g., host-parasite interactions), though strictly this should be more from the perspective of the microscopic rather than the macroscopic organism. A good deal of microbial population biology may be described also as microbial evolutionary ecology. On the other hand, typically microbial population biologists (unlike microbial ecologists) are less concerned with questions of the role of microorganisms in ecosystem ecology, which is the study of nutrient cycling and energy movement between biotic as well as abiotic components of ecosystems.

Microbial population biology can include aspects of molecular evolution or phylogenetics. Strictly, however, these emphases should be employed toward understanding issues of microbial evolution and ecology rather than as a means of understanding more universal truths applicable to both microscopic and macroscopic organisms. The microorganisms in such endeavors consequently should be recognized as organisms rather than simply as molecular or evolutionary reductionist model systems. Thus, the study of RNA in vitro evolution is not microbial population biology and nor is the in silico generation of phylogenies of otherwise non-microbial sequences, even if aspects of either may in some (especially unintentional) manner be analogous to evolution in actual microbial populations.

Microbial population biology can (and often does) involve the testing of more-general ecological and evolutionary hypotheses. Again, it is important to retain some emphasis on the microbe since at some point this "question-driven" microbial population biology becomes instead population biology using microorganisms. Because the point of departure of these potentially disparate emphases can be somewhat arbitrary, there exist vague and not universally accepted delimits around what the discipline of microbial population biology does and does not constitute.

== Microbial Population Biology Gordon conference ==
A Microbial Population Biology Gordon Research Conference is held every odd year, to date in New England (and usually in New Hampshire). The 2007 conference web page introduces the meetings as:

Microbial Population Biology covers a diverse range of cutting edge issues in the microbial sciences and beyond. Firmly founded in evolutionary biology and with a strongly integrative approach, past meetings have covered topics ranging from the dynamics and genetics of adaptation to the evolution of mutation rate, community ecology, evolutionary genomics, altruism, and epidemiology.

This meeting is never dull: some of the most significant and contentious issues in biology have been thrashed out here.

A history of the meeting can be found here.

The next Microbial Population Biology Gordon conference is scheduled for 2025. Information on past (and future) meetings is summarized as follows:

Past and Future GRC Microbial Population Biology Meetings
year	chair	vice chair(s)	additional information
2023 (2021 cancelled)	Vaughn Cooper, Rosie Redfield	Rees Kassen, Christina Burch	GRC page
2019	Benjamin B Kerr	Vaughn Cooper, Rosie Redfield	GRC page
2017	Eva Top & Larry Forney	Benjamin B Kerr	GRC page
2015	Michael Travisano	Eva Top & Larry Forney	GRC page
2013	Paul E. Turner	Michael Travisano	GRC page
2011	James J. Bull	Paul E. Turner	GRC page
2009	Anthony M. Dean	James J. Bull	GRC page
2007	Paul B. Rainey	Anthony M. Dean	GRC page
2005	Margaret A. Riley	Paul B. Rainey	GRC page
2003	Siv G. E. Andersson	Margaret A. Riley	GRC page
2001	Lin Chao	Siv G. E. Andersson	GRC page
1999	Howard Ochman	Richard Moxon	GRC page
1997	Julian P. Adams	Susan M. Rosenberg	GRC page
1995	Daniel E. Dykhuizen	Richard E. Lenski	GRC page
1993	John Roth	Rosie Redfield	GRC page
1991	Allan M. Campbell	Daniel E. Dykhuizen	GRC page
1989	Monica Riley	Conrad A. Istock	GRC page
1987	Barry G. Hall	Daniel E. Dykhuizen	GRC page
1985	Bruce R. Levin	Daniel L. Hartl Barry G. Hall	GRC page

== See also ==
- Microbial cooperation
- Microbial consortium
- Microbial food web
- Microbial intelligence
- Microbial loop
