= List of Brazilian Americans =

This is a list of Brazilian Americans, Americans of Brazilian ancestry, including both immigrants from Brazil who have American citizenship or residency, and their American descendants.

To be included in this list, the person must have a Wikipedia article showing they are Brazilian American or must have references showing they are Brazilian American and are notable.

== List ==
=== Americans of Brazilian descent ===
- Bo Bichette and Dante Bichette Jr. Baseball players (Brazilian mother)
- George Santos - former U.S. House Representative (Brazilian parents)
- Bebel Gilberto - singer (Brazilian parents)
- Hailey Bieber - model (Brazilian mother)
- Camila Mendes - actress (Brazilian parents)
- Rudy Mancuso - digital influencer and singer (Brazilian mother)
- Barbie Ferreira - model and actress (Brazilian mother)
- Jordana Brewster - actress (Brazilian mother)
- Sky Ferreira - singer (Brazilian father)
- Camilla Belle - actress (Brazilian mother)
- Christine Fernandes - actress (Brazilian parents)
- Jon-Michael Ecker - actor (Brazilian father)
- Linda Perry - singer (Brazilian mother)
- Sérgio Hondjakoff - actor (Brazilian parents)
- Maiara Walsh - actress (Brazilian mother)
- Bianca Santos - actress (Brazilian father)
- Indigo De Souza - singer (Brazilian father)
- Garren Stitt - actor (Brazilian mother)
- Julia Goldani Telles - actress and ballet dancer (Brazilian mother)
- Ezra Klein - journalist (Brazilian father)
- Raw Leiba - actor, producer and athlete (Brazilian mother)
- Isadora Williams - figure skater (Brazilian mother)
- Ed Soares - MMA manager and founder of LFA (Brazilian parents)
- Breno Giacomini - American football player (Brazilian parents)
- Charles Paraventi - actor (Brazilian parents)
- Ryan Hollweg - hockey player (Brazilian father)
- Alésia Glidewell - actress (Brazilian father)
- Bruce Driscoll - musician (Brazilian mother)
- Vic Seixas - former Hall of Fame Top-10 tennis player (Brazilian father)
- Lee Chamberlin - actress (Brazilian father)
- Rafael Araujo-Lopes - American football player (Brazilian parents)
- Antonio Campos (director) - filmmaker (Brazilian father)
- Flavia Colgan - political strategist (Brazilian mother)
- Erica Driscoll - musician (Brazilian mother)
- Vilayna LaSalle - model
- Johnny Cardoso - soccer player (Brazilian parents)
- Bob Klapisch - sportswriter (Brazilian parents)
- Camilla Araujo - influencer (Brazilian parents)

=== Born in/lived in Brazil, with American citizenship ===
- Lin Chao - biologist and geneticist
- Sergio Rossetti Morosini - artist, author and filmmaker.
- Francisco Costa (designer) - ex-fashion designer at Calvin Klein, born in Minas Gerais, won the Womenswear Designer of the Year at the 2006 and 2008 Council of Fashion Designers of America, and won the Fashion Design at the 2009 National Design Award.
- DePaiva family – Seventh-day Adventist missionaries who emigrated to Berrien Springs, Michigan in the 1990s. In December 2003, three of them were murdered in the island nation of Palau, where they were on a missionary stay.
- Walter Afanasieff - musician, producer, songwriter, composer and arranger, born in São Paulo. Won the 1999 Record of the Year Grammy Award and the 2000 Producer of the Year, Non-Classical Grammy Award.
- Fabrizio Moretti - installation artist, songwriter, producer and drummer, born in Rio de Janeiro. Won the Best Rock Album Grammy Award in 2021.
- Bruna Dantas Lobato - writer, born in Natal, won the National Book Award in 2023
- Kiko Loureiro - musician, born in Rio de Janeiro, won the 2017 Best Metal Performance Grammy Award.
- Rodrigo Santoro - actor, born in Rio de Janeiro. Won the 2004 Chopard Trophy of Male Revelation (Cannes Film Festival).
- Walter Salles - film director, born in Rio de Janeiro, won the Best Foreign Language Film at th 1998 Golden Globes, Oscar and Cannes Film Festival nominee.
- Marshall Brickman - screenwriter, born in Rio de Janeiro, won the Best Original Screenplay at the 1978 Oscar.
- Eduardo Saverin - entrepreneur, co-founder of Facebook
- Mike Krieger - entrepreneur, software engineer, born in São Paulo and co-founded Instagram
- Mario Caldato, Jr. - music producer, born in São Paulo, Grammy nominee.
- Morena Baccarin - actress, born in Rio de Janeiro
- Bruno Campos - actor, born in Rio de Janeiro, won the Outstanding Actor in a Comedy Series at the 1999 ALMA Awards and oscar nominee.
- Adriana Lima - model, born in Bahia.
- Romero Britto - visual artist, born in Recife.
- Lais Ribeiro - model, born in Piauí.
- Mateus Asato - musician, born in Mato Grosso do Sul, is formerly touring guitarist of American musical superduo composed of musicians Bruno Mars and Anderson .Paak. Silk Sonic, and Jessie J.
- Daniel Benzali - actor, born in Rio de Janeiro.
- Catarina Macario - soccer player born in São Luís.
- Gisele Bündchen - model and entrepreneur, born in Rio Grande do Sul.
- Fernanda Andrade - actress, born in São Paulo.
- Rafael Moreira - musician, born in Paraná, touring guitarist of American singers P!nk, Stevie Wonder, Steven Tyler and Christina Aguilera.
- Alessandra Ambrósio - model, born Rio Grande do Sul.
- Vítor Belfort - former UFC Light Heavyweight Champion, born in Rio de Janeiro.
- Valentina Sampaio - model, born in Ceará.
- Morena Baccarin - actress, born in Rio de Janeiro.
- Gizele Oliveira - model, born in Espirito Santo.
- Antônio Rodrigo Nogueira - former Interim UFC Heavyweight, born in Bahia.
- Luma Grothe - model, born in Santa Catarina.
- Henry Zaga - actor, born in Distrito Federal.
- Gracie Carvalho - model, born in São Paulo.
- Anderson Silva - UFC Middleweight Champion, born in São Paulo.
- Tiago Splitter - basketball player, born in Santa Catarina.
- Robert Rey - plastic surgeon
- Daniela Braga - model, born in São Paulo.
- Max Cavalera - musician, born in Minas Gerais frontman of Sepultura, Soulfly and Cavalera Conspiracy
- André Rienzo - baseball player, born in São Paulo.
- Ana Beatriz Barros - model, born in Minas Gerais.
- Nelson Cupello - soccer player
- Royce Gracie - UFC Hall of Famer, born in Rio de Janeiro.
- Leandro Barbosa - basketball player, born in São Paulo.
- Benny Feilhaber - soccer player, born in Rio de Janeiro.
- Lino Facioli - actor, born in São Paulo.
- Bruno Agra - musician, born in Rio de Janeiro, former drummer of the American band We Are Harlot.
- Val Fernandes - soccer player, born in São Paulo.
- Gisele Barreto Fetterman - wife of United States Senator John Fetterman, born in Rio de Janeiro.
- Yan Gomes - baseball player, born in São Paulo.
- Nenê Hilário - basketball player, born in São Paulo.
- Cairo Santos - American football player, born in São Paulo.
- Cristiane Justino - MMA fighter, born in Paraná, current Invicta FC World Featherweight Champion.
- SosMula - rapper, born in São Paulo, part of hip-hop duo City Morgue
- Fabrício Werdum - MMA fighter, former UFC Heavyweight Champion, born Rio Grande do Sul
- Roger Manganelli - musician, born in Rio Grande do Sul, bass guitarist and co-lead vocalist of the American ska-punk band Less Than Jake.
- Andrew Matarazzo - actor, born in São Paulo.
- Carlos Metidieri - soccer player, born in São Paulo.
- Carley Gracie - martial artist; member of the Gracie family
- Rolles Gracie Jr. - martial artist; member of the Gracie family
- Lyoto Machida - former UFC Light Heavyweight Champion, born in Bahia.
- Flávia de Oliveira - model, born in Paraná.
- Fabiana Semprebom - model, born in Paraná.
- Pelé (real name Edson Arantes do Nascimento) - retired professional soccer player, born in Minas Gerais, considered the best player of all time.
- Gugu Liberato - TV host, born in São Paulo.
- Silvio Santos - TV host, born in Rio de Janeiro, founder of Grupo Silvio Santos.
- Jorge Ben Jor - musician, singer and composer, born in Rio de Janeiro.
- Thaila Ayala - actress and model, born in São Paulo.
- Camila Coelho - blogger and make-up artist, born in Minas Gerais.
- Kaká - soccer player, born in São Paulo.
- Gabriela Duarte - actress, born in São Paulo.
- Alice Braga - actress, born in São Paulo.
- Rodrigo Amarante - musician, born in Rio de Janeiro; guitarist, producer and songwriter of Brazilian band Los Hermanos and Little Joy
- Eduardo Kobra - visual art muralist, born in São Paulo.
- Michelle Alves - model, born in Paraná.
- Lisalla Montenegro - model, born in Goiás.
- Pedro Andrade - model, actor and journalist, born in Rio de Janeiro.
- Paulo S. L. M. Barreto - born in Bahia, cryptographer, associate professor at University of Washington Tacoma
- Marcelo Coelho - designer
- Bob Burnquist - professional skateboarder, born in Rio de Janeiro.
- Sergio Cariello - comic book artist, born in Pernambuco.
- Carlos Saldanha - animator and filmmaker, Blue Sky Studios, born in São Paulo.
- Jovino Santos-Neto - musician and composer, born in Rio de Janeiro.
- Lateef Crowder dos Santos - actor and martial artist, born in Bahia.
- Bruno Barreto - film director, born in Rio de Janeiro.
- Guy Ecker - actor, born in São Paulo.
- Sergio Kato - actor, host, comedian and businessman, born in Minas Gerais.
- Naza - visual artist, from Piauí.
- David Neeleman - founder of JetBlue Airways; CEO and founder of Azul Airlines, born in São Paulo.
- Miguel Nicolelis - born in São Paulo, - Duke School of Medicine Distinguished Professor of Neuroscience; Duke University Professor of Neurobiology, Biomedical Engineering and Psychology and Neuroscience; and founder of Duke's Center for Neuroengineering
- Nívea Stelmann - actress, born in Rio de Janeiro.
- Roberto Mangabeira Unger, LL.M., S.J.D. - Roscoe Pound Professor of Law at the Harvard Law School (Harvard University), born in Rio de Janeiro
- Fernanda Machado - actress, born in Paraná.
- Carla Perez - dancer and TV host, born in Bahia.
- Ludmila Dayer - actress, born in Rio de Janeiro.
- Humberto Martins - actor, born in Rio de Janeiro.
- Ana Maria Carvalho - professor of linguistics at the Department of Spanish and Portuguese, University of Arizona
- Lucy D’Escoffier Crespo da Silva - astronomy student for whom asteroid 96747 Crespodasilva was named after
- Marcelo Gleiser - physicist and astronomer, Appleton Professor of Natural Philosophy and Professor of Physics and Astronomy at Dartmouth College
- Ben Goertzel - former professor of Computer Sciences at the University of New Mexico, researcher of artificial intelligence, visiting faculty at Xiamen University
- Bill Handel - radio personality
- Ludmila Dayer - Actress, Writer and Director
- Alice Mann - Minnesota state senator and former state representative
- Elaine Marzola - Nevada state assemblywoman
- Danillo Sena - Massachusetts state representative
- Priscila Sousa - Massachusetts state representative
- Palestina Zein "Tina" Isa – victim of an honor killing

== See also ==
- Immigration to the United States
- Brazilian diaspora
- List of Brazilian Britons
- Brazilian people
- List of Brazilians
