= Miss Brazil World 2012 =

Beauty pageant edition

- Date: April 2, 2012
- Presenters: Chris Barth
- Venue: Rede Pampa Studios, Porto Alegre, Rio Grande do Sul, Brazil
- Broadcaster: TV UOL; TV Pampa
- Entrants: 31
- Placements: 10
- Winner: Mariana Notarângelo; Rio de Janeiro

Miss Brazil World 2012 was the 23rd edition of the Miss Brazil World pageant and 7th under MMB Productions & Events. The contest took place on April 2, 2012. Representatives from various cities all throughout Brazil competed for the Brazilian crown for Miss World. Juceila Bueno of Rio Grande do Sul crowned Mariana Notarângelo of Rio de Janeiro at the end of the contest. Notarângelo represented Brazil at Miss World 2012. The contest was held at the Rede Pampa Studios in Porto Alegre, Rio Grande do Sul, Brazil.

== Results ==
| Final results | Contestant |
|---|---|
| Miss Brazil World 2012 | Rio de Janeiro - Mariana Notarângelo |
| 1st Runner-Up | Tocantins - Camila Serakides |
| 2nd Runner-Up | Pernambuco - Karine Barros |
| Top 6 | Amapá - Larissa Costa; Rio Grande do Sul - Andressa Mello; São Paulo - Mariane Silvestre |
| Top 10 | (United States) Estados Unidos-Brasil - Carol Lassance; Minas Gerais - Juliane Késsia; Pará - Aline Sales; Santa Catarina - Dionara Lermen |

=== Special awards ===
| Award | Winner |
|---|---|
| Best Skin | Amapá - Larissa Costa |
| Miss Popularity UOL | Rio Grande do Sul - Andressa Mello |

== Contestants ==
The contestants for Miss Brazil World 2012 were:

- Alagoas - Camila Reis
- Alagoas - Daniella Borçato
- Alagoas - Morgana Mello
- Amapá - Josilene Modesto
- Amapá - Larissa Costa
- Amazonas - Cecília Stadler
- Distrito Federal - Kellin Schmidt
- Espírito Santo - Flávia Monteiro
- (United States) Estados Unidos-Brasil - Carol Lassance
- Goiás - Evelly Barbosa
- Mato Grosso - Mariana Albuquerque
- Minas Gerais - Juliane Késsia
- Pará - Aline Sales
- Pará - Priscila Winny
- Paraíba - Benazira Djoco
- Paraíba - Larissa Almeida
- Paraná - Érica Henrique
- Pernambuco - Isabelle Sampaio
- Pernambuco - Karine Barros
- Pernambuco - Luzielle Vasconcellos
- Pernambuco - Mayra Albuquerque
- Piauí - Kahuany Tufaile
- Rio de Janeiro - Mariana Notarângelo
- Rio Grande do Norte - Késsia Cortez
- Rio Grande do Sul - Andressa Mello
- Rio Grande do Sul - Paula Helwanger
- Santa Catarina - Dionara Lermen
- Santa Catarina - Mariana Bahtke
- São Paulo - Ana Cecília Cunha
- São Paulo - Mariane Silvestre
- Tocantins - Camila Serakides
