= Rosemary Redfield =

Microbiologist

Rosie Redfield
- Born: Rosemary Jeanne Redfield
- Education: Monash University (BSc); McMaster University (MSc); Stanford University (PhD)
- Awards: Nature's 10 (2011)
- Scientific career
- Fields: Microbiology; Genetics; DNA; Evolution
- Workplaces: University of British Columbia; Harvard University; Johns Hopkins School of Medicine
- Thesis: Generation of cryptic lambda prophages in Escherichia coli K-12 (1987)
- Doctoral advisor: Allan M. Campbell
- Website: rrresearch.fieldofscience.com

Rosemary Jeanne Redfield is a microbiologist associated with the University of British Columbia where she worked as a faculty member in the Department of Zoology from 1993 until retiring in 2021.

== Education ==
Redfield completed her undergraduate degree in biochemistry at Monash University. She continued her education at McMaster University where she completed her MSc in 1980. Her thesis titled, "Methylation and chromatin conformation of adenovirus type 12 DNA sequences in transformed cells," dealt with the chromatin structure and SDNA methylation. Redfield received her PhD in Biological Sciences from Stanford University under Allan M. Campbell.

== Research and career ==
Redfield completed postdoctoral work at Harvard University with Richard Charles Lewontin and Johns Hopkins School of Medicine with Hamilton O. Smith, an American microbiologist and 1978 Nobel Laureate. She played an early role in the refutation of the GFAJ-1 "arsenic life" results of Felisa Wolfe-Simon. She joined University of British Columbia as a faculty member in 1993, primarily researching natural competence in bacteria, and has advocated for transparency in the research process. She retired in 2021.

=== Select publications ===
- Boulton, Alan; Myers, Richard S.; Redfield, Rosemary J. (1997-07-22). "The hotspot conversion paradox and the evolution of meiotic recombination". Proceedings of the National Academy of Sciences. 94 (15): 8058–8063. Bibcode:1997PNAS...94.8058B. doi:10.1073/pnas.94.15.8058. ISSN 0027-8424. PMC 21556. PMID 9223314.
- Redfield, Rosemary J. (2001). "Do bacteria have sex?". Nature Reviews Genetics. 2 (8): 634–639. doi:10.1038/35084593. ISSN 1471-0064. PMID 11483988. S2CID 5465846.
- Redfield, R (2002-08-01). "Is quorum sensing a side effect of diffusion sensing?". Trends in Microbiology. 10 (8): 365–370. doi:10.1016/s0966-842x(02)02400-9. ISSN 0966-842X. PMID 12160634.
- Redfield, Rosemary J.; Cameron, Andrew D. S.; Qian, Qing; Hinds, J.; Ali, Tahir R.; Kroll, J. Simon; Langford, Paul R. (2005-04-08). "A Novel CRP-dependent Regulon Controls Expression of Competence Genes in Haemophilus influenzae". Journal of Molecular Biology. 347 (4): 735–747. doi:10.1016/j.jmb.2005.01.012. ISSN 0022-2836. PMID 15769466.

== Awards ==
- CIHR Grant (1999) – Regulation of competence in haemophilus influenzae
- CIHR Grant (2012) – Regulation of CRP-S promoters in H. Influenzae and E. Coli
- Nominated by Nature as one of Nature's 10 people who mattered in 2011.
