= It Is Wood, It Is Stone =

2020 novel by Gabriella Burnham

- First edition
- Author: Gabriella Burnham
- Language: English
- Genre: Literary fiction
- Published: July 28, 2020
- Publisher: One World/Random House
- Publication place: United States and Brazil
- Pages: 214
- ISBN: 9781984855855

It Is Wood, It Is Stone is the debut novel of Brazilian-American novelist Gabriella Burnham. It was first published by One World, an imprint of Random House, in 2020.
