= Daniel Dykhuizen =

American ecologist

- Education: Stanford University; University of Chicago
- Scientific career
- Fields: Evolutionary Biology
- Workplaces: Purdue University; Washington University in St. Louis; Stony Brook University

Daniel Edward Dykhuizen (born October 31, 1942) is an American ecologist. He is emeritus professor of Ecology and Evolution at Stony Brook University in New York. His major scientific interest is in evolutionary biology, specifically experimental evolution using bacteria and the population genetics of bacterial pathogens, which is especially relevant to combating infectious diseases. He used experimental evolution to precisely test theories in evolutionary biology.

== Education and career ==
Dykhuizen graduated from Stanford University in 1965 with a BS in mathematics and from the University of Chicago in 1971 with a PhD under Richard Lewontin. He worked with Allen Campbell at Stanford as a postdoctoral fellow, before moving to Canberra, Australia as a research fellow from 1972 to 1976 in the Genetics Department at Australian National University. He returned to the United States as a postdoctoral fellow with Daniel Hartl at Purdue University and then moved with Hartl to Washington University in St. Louis. In 1987 he took a faculty position at Stony Brook University, where he rose from an assistant professor to a distinguished professor before he retired.

== Research ==
Dykhuizen has published over 100 reviewed articles and book chapters with over 10,000 citations. He plans to publish a book with Tony Dean called “Experimental Evolution: the making of a field”, at the end of 2025. He was the editor in chief of the Quarterly Review of Biology from 2010 to 2021.

Examples of Dykhuizen's most notable research accomplishments include using chemostats to study natural selection; testing the energy conservation theory of Lwoff using mutations of the genes used to synthesis tryptophan; showing lateral gene transfer happens between strains of Escherichia coli; estimating that there are millions of species of bacteria; developing the metabolic flux theory of fitness with Tony Dean and Dan Hartl; (7) showing selection against wasteful synthesis of proteins depended upon use of process rather than resource; showing that the Eastern Coyote is a mixture of Western Coyote, wolf and dog; and discussing problems in public health.

== Awards and honors ==
- Fellow of American Association for the Advancement of Science, 1988
- Fellow, American Academy of Microbiology, 2001
- Distinguished Professor, Stony Brook University, 2009
