= Bonnie Loch-Woodsetter North, Florida =

Bonnie Loch-Woodsetter North is a former census-designated place (CDP) in Broward County, Florida, United States. The population was 4,275 at the 2000 census. According to the U.S. Census errata, the area was misspelled as "Bonnie Lock-Woodsetter North".

The area was part of the Pompano Beach Highlands census area in the 1990 census.

== Geography ==
Bonnie Loch-Woodsetter North is located at 26°16′56″N 80°07′47″W.

According to the United States Census Bureau, the CDP has a total area of 1.2 km^{2} (0.46 sq mi), all land.

== Demographics ==
Bonnie Loch-Woodsetter North first appeared as a census designated place in the 2000 U.S. census created from part of Pompano Beach Highlands CDP. It was annexed to the city of Deerfield Beach prior to the 2010 U.S. census.

=== 2000 census ===
As of the census of 2000, there were 4,275 people, 1,271 households, and 990 families residing in the CDP. The population density was 3,438.7 people/km^{2} (8,906 people/mi^{2}). There were 1,359 housing units at an average density of 1,093.2 units/km^{2} (2,831 units/mi^{2}). The racial makeup of the CDP was 47.91% White (37.6% were Non-Hispanic White,) 31.16% African American, 0.42% Native American, 2.64% Asian, 0.05% Pacific Islander, 8.23% from other races, and 9.59% from two or more races. Hispanic or Latino of any race were 17.10% of the population.

There were 1,271 households, out of which 46.8% had children under the age of 18 living with them, 49.9% were married couples living together, 18.7% had a female householder with no husband present, and 22.1% were non-families. 13.1% of all households were made up of individuals, and 3.1% had someone living alone who was 65 years of age or older. The average household size was 3.30 and the average family size was 3.55.

In the CDP, the population was spread out, with 30.0% under the age of 18, 11.2% from 18 to 24, 34.6% from 25 to 44, 17.5% from 45 to 64, and 6.7% who were 65 years of age or older. The median age was 31 years. For every 100 females, there were 101.7 males. For every 100 females age 18 and over, there were 102.4 males.

The median income for a household in the CDP was $40,019, and the median income for a family was $40,433. Males had a median income of $27,708 versus $25,393 for females. The per capita income for the CDP was $15,024. About 10.9% of families and 10.7% of the population were below the poverty line, including 14.5% of those under age 18 and 19.4% of those age 65 or over.

As of 2000, English as a first language accounted for 55.46% of all residents, while French Creole accounted for 20.15%, Spanish was at 17.12%, and Portuguese as a mother tongue made up 7.24% of the population.
