= Vilayna LaSalle =

American model

Vilayna Lasalle
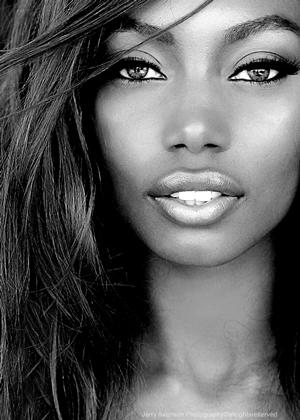
- Modeling information
- Height: 5 ft 8 in (1.73 m)
- Hair color: Brown
- Eye color: Gray

Vilayna Lasalle is an American model.

== Biography ==
LaSalle is of African-American, Brazilian and French background. She was raised in Texas with her being the youngest in a family of five. She moved to California to pursue her acting, modeling and singing ambitions. She placed 2nd in her very first contest for 'Elite Look of the Year' regionals at age 16. She appeared in print advertisements in countries like Japan and on various swimsuit calendars.

In 2006, she played in the Lingerie Bowl as offensive guard for the New York Euphoria team which won the 2006 competition.

Vilayna Lasalle appeared also in several other television shows including the reality game show Casting Ripe Live and E! Entertainments Wild On!. She took part as Ms. June in the 2004 documentary MO Girls: Behind the Scenes - The Making of 'Sports Zone'

In 2007, she played in the short drama Positive as well as in the comedy Epic Movie and the film Meet the Spartans both by directors Aaron Seltzer and Jason Friedberg.

She took part in several music videos. This includes the videos of Conteo by Don Omar, Hot in Herre by Nelly, Yummy by Chelo, Pretend by Nate James, Give it to me by Mobb Deep and Hot Stuff by Craig David.
