= Naza (artist) =

Brazilian artist (born 1955)

Maria Nazareth Maia Rufino McFarren
- Naza in her studio surrounded by paintings (2026)
- Born: 19 April 1955 (age 71); Santa Cruz do Piauí, Brazil
- Known for: Painting
- Style: Abstract figurative
- Children: Guiomar Rufino Lins e Silva, Daniel McFarren
- Website: www.naza.com

Maria Nazareth Maia Rufino McFarren (born 19 April 1955), better known as Naza, is a Brazilian American visual artist. She is best known for her Abstracted Realism paintings depicting human figures and wildlife, particularly endangered species.

== Biography ==
=== Early life and career beginnings (1955–1984) ===
Naza was born in Santa Cruz do Piauí and completed her primary education there before attending high school in Fortaleza. She began university studies in Teresina and, in 1976, relocated to Brasília, where she began painting professionally. Later that year, she moved to Recife, where she lived for five years, held her first solo exhibition, and began refining her signature style. Her daughter, Guiomar Rufino Lins e Silva, was born in Recife in 1979.

In 1982, Naza joined the Banco do Brasil and was stationed in Picos. During this period, she traveled frequently across Fortaleza, Recife, São Paulo, and Rio de Janeiro to present exhibitions and fulfill portrait commissions. While living in Picos, she met Stuart McFarren, an American; the couple married and relocated to the United States in 1985, living first in Saint Thomas and subsequently in Dalton, Ohio.

=== International travels and United States career (1985–present) ===
Between 1985 and 1988, Naza lived at Fort Kobbe, a U.S. military base in Panama, where she painted portraits for local society figures, including General Manuel Noriega and his family. In 1987, her son, Daniel McFarren, was born at Gorgas Hospital.

In 1988, she relocated to Arlington, Virginia. Her experimental work during this period culminated in the painting Losing the Fear of Red, which marked a major turning point in her artistic direction. Following a brief residency in Barbados in 1990, she moved with her children to Fayetteville, North Carolina. Over the next three years, she worked as a professional artist, taught Portuguese to U.S. Army personnel, and taught art at Fayetteville Technical Community College.

In 1993, Naza established the Naza Art Studio on Palmetto Park Road in Boca Raton, Florida.

In 2025, her art was exhibited at Fort Lauderdale Airport.
