= Loch Lomond, Pompano Beach, Florida =

Loch Lomond, Florida
- neighborhood
- Interactive map of Loch Lomond, Florida
- Coordinates: 26°16′19″N 80°7′47″W
- Country: United States
- State: Florida
- County: Broward

Area
  - Total: 0.23 sq mi (0.6 km^{2})
  - Land: 0.23 sq mi (0.6 km^{2})
  - Water: 0 sq mi (0.0 km^{2})

Population (2000)
  - Total: 3,537
  - Density: 15,711/sq mi (6,066.1/km^{2})
- Time zone: UTC-5 (Eastern (EST))
  - Summer (DST): UTC-4 (EDT)
- FIPS code: 12-40970

Loch Lomond is a former census-designated place (CDP) in Broward County, Florida, United States. The population was 3,537 at the 2000 census. It now serves as a Pompano Beach neighborhood.

== Geography ==
Loch Lomond is located at 26°16′19″N 80°7′47″W (26.272058, -80.129665).

According to the United States Census Bureau, the CDP has a total area of 0.6 km^{2} (0.23 sq mi), all land.

== Demographics ==
As of the census of 2000, there were 3,537 people, 1,399 households, and 790 families residing in the CDP. The population density was 5,937.6 people/km^{2} (15,378 people/mi^{2}). There were 1,559 housing units at an average density of 2,617.1 units/km^{2} (6,778 units/mi^{2}). The racial makeup of the CDP was 43.51% White (29.7% were Non-Hispanic White,) 30.36% African American, 0.51% Native American, 1.61% Asian, 0.23% Pacific Islander, 10.09% from other races, and 13.68% from two or more races. Hispanic or Latino of any race were 24.63% of the population.

There were 1,399 households, out of which 34.0% had children under the age of 18 living with them, 30.0% were married couples living together, 17.5% had a female householder with no husband present, and 43.5% were non-families. 28.9% of all households were made up of individuals, and 4.9% had someone living alone who was 65 years of age or older. The average household size was 2.53 and the average family size was 3.09.

In the CDP, the population was spread out, with 23.6% under the age of 18, 13.6% from 18 to 24, 44.2% from 25 to 44, 14.1% from 45 to 64, and 4.4% who were 65 years of age or older. The median age was 30 years. For every 100 females, there were 120.0 males. For every 100 females age 18 and over, there were 125.6 males.

The median income for a household in the CDP was $23,646, and the median income for a family was $23,365. Males had a median income of $21,660 versus $16,202 for females. The per capita income for the CDP was $11,862. About 28.6% of families and 30.7% of the population were below the poverty line, including 44.6% of those under age 18 and 3.6% of those age 65 or over.

As of 2000, English as a first language accounted for 32.49% of all residents, while Spanish accounted for 28.79%, French Creole made up 20.22%, Portuguese was at 17.11%, and French was the mother tongue of 1.38% of the population.
