= Santa Cruz do Piauí =

Coordinates: 7°09′S 41°48′W

- Municipality
- Country: Brazil
- Region: Nordeste
- State: Piauí
- Mesoregion: Sudeste Piauiense

Population (2020)
  - Total: 6,247
- Time zone: UTC−3 (BRT)

Santa Cruz do Piauí is a municipality in the state of Piauí in the Northeast region of Brazil.

== See also ==
- List of municipalities in Piauí
