= Paul E. Turner =

American evolutionary biologist

- Education: University of Rochester (BA); Michigan State University (PhD)
- Scientific career
- Fields: Evolutionary Biology, Virology
- Workplaces: Yale University; Yale School of Medicine
- Thesis: Bacteria and conjugative plasmids: model systems for testing evolutionary theory (1995)
- Doctoral advisor: Richard Lenski

Paul Eugene Turner is an American evolutionary biologist and virologist, the Rachel Carson Professor of ecology and evolutionary biology at Yale University, and a faculty member in microbiology at the Yale School of Medicine. His research focuses on the evolutionary genetics of viruses, particularly bacteriophages and RNA viruses transmitted by mosquitoes. In 2025, he was elected to the American Philosophical Society.

== Early life ==
Paul Turner was born in Philadelphia, Pennsylvania in 1966 to Eugene Turner, a Presbyterian minister, and Sylvia Turner, a public schoolteacher. Turner grew up outside of Syracuse, New York, where he spent his childhood among forests and lakes, observing animals in their natural habitats.

Although he entered college at the University of Rochester intending to become an engineer, Turner was encouraged by professors like John Jaenike and Andrew Dobson to pursue graduate work in biology. Despite graduating with a B.A. in Biology in 1988, Turner was still unsure about entering graduate school. At the time, no African American had yet earned a PhD in evolutionary biology. He therefore took a four-month internship at a National Audubon Society wildlife sanctuary in Monson, Maine after graduating. During the internship, Turner convinced himself to apply to graduate programs.

== Scientific career ==
Turner began his graduate studies in the program of Ecology and Evolutionary Biology at the University of California, Irvine in 1989, working with Richard E. Lenski as his PhD advisor. When Lenski’s research group transferred to Michigan State University in 1991, Turner moved with the group and completed his PhD in Zoology (with a certificate from the Ecology, Evolution, and Behavior (EEB) Program) there in 1995. In doing so, Turner became only the fifth African American to receive a PhD in evolutionary biology. During his time in Lenski’s group, Turner studied bacterial systems to address fundamental questions at the interface of ecology and evolution, such as the trade-off between horizontal and vertical transmission in parasites.

Following his graduate studies, Turner completed postdoctoral fellowships at the University of Maryland, College Park, the University of Valencia, and the National Institutes of Health. In 2001, he was appointed as an assistant professor in the Department of Ecology and Evolutionary Biology at Yale University. He was promoted to associate professor in 2006 and full professor in 2011. Turner was a Whitman Center scientist at the Marine Biological Laboratory from 2011 to 2015, where he also served on the faculty of the Molecular Evolution workshop and the Microbial Diversity course.

Turner has co-authored over 150 publications that have together been cited over 6,000 times. Although Turner is known for his foundational work in viral evolution, he has recently begun to apply his insights towards advancing the development of phage therapy against antibiotic-resistant bacterial infections.

== Awards and recognition ==
- Elected member of the National Academy of Sciences (2019)
- Elected fellow of the American Academy of Arts and Sciences (2019)
