= Marcelo Coelho =

Brazilian computation artist and designer

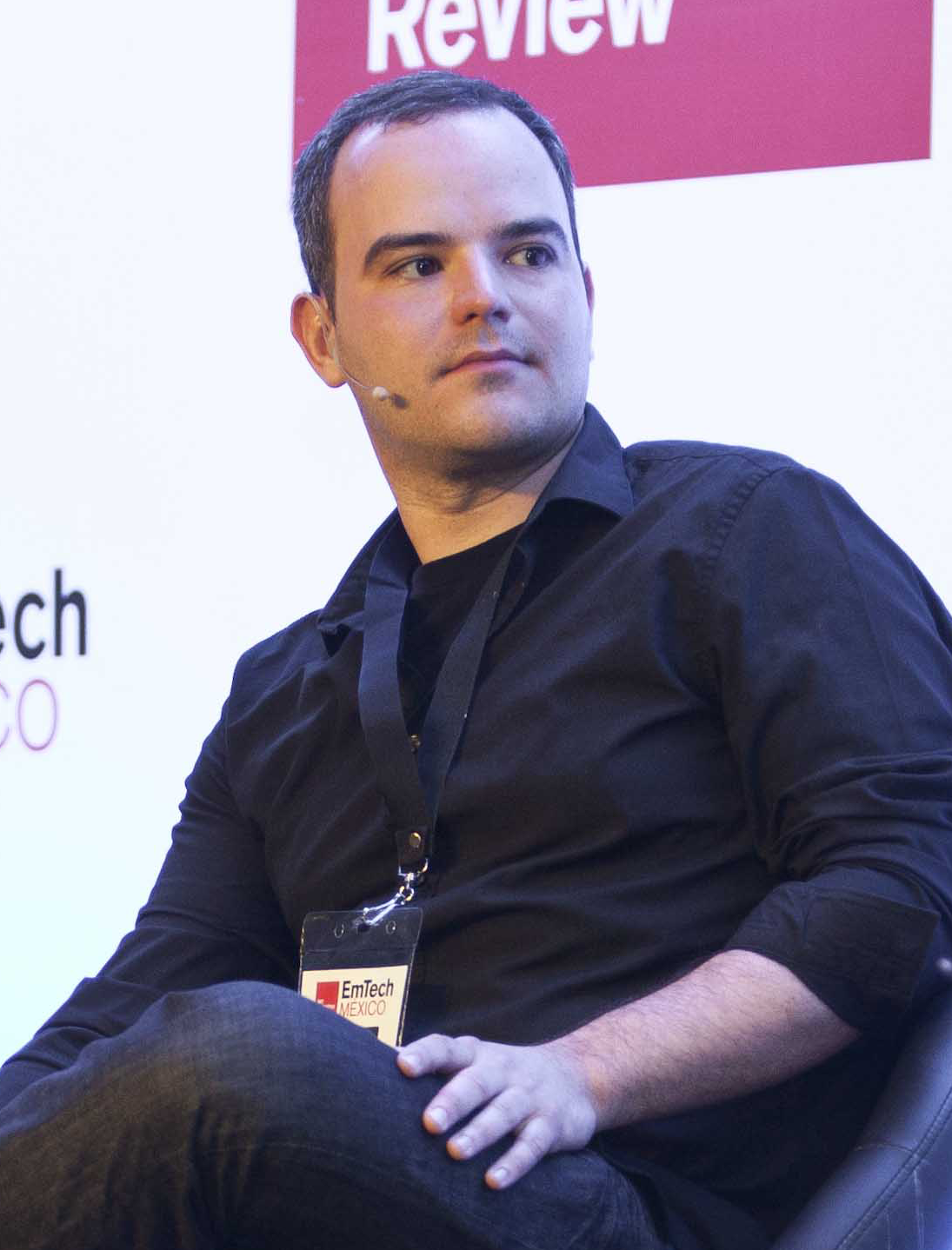
- Education: University of São Paulo; Concordia University; Massachusetts Institute of Technology
- Known for: digital art wearables

Marcelo Coelho is a Brazilian American computation artist and designer. His work focuses on the boundaries between matter and computation, and includes interactive installations, photography, wearables, and robotics. Coelho is currently an Associate Professor of the Practice at the MIT School of Architecture and Planning and Director at MIT's Design Intelligence Lab, a research lab inventing new forms of expression and collaboration between human and machine intelligence.

Marcelo Coelho graduated from Concordia University with a Bachelor of Fine Arts in Design and Computation Arts, and received a Master of Science and Doctor of Philosophy from the MIT Media Lab.

== Works ==
Coelho makes objects, installations, and live experiences that challenges people's perception of material properties and behaviors. Many of his works use techniques and concepts from composites, digital fabrication and programmable matter.

Large Language Objects (LLO) are physical interfaces that embed large language models into real-world objects with applications in music, storytelling, play and communication.

Six-Forty by Four-Eighty, a 2010 installation by Coelho, uses interactive physical pixels and body communication to convey an immersive digital graffiti experience.

For the 2016 Summer Paralympics opening ceremony, Coelho created an audiovisual performance of 400 dancers equipped with illuminated walking sticks to form a large-scale 2.5-dimensional display.

In Sandcastles, Coelho collaborated with artist Vik Muniz to etch drawings of castles originally created with a camera lucida onto grains of sand, using a focused ion beam and scanning electron microscope.

In Hyperform, Coelho developed a chandelier that is assembled from a single 3D printed chain, and where the assembly information is encoded in the material itself.

== Awards and Exhibits ==
Coelho's work has been exhibited at Ars Electronica in Linz, Austria, the Tel Aviv Museum of Art, the Corcoran Gallery of Art in Washington, D.C., Design Miami in Basel, Switzerland, and the Waddesdon Manor in Buckinghamshire, England.

Coelho's work has won awards including the Vida 16 award from Fundacion Telefónica, the Designer of the Future Award from Design Miami, an Honorary Mention for Interactive Art and [the next idea] voestalpine Art and Technology Grant from Ars Electronica.
