= Greater =

Greater may refer to:

- Greatness, the state of being great
- Greater than, in inequality
- Greater (film), a 2016 American film
- Greater (flamingo), the oldest flamingo on record
- "Greater" (song), by MercyMe, 2014
- Greater Bank, an Australian bank
- Greater Media, an American media company

== See also ==
- Irredentism usually named as Greater Nation. Examples include Greater Finland, Greater Romania
