= James J. Bull =

American biologist

- Education: University of Utah
- Children: 2; Robert Bull (son), Martha Bull (daughter)
- Scientific career
- Fields: Molecular Biology, experimental evolution, Phylogenetics
- Workplaces: University of Texas at Austin, University of Idaho
- Thesis: Evolution in Karyotypes : I. Sex Determination, and II. Chromosomes of Side Necked Turtles (1977)
- Doctoral advisor: John Legler

James Jeffrey Bull is a professor of biology at the University of Idaho and also Joseph J. and Jeanne M. Lagowski Regents Professor (Emeritus) in Molecular Biology at the University of Texas at Austin. He is best known for his influential 1983 monograph, Evolution of Sex Determining Mechanisms.

In the early 1990s, he changed the focus of his work to experimental evolution and phylogenetics, and has since had considerable success in both fields. His work in experimental evolution involves observing genetic and phenotypic changes in bacteria and bacteriophages, the viruses that attack bacteria.

In 2003 he was elected a member of the American Academy of Arts and Sciences. In 2016 he was elected to the National Academy of Sciences.

After becoming emeritus at UT Austin, Bull moved to the University of Idaho in 2019.

== Bibliography ==
- Evolution of sex determining mechanisms. 1983. Menlo Park, California: The Benjamin/Cummings Publishing Company, Inc. ISBN 0-8053-0400-2
