= Gabriella Burnham =

Brazilian-American lawyer

Gabriella Burnham is a Brazilian-American novelist.

She graduated from Trinity College and St. Joseph's College. Her work has appeared in Harper's Bazaar.

== Works ==
- It Is Wood, It Is Stone, 2020.
- Wait, 2024.
