= Ana Maria Carvalho =

Brazilian professor

Ana Maria Carvalho is a Brazilian sociolinguist and a professor of linguistics within the Department of Spanish and Portuguese at the University of Arizona. She is the author of several books and articles on sociolinguistics and language acquisition.

== Career ==
Carvalho holds a PhD in Hispanic Linguistics from the University of California at Berkeley. Currently, she holds the title of Professor in the Department of Spanish and Portuguese at the University of Arizona and is also a member of the faculty of the Second Language Acquisition and Teaching (SLAT) Program and the Center for Latin American Studies. Her research interests include language change and variation, bilingualism, language contact, language attitude, and dialect and language acquisition. Much of her work has explored the relationship between Portuguese and Spanish as it relates to both language acquisition and sociolinguistics, the latter marked by her contributions to the study of Portuñol.

== Bibliography ==
=== Books ===
- Simões, Antônio R.M.; Ana Maria Carvalho; Lyris Wiedemann (2004). Português para falantes de espanhol: Artigos selecionados escritos em português e inglês. Campinas, Spain: Pontes. ISBN 978-85-7113-201-6.
- Carvalho, Ana Maria (2006). "On the differences between Spanish and Portuguese". In R. Rickerson; B. Hilton (eds.). The 5 minute linguist: Bite-sized essays on language and languages. London: Equinox. pp. 228–231. ISBN 978-1-84553-199-7.
- Carvalho, Ana Maria (2007). "Diagnóstico sociolingüístico de comunidades escolares fronterizas en el norte de Uruguay". In N. Brian; C. Brovetto; J. Geymonat (eds.). Portugués del Uruguay y educación bilingüe. Montevideo: Administración Nacional de Educación Pública. pp. 44–96.

=== Articles ===
- Carvalho, Ana Maria (2002). "Português para falantes de espanhol: Perspectivas de um campo de pesquisa". Hispania. 85 (3). American Association of Teachers of Spanish and Portuguese: 597–608. doi:10.2307/4141149. JSTOR 4141149.
- Carvalho, Ana Maria (2003). "Rumo a uma definição do português uruguaio". Revista internacional de lingüística iberoamericana. 2: 125–150. ISSN 1579-9425.
- Carvalho, Ana Maria (2003). "The sociolinguistic distribution of (lh) in Uruguayan Portuguese: a case of dialect diffusion". In S. Montrul; F. Ordóñez (eds.). Linguistic theory and language development in Hispanic linguistics: selected papers on Hispanic linguistics. Cascadilla Press. pp. 30–44.
- Carvalho, Ana Maria (2003). "Variation and diffusion of Uruguayan Portuguese in a bilingual border town". In R. Yáñez; A.L. Suárez (eds.). Comunidades e individuos bilingües. Actas do I Simposio Internacional sobre o Bilingüismo. Vigo: Universidade. pp. 642–651.
- Carvalho, Ana Maria (2004). "Diagnóstico sociolingüístico de comunidades escolares fronterizas en el norte de Uruguay" (PDF). Portuguese Language Journal. 3. Archived from the original (PDF) on 2010-06-03.
- Carvalho, Ana Maria (2004). "I speak like the guys on TV: Palatalization and the urbanization of Uruguayan Portuguese". Language Variation and Change. 16 (2): 127–151. doi:10.1017/S0954394504162030. S2CID 144351313.
- Carvalho, Ana Maria (2006). "Nominal number marking in a variety of Spanish in contact with Portuguese" (PDF). In T.L. Face; C.A. Klee (eds.). Selected Proceedings of the 8th Hispanic Linguistics Symposium. Somerville, MA: Cascadilla Proceedings Project. pp. 154–166.
- Carvalho, Ana Maria (2006). "Políticas lingüísticas de séculos passados nos dias de hoje: O dilema sobre a educação bilingüe no norte do Uruguai". Language Problems & Language Planning. 30 (2): 149–171. doi:10.1075/lplp.30.2.04car. ISSN 0272-2690.
- Carvalho, Ana Maria (2008). "Estudo de atitudes lingüísticas sobre o português de hispano-falantes: Até que ponto o portunhol é aceitável?". In L. Weidemann; M. Scaramucci (eds.). Selected Papers of the II Symposium of Portuguese for Spanish Speakers. Campinas: Pontes Editorial. pp. 157–173.
- Carvalho, Ana Maria (2006). "Spanish (s) aspiration as a prestige marker on the Uruguayan-Brazilian border". Spanish in Context. 3 (1): 85–114. doi:10.1075/sic.3.1.07car. ISSN 1571-0718.
- Carvalho, Ana Maria; Antônio J.B. da Silva (2006). "Cross-linguistic influence in third language acquisition: The case of Spanish-speaking learners of Portuguese". Foreign Language Annals. 39 (2): 187–204. doi:10.1111/j.1944-9720.2006.tb02261.x.
- Carvalho, Ana Maria; Antônio J.B. da Silva (2008). "O papel do conhecimento metalingüístico nos padrões de transferência no desenvolvimento da interlíngua e suas implicações pedagógicas" (PDF). Portuguese Language Journal. 3. Archived from the original (PDF) on 2010-06-03.

== Awards and honors ==
- Executive Council. American Association of Teachers of Spanish and Portuguese (AATSP). 2003-2005.
- University of Arizona College of Humanities Distinguished Advising and Mentoring Award. Spring 2002.
