= Flavia Colgan =

Brazilian-American political strategist (born 1977)

Flavia Monteiro Colgan (Portuguese pronunciation: [ˈflavjɐ mõˈtejɾu ˈkowɡɐ̃], born October 18, 1977) is a Brazilian-American Democratic strategist who is an active political contributor on MSNBC and serves as a special correspondent for Extra. She resides in Los Angeles.

== Family ==
The Colemans moved from Philadelphia to Detroit. Later, Coleman would become General Counsel to the United States Army when his law school roommate, Bill Clinton, was elected president. She is the step-niece of both Lovida Coleman Jr., a former Justice Department lawyer and Deputy Independent council who currently serves on the board of RAND, and Hardin Coleman.

Colgan's father taught in the School District of Philadelphia. Every weekend she flew from Detroit to Philadelphia to be with him. At age 11, Colgan's mother moved to the Dominican Republic where they lived in Santo Domingo.

Returning to Detroit when she was 13, she attended four different high schools. She spent her sophomore high school year in Fairfield, Iowa. Colgan returned to school in Michigan for her junior year at The Roeper School and completed high school at The Shipley School, a private school in Bryn Mawr, Pennsylvania.

Admitted to Harvard, she graduated with honors in 1999, earning a degree in Comparative Religion. She returned to Philadelphia, interning under federal Judge Louis Pollak.

Prior to joining MSNBC and Fox News, Colgan was a Democratic Party fundraiser and political consultant. Later she served as campaign manager for both David Wecht for Pennsylvania's Superior Court, and Catherine Baker Knoll for state treasurer. She was the first ever woman and youngest Chief of Staff to Pennsylvania's Lt. Governor and served on Governor Ed Rendell's Senior Staff.

In 2002, she was named to the PoliticsPA list of "Rising Stars" in Pennsylvania politics.

== Writing ==
Flavia Colgan is an editorial board member and columnist for the Philadelphia Daily News and a regular contributor to The Huffington Post, Politics PA and The Morning Call of Allentown, Pennsylvania. Her work has also appeared in In These Times, Common Dreams, and The Patriot-News of Harrisburg, Pennsylvania.

== Websites ==
In late March 2006, in conjunction with the Philadelphia Daily News, Colgan launched Citizen Hunter, a website about social, political and community action.
