= Allan M. Campbell =

American biochemist

- Born: April 27, 1929
- Died: April 19, 2018 (aged 88)
- Education: University of California, Berkeley, University of Illinois
- Known for: Pioneering work on Lambda phage
- Spouse: Alice del Campillo Campbell
- Scientific career
- Fields: Microbiology, Genetics
- Workplaces: University of Rochester, Stanford University
- Doctoral advisor: Sol Spiegelman

Allan McCulloch Campbell (April 27, 1929 – April 19, 2018) was an American microbiologist and geneticist and the Barbara Kimball Browning Professor Emeritus in the Department of Biology at Stanford University. His pioneering work on Lambda phage helped to advance molecular biology in the late 20th century. An important collaborator and member of his laboratory at Stanford University was biochemist Alice del Campillo Campbell, his wife.

== Education ==
Campbell earned his bachelor's degree at the University of California, Berkeley (1950) and master's (1951) and doctoral (1953) degrees from the University of Illinois where he worked with Sol Spiegelman.

== Career ==
From 1953-1957 Campbell was on the faculty of the University of Michigan. During the summers he spent time with Gio ("Joe") Bertani at Caltech and the University of Southern California, at Cold Spring Harbor Laboratory and at the Institut Pasteur with François Jacob.

In 1958 he married Alice del Campillo, a Ph.D. student in biochemistry at the University of Michigan. They spent the year after their marriage working in Paris. The two worked closely together throughout their careers, investigating research questions such as the encoding of heat-sensitive endolysin and the biosynthesis and regulation of biotin.

Campbell spent the next nine years on the faculty of the University of Rochester, where he made significant discoveries about lambda phage.

In 1968 Campbell joined the Department of Biology at Stanford University, where he led his own laboratory. He was appointed to the Barbara Kimball Browning endowed chair in 1992.

Campbell was the editor of the Annual Review of Genetics from 1985 to 2012.

== Research ==
Campbell's research has concentrated on the genetics of bacteria and their viruses, especially the integration of viral DNA into host chromosomes. His most prominent discovery was the proposal of the "Campbell model" of virus insertion, where viral DNA is inserted into the host chromosome, becoming covalently bonded to the bacterial DNA, and then remains dormant until activation. Campbell's research was focused on a specific bacterial virus, phage lambda, and its host bacterium E. coli, but the model provided insights into how extrachromosomal DNA can be inserted and excised in other organisms.

This model was proposed in the book Episomes published in 1968, the first comprehensive treatment of plasmid biology. It was described as "a wide-ranging and critical evaluation of the experimental foundation of the episome concept".

While study of the regulation of integration and excision of phage lambda in E coli has been a primary focus of his research, Campbell and research associates also studied regulation and expression of E coli genes linked to the lambda insertion location, including the biotin (bio) and galactose (gal) genes.

== Background on phage lambda and lysogeny ==
Early studies on bacterial viruses began after the discovery by Twort and d'Herelle of 'filterable agents' which were able to destroy bacteria. These were demonstrated by creating a lawn of bacteria on appropriate media, mixing with these 'filterable agents' and then observing areas of destroyed cells seen as cleared circular areas (plaques) on the lawn. These plaques were interpreted as the result of a single agent infecting a bacterial cell, reproducing in the cell and then bursting open to infect surrounding cells, repeating the process until a clear circular area of destroyed cells becomes visible to the unaided eye. These filterable agents were named bacteriophages (eaters of bacteria) or phage for short.

The 1940s produced the first pictures of bacterial viruses using electron microscopy produced the first photos of bacterial viruses, and research on the mechanism of infection and reproduction dramatically increased. One of the focal points of this research was Cold Spring Harbor Laboratory on Long Island, where a 'phage group' led by Salvador Luria, Max Delbrück, Alfred Hershey and others met in the summers for research and training of new investigators.

In 1951 Esther Lederberg discovered lambda phage, which had an unusual characteristic. While lambda could infect and reproduce in some strains of its host bacterium E. coli, other strains seemed immune to infection. However, when the immune strains were mixed with non-immune strains, occasionally lambda phage could be observed infecting the non-immune strains. Further research suggested that the immune strains contained a dormant copy of the lambda genome which protected it from infection, but that dormant copy could be activated into the active viral state to begin a new round of infection. This dormant phase was called the 'lysogenic' state and the actively infectious state was called the 'lytic' state. The dormant form of the lambda genome was called the 'prophage'.

Study of phage lambda over the next 50 years provided valuable insights into virus life cycles, the regulation and expression of genetic material, and the mechanism of integration and excision of genetic material into chromosomal locations.

Allan Campbell's contribution to the field with the 'Campbell model' of integration and excision marked a major step forward in the understanding of this process.

== Honors ==
Campbell was an elected member of the National Academy of Sciences (1971), the American Academy of Arts and Sciences (1971), the American Association for the Advancement of Science (1983) and a fellow of the American Academy of Microbiology.

Campbell received the 2004 Abbott-ASM Lifetime Achievement Award from the American Society for Microbiology at the society's 104th general meeting in New Orleans on Monday, May 24, 2004. Campbell delivered the Abbott-ASM Award Lecture and was honored at a dinner ceremony that evening. The award includes a $20,000 cash prize and a commemorative piece.

In honoring Campbell, ASM officials cited his "exceptional insights and achievements in the field of molecular genetics - a career of groundbreaking research that has had a profound influence on several fields, including molecular cloning and gene therapy."

== Selected publications ==
- Campbell, Allan M. (1963). "Episomes". In Caspari, E.W.; Thoday, J.M. (eds.). Advances in Genetics. Vol. 11. New York, N.Y.: Academic Press. pp. 101–145. ISBN 978-0-12-017611-3.
- Campbell, A.; Berg, D.; Botstein, D.; Lederberg, E.M.; Novick, R.P.; Starlinger, P.; Szybalski, W. (1977). "Nomenclature of transposable elements in prokaryotes". DNA insertion elements, plasmids, and episomes. [Cold Spring Harbor, N.Y.]: Cold Spring Harbor Laboratory. pp. 15–22. ISBN 978-0-87969-118-9.
- Campbell, A.; Berg, D.; Botstein, D.; Lederberg, E.M.; Novick, R.P.; Starlinger, P.; Szybalski, W. (March 1979). "Nomenclature of transposable elements in prokaryotes". Gene. 5 (3): 197–206. doi:10.1016/0378-1119(79)90078-7. PMID 467979.
- Campbell, A.; Starlinger, P.; Berg, D.; Botstein, D.; Lederberg, E.M.; Novick, R.P.; Szybalski, W. (July 1979). "Nomenclature of transposable elements in prokaryotes" (PDF). Plasmid. 2 (3): 466–473. doi:10.1016/0147-619X(79)90030-1. PMID 384423.
- Campbell, Allan (December 2007). "Phage Integration and Chromosome Structure. A Personal History". Annual Review of Genetics. 41 (1): 1–11. doi:10.1146/annurev.genet.41.110306.130240. PMID 17474874. (Note: After Esther Lederberg's death in November 2006, Campbell published "Phage Integration and Chromosome Structure. A Personal History" with the following dedication: "This chapter is dedicated to the memory of Esther M. Lederberg (1922-2006) whose early work laid some of the ground for the author's research described herein.")
