= Lin Chao =

Lin Chao is a Chinese Brazilian–American evolutionary biologist and geneticist. He earned his PhD in 1977 from the University of Massachusetts Amherst, as a student of Bruce R. Levin (now at Emory University), and was a NIH postdoctoral fellow at Princeton University in the laboratory of Edward C. Cox. He spent most of his career in the Department of Biology of the University of Maryland, College Park and is currently at the Ecology, Behavior and Evolution Section of the University of California, San Diego.

Chao is best known for his early work on the evolution of bacteriocins, his demonstration of Muller’s ratchet in the RNA Virus Phi-6 and his work on sex in viruses. More recently, he was instrumental in the demonstration of the evolution of parasitic genetic elements in co-infecting bacteriophages and experimental tests of Fisher's geometric model. He argued that "life is evolution by natural selection". The approach generally used in his laboratory is called microbial experimental evolution.

Chao is married to Camilla Rang, a fellow scientist, T-shirt designer and Swedish children's book author.

- UCSD Chancellor's Associates Faculty Excellence Award (2014)
