= List of U.S. communities with African-American majority populations in 2000 =

The following is a list of United States cities, towns and unincorporated areas (Census Designated Places) in which a majority (over 50%) of the population is non-Hispanic African American or Black alone, according to data from the 2000 Census. This list does not include cities such as Chicago, Illinois or Philadelphia, Pennsylvania in which, according to the 2000 Census, merely a plurality (as opposed to a majority) of the residents are African American. The list below is organized by state and, within each state, by population size. The percentage of each city's population that is African American is listed in parentheses next to the city's name.

== Alabama ==
Population over 200,000

- Birmingham (2000, 73.19%)

Population 25,000 to 50,000

- Bessemer (2000, 69.25%)
- Prichard (2000, 84.15%)

Population 10,000 to 24,999

- Fairfield (2000, 89.91%)
- Selma (2000, 69.43%)
- Tuskegee (2000, 95.03%)

Population 5,000 to 9,999

- Demopolis (2000, 50.58%)★
- Lanett (2000, 53.35%)
- Midfield (2000, 59.47%)

Population 1,000 to 4,999

- Aliceville (2000, 66.34%)
- Brighton (2000, 88.74%)
- Brundidge (2000, 66.34%)
- Camden (2000, 53.92%)
- Camp Hill (2000, 84.45%)
- Clayton (2000, 63.05%)
- Clio (2000, 56.75%)★
- Eutaw (2000, 63.05%)
- Evergreen (2000, 52.40%)
- Fort Deposit (2000, 67.95%)
- Georgiana (2000, 61.60%)
- Goodwater (2000, 73.12%)
- Greensboro (2000, 60.27%)
- Hayneville (85.5%)
- La Fayette (67.3%)
- Lipscomb (2000, 65.58%)
- Livingston (60.8%)
- Marion (62.5%)
- Mosses (2000, 97.37%)
- Selmont-West Selmont CDP (2000, 90.69%)
- Union Springs (74.4%)
- White Hall (98.0%)
- York (78.3%)

Population 100 to 999

- Akron (2000, 80.42%)
- Autaugaville (66.0%)
- Beatrice (72.6%)
- Boligee (88.9%)
- Colony (93.5%)
- Edgewater CDP (60.00%)
- Epes (84.0%)
- Five Points (52.1%)
- Forkland (89.2%)
- Franklin (56.4%)
- Geiger (70.2%)
- Gordon (74.0%)
- Gordonville (95.9%)
- Hillsboro (82.2%)
- Hobson City (92.7%)
- Hurtsboro (70.3%)
- Lisman (91.4%)
- Loachapoka (2000, 60.61%)★
- Macedonia (2000, 91.75%)
- Midway (88.8%)
- Mount Vernon (2000, 52.96%)
- Pickensville (63.0%)
- Ridgeville (79.1%)
- Shorter (81.7%)
- Triana (86.5%)
- Union (92.1%)
- Uniontown (88.2%)
- Vredenburgh (89.0%)
- Yellow Bluff (92.8%)

Population under 100

- Dayton (65.0%)
- Emelle (93.6%)
- McMullen (2000, 100.00%)
- Memphis (97.0%)
- Newbern (77.1%)
- North Courtland (97.5%)
- Oak Hill (2000, 64.86%)★

★ No longer African-American majority as of the 2010 Census
★ No longer African-American majority as of the 2020 Census

== Arkansas ==
Population over 50,000

- Pine Bluff (2000, 65.59%)

Population 25,000 to 49,999

- West Memphis (2000, 55.77%)

Population 10,000 to 24,999

- Blytheville (56.0%)
- Forrest City (60.9%)

Population 5,000 to 9,999

- Osceola (2000, 50.66%)
- Dumas (60.0%)
- Helena (2000, 67.52%)★
- West Helena (2000, 65.38%)★

Population 1,000 to 4,999

- Altheimer (2000, 87.42%)
- Dermott (73.3%)
- Earle (2000, 74.93%)
- Edmondson (2000, 80.81%)
- Eudora (84.5%)
- Gould (78.0%)
- Hughes (67.8%)
- Lake Village (56.2%)
- Luxora (2000, 56.04%)
- Marianna (74.1%)
- Marvell (2000, 57.49%)
- McAlmont (70.5%)
- Parkin (68.5%)
- Stamps (54.5%)
- Sweet Home CDP (2000, 74.02%)
- Waldo (58.7%)
- Wrightsville (74.6%)

Population 100 to 999

- Allport (2000, 94.49%)
- Anthonyville (2000, 96.40%)
- Bluff City (2000, 71.52%)
- Bradley (2000, 51.69%)
- Carthage (2000, 82.13%)
- Chidester (2000, 62.39%)
- College Station CDP (2000, 91.38%)
- Cotton Plant (2000, 72.60%)
- Elaine (2000, 54.34%)
- Fredonia (2000, 58.19%)★
- Garland (2000, 69.32%)
- Gilmore (2000, 79.11%)
- Grady (2000, 65.39%)
- Gum Springs (2000, 55.15%)
- Harrell (2000, 56.31%)★
- Haynes (2000, 85.05%)
- Hensley (2000, 64.67%)
- Holly Grove (2000, 72.58%)
- Jennette (2000, 87.90%)
- Jericho (2000, 93.29%)
- LaGrange (2000, 56.56%)★
- Lake View (2000, 91.71%)
- Madison (2000, 88.96%)
- McNeil (2000, 56.95%)
- Menifee (2000, 84.57%)
- Mitchellville (2000, 97.99%)
- Montrose (2000, 71.67%)
- Parkdale (2000, 65.52%)
- Perla (2000, 63.48%)★
- Reed (2000, 96.00%)
- Rondo (2000, 70.04%)
- Rosston (2000, 57.74%)
- Strong (2000, 53.15%)
- Sunset (2000, 89.94%)
- Tollette (2000, 98.46%)
- Turrell (2000, 77.01%)
- Twin Groves (2000, 72.10%)
- Wabbaseka (2000, 84.21%)
- Washington (2000, 61.49%)★
- Widener (2000, 66.57%)
- Wilmar (2000, 71.80%)
- Wilmot (2000, 74.55%)
- Winchester (2000, 64.92%)
- Woodson (2000, 73.93%)

Population under 100

- Birdsong (2000, 100.00%)

★ No longer African-American majority as of the 2010 Census
★ No longer African-American majority as of the 2020 Census
★ Helena and West Helena merged in 2006 to form the city of Helena–West Helena

== California ==
Population 25,000 to 99,999

- Westmont CDP (2000, 57.22%)★

Population 10,000 to 24,999

- View Park-Windsor Hills CDP (2000, 87.21%)

Population 5,000 to 9,999

- Ladera Heights CDP (2000, 70.07%)
- West Athens CDP (2000, 55.48%)★
- West Rancho Dominguez CDP (2000, 61.40%)★

★ No longer African-American majority as of the 2010 Census
★ No longer African-American majority as of the 2020 Census

== Connecticut ==
Population 10,000 to 24,999

- Bloomfield (2000, 53.33%)

== Delaware ==
Population 25,000 to 99,999

- Wilmington (2000, 55.80%)

== District of Columbia ==
Population over 500,000

- Washington D.C. (2000, 59.45%)★

== Florida ==
Population over 50,000

- Lauderhill (2000, 57.92%)
- North Miami (2000, 53.04%)

Population 25,000 to 49,999

- Golden Glades CDP (2000, 63.36%)
- Lauderdale Lakes (2000, 67.00%)
- Pine Hills CDP (2000, 50.29%)
- Riviera Beach (2000, 67.15%)
- West Little River CDP (2000, 54.83%)★

Population 10,000 to 24,999

- Andover CDP (2000, 68.83%)★
- Belle Glade (2000, 50.12%)
- Brownsville CDP (2000, 90.14%)
- Florida City (2000, 55.77%)★
- Gladeview CDP (2000, 75.80%)
- Norland CDP (2000, 77.91%)★
- Opa-locka (2000, 66.44%)★
- Pinewood CDP (2000, 69.20%)
- Quincy (2000, 64.01%)
- Scott Lake CDP (2000, 89.69%)★

Population 5,000 to 9,999

- Lake Lucerne CDP (2000, 82.23%)★
- Fort Pierce North CDP (2000, 71.84%)
- Gifford CDP (2000, 56.95%)★
- Goulds CDP (2000, 76.83%)★
- Melrose Park CDP (2000, 82.04%)★
- Opa-locka North CDP (2000, 73.39%)★
- Pahokee (2000, 55.30%)
- Richmond Heights CDP (2000, 81.96%)
- South Apopka CDP (2000, 64.98%)
- West Perrine CDP (2000, 71.86%)★
- Westview CDP (2000, 73.50%)

Population 1,000 to 4,999

- Belle Glade Camp CDP (2000, 69.33%)★
- Boulevard Gardens CDP (2000, 93.64%)
- Broward Estates CDP (2000, 96.25%)★
- Bunche Park CDP (2000, 95.47%)★
- Carver Ranches CDP (2000, 95.98%)★
- Century (2000, 56.24%)
- Cypress Quarters CDP (2000, 65.83%)
- DeLand Southwest CDP (2000, 70.40%)
- East Dunbar CDP (2000, 91.52%)★
- Eatonville (2000, 88.45%)
- El Portal (2000, 59.16%)★
- Fremd Village-Padgett Island CDP (2000, 91.43%)★
- Goulding CDP (2000, 71.90%)
- Gretna (2000, 87.83%)
- Harlem CDP (2000, 94.76%)
- Havana (2000, 56.51%)
- Madison (2000, 61.94%)
- Mangonia Park (2000. 75.92%)
- Midway (Gadsden County) (2000, 94.12%)
- Midway CDP (Seminole County) (2000, 93.52%)
- Monticello (50.73%)★
- Naranja CDP (56.69%)★
- Pompano Estates CDP (2000, 52.57%)★
- Progress Village CDP (2000, 90.05%)★
- Ridgecrest CDP (2000, 80.07%)
- Rock Island CDP (2000, 96.23%)★
- Roosevelt Gardens CDP (2000, 97.56%)
- South Bay (2000, 66.26%)★
- St. George CDP (2000, 96.90%)
- Tangelo Park CDP (2000, 88.44%)
- Washington Park CDP (2000, 97.77%)
- West Ken-Lark CDP (2000, 96.57%)★

Population 100 to 999

- Campbellton (2000, 59.91%)
- Charleston Park CDP (2000, 82.00%)
- East Williston CDP (2000, 83.33%)
- Franklin Park CDP (2000, 96.61%)
- Golden Heights CDP (2000, 93.61%)★
- Greenville (2000, 72.04%)
- Jacob City (2000, 85.02%)
- Limestone Creek CDP (2000, 77.15%)★
- Tildenville CDP (2000, 80.31%)
- Utopia CDP (2000, 63.59%)★

★ No longer African-American majority as of the 2010 Census
★ No longer African-American majority as of the 2020 Census
★ CDP dissolved prior to the 2010 U.S. Census
★ For the 2010 census, the CDPs of Carol City, Andover, Bunche Park, Lake Lucerne, Norland, Opa-locka North, and Scott Lake merged to form the city of Miami Gardens
★ For the 2010 census, the CDPs of Carver Ranches, Lake Forest, Miami Gardens, and Utopia merged to form the city of West Park

== Georgia ==
Population over 100,000

- Atlanta (2000, 61.00%)★
- Savannah (2000, 56.79%)★

Population 25,000 to 99,999

- Albany (2000, 64.52%)
- Candler-McAfee CDP (2000, 94.73%)
- East Point (2000, 77.61%)
- Macon (2000, 62.21%)
- Redan CDP (2000, 90.62%)

Population 10,000 to 24,999

- Americus (58.3%)
- Bainbridge (50.3%)
- Belvedere Park CDP (2000, 82.04%)
- Brunswick (59.8%)
- College Park (2000, 81.17%)
- Cordele (65.0%)
- Dublin (51.4%)
- Moultrie (50.2%)★
- Panthersville CDP (2000, 95.62%)
- Riverdale (67.4%)
- Thomasville (55.4%)
- Union City (69.3%)
- Waycross (53.5%)

Population 5,000 to 9,999

- Blakely (60.0%)
- Cairo (2000, 50.87%)★
- Camilla (65.2%)
- Clarkston (55.7%)
- Conley (2000, 52.54%)
- Eatonton (59.3%)
- Fort Valley (74.7%)
- Gresham Park CDP (2000, 95.04%)
- Midway-Hardwick CDP (2000, 72.31%)
- Quitman (66.4%)
- Sandersville (59.0%)
- Stone Mountain (69.2%)
- Sylvester (60.0%)
- Thomson (56.3%)
- Waynesboro (62.6%)

Population 1,000 to 4,999

- Abbeville (2000, 58.40%)
- Alamo (2000, 52.55%)★
- Arlington (69.9%)
- Ashburn (65.2%)
- Boston (67.6%)
- Broxton (50.4%)★
- Buena Vista (63.4%)
- Cuthbert (74.2%)
- Davisboro (61.3%)
- Dawson (77.3%)
- Donalsonville (58.7%)
- Edison (67.7%)
- Experiment CDP (2000, 52.40%)
- Folkston (51.5%)★
- Forsyth (57.6%)★
- Fort Gaines (67.9%)
- Gordon (51.6%)
- Greensboro (62.0%)
- Helena (2000, 54.14%)
- Jeffersonville (62.4%)
- Lincoln Park CDP (2000, 94.30%)
- Lithonia (79.6%)
- Louisville (65.9%)
- Lumber City (2000, 50.36%)
- Lumpkin (70.4%)
- Marshallville (78.4%)
- Meigs (66.8%)
- Millen (59.3%)
- Montezuma (69.8%)
- Monticello (53.5%)★
- Morgan (66.5%)
- Ocilla (2020, 58.93%)
- Oglethorpe (2000, 70.17%)
- Pelham (56.1%)
- Reynolds (50.6%)★
- Richland (62.5%)
- Rochelle (52.8%)★
- Sardis (2000, 55.17%)★
- Shellman (68.9%)
- Soperton (51.8%)
- Sparta (83.7%)
- Talbotton (77.8%)
- Tennille (56.9%)
- Twin City (53.6%)★
- Unadilla (62.1%)
- Unionville CDP (2000, 96.62%)
- Vienna (66.9%)
- Wadley (77.1%)
- Walthourville (55.1%)
- Warrenton (69.4%)
- Washington (60.8%)
- West Point (57.8%)
- Woodbury (56.5%)
- Wrens (65.2%)
- Wrightsville (53.5%)

Population under 1,000

- Alapaha (2000, 62.76%)
- Baconton (2000, 59.70%)
- Bartow (2000, 58.30%)
- Bronwood (2000, 65.69%)
- Byromville (2000, 51.57%)★
- Camak (2000, 53.33%)★
- Coleman (2000, 61.74%)
- Crawfordville (2000, 56.99%)
- Culloden (2000, 70.85%)★
- Damascus (63.5%)
- Danville (51.2%)★
- De Soto (2000, 65.42%)
- Dooling (66.9%)
- Flovilla (51.5%)★
- Geneva (2000, 52.63%)
- Georgetown (Quitman County) (2000, 60.02%)★
- Greenville (73.2%)
- Harrison (2000, 79.37%)
- Hilltop CDP (2000, 87.78%)
- Hiltonia (2000, 69.83%)
- Ideal (66.2%)
- Irwinton (57.1%)
- Junction City (2000, 60.34%)
- Keysville (2000, 62.22%)
- Leary (2000, 75.08%)
- Luthersville (51.9%)★
- Manassas (59.0%)★
- McIntyre (2000, 57.52%)
- Midville (2000, 66.74%)★
- Morven (2000, 52.05%)★
- Newton (2000, 53.58%)★
- Norwood (2000, 62.54%)
- Oliver (2000, 50.59%)★
- Phillipsburg CDP (2000, 94.36%)
- Pineview (62.8%)
- Plains (2000, 59.50%)★
- Riceboro (88.7%)
- Salem CDP (2000, 95.87%)
- Sharon (2000, 71.43%)
- Siloam (2000, 73.11%)
- Smithville (70.3%)
- Toomsboro (2000, 53.70%)★
- Warwick (61.2%)
- Woodland (2000, 77.78%)
- Woodville (2000, 62.12%)

★ No longer African-American majority as of the 2010 Census
★ No longer African-American majority as of the 2020 Census

== Illinois ==
Population over 25,000

- Calumet City (2000, 52.55%)
- Dolton (2000, 81.88%)
- East St. Louis (2000, 97.34%)
- Harvey (2000, 79.11%)
- Maywood (2000, 82.29%)

Population 10,000 to 24,999

- Bellwood (2000, 81.19%)
- Country Club Hills (2000, 81.43%)
- Hazel Crest (2000, 75.78%)
- Markham (2000, 78.47%)
- Matteson (2000, 62.14%)
- Richton Park (2000, 58.84%)
- Riverdale (2000, 85.96%)
- South Holland (2000, 50.55%)

Population 5,000 to 9,999

- Broadview (2000, 72.75%)
- Calumet Park (2000, 82.62%)
- Centreville (2000, 95.08%)
- Robbins (2000, 94.77%)
- University Park (2000, 83.55%)
- Washington Park (2000, 91.66%)

Population 1,000 to 4,999

- Alorton (2000, 96.76%)
- Baldwin (2000, 58.75%)★
- Burnham (2000, 53.91%)
- Cairo (2000, 61.56%)
- Dixmoor (2000, 56.53%)★
- Fairmont (2000, 53.57%)★
- Ford Heights (2000, 95.37%)
- Mounds (2000, 59.89%)
- Oak Grove (2000, 57.74%)★
- Olympia Fields (2000, 51.69%)
- Phoenix (2000, 93.14%)
- Preston Heights CDP (2000, 63.24%)★
- Venice (2000, 93.04%)

Population under 1,000

- Brooklyn (2000, 98.22%)
- Hopkins Park (2000, 92.12%)
- Pulaski (2000, 70.80%)
- Royal Lakes (2000, 80.53%)
- Sun River Terrace (2000, 88.25%)

★ No longer African-American majority as of the 2010 Census
★ No longer African-American majority as of the 2020 Census
★ The Black population count for Oak Grove erroneously included part of East Moline for the 2000 Census and was not Black majority despite being listed as such in the U.S. Census

== Indiana ==
Population 25,000 to 99,999

- Gary (2000, 83.41%)

== Kentucky ==
Population 10,000 to 24,999

- Newburg CDP (2000, 57.75%)★

Population under 1,000

- Poplar Hills (2000, 55.05%)★

★ Merged into the newly formed Louisville-Jefferson County unified government in 2003
★ No longer African-American majority as of the 2020 Census

== Louisiana ==
Population over 100,000

- New Orleans (2000, 66.72%)
- Shreveport (2000, 50.57%)

Population 25,000 to 99,999

- Alexandria (2000, 54.57%)
- Monroe (2000, 60.82%)

Population 10,000 to 24,999

- Baker (2000, 52.17%)
- Bastrop (64.5%)
- Donaldsonville (69.1%)
- Merrydale CDP (2000, 89.89%)
- Minden (2000, 52.02%)
- Natchitoches (2000, 52.61%)
- Opelousas (69.1%)
- Woodmere CDP (2000, 65.05%)

Population 5,000 to 9,999

- Brownfields CDP (2000, 51.67%)
- Franklin (50.0%)
- Gardere CDP (2000, 70.63%)★
- Jeanerette (59.7%)
- Lake Providence (79.5%)
- Mansfield (64.3%)
- Port Allen (2000, 53.83%)
- Reserve CDP (2000, 53.88%)
- St. Gabriel (2000, 71.74%)★
- St. Martinville (62.8%)
- Tallulah (74.8%)
- Ville Platte (58.7%)
- Waggaman CDP (2000, 54.18%)
- Winnsboro (58.5%)

Population 1,000 to 4,999

- Amite City (51.8%)
- Arcadia (60.6%)
- Baldwin (64.5%)
- Belle Rose CDP (2000, 59.10%)
- Boutte (64.1%)
- Boyce (74.4%)
- Bunkie (2000, 50.15%)
- Campti (74.5%)
- Clinton (2000, 57.56%)
- Colfax (67.81%)
- Coushatta (65.4%)
- Cullen (84.9%)
- Delhi (56.8%)
- Edgard CDP (2000, 94.77%)
- Epps (63.1%)
- Farmerville (63.5%)
- Ferriday (74.9%)
- Franklinton (51.9%)★
- Garyville CDP (2000, 52.04%)★
- Gibsland (82.8%)
- Grambling (97.1%)
- Grand Coteau (67.7%)
- Hahnville (50.9%)★
- Homer (61.3%)
- Jackson (52.3%)★
- Jonesville (59.2%)
- Kentwood (64.85%)
- Lecompte (74.3%)
- Mansura (60.3%)
- Maringouin (79.4%)
- Monticello CDP (2000, 63.74%)
- New Roads (59.3%)
- New Sarpy (51.6%)★
- Newellton (64.7%)
- North Vacherie CDP (2000, 74.99%)
- Rayville (67.3%)
- Richwood (88.2%)
- Ringgold (55.3%)
- Roseland (65.0%)
- St. Joseph (68.6%)
- Sunset (52.4%)
- Supreme CDP (2000, 83.56%)
- Washington (56.3%)
- West Ferriday (57.6%)
- White Castle (76.8%)

Population under 1,000

- Bonita (2000, 55.52%)
- Cheneyville (65.7%)
- Clarence (74.03%)
- Clayton (67.3%)
- East Hodge (2000, 95.08%)
- Fenton (2000, 51.84%)★
- Harrisonburg (2000, 54.83%)★
- Killona CDP (2000, 91.34%)
- Lucky (2020, 69.30%)
- Marion (54.1%)
- Napoleonville (69.8%)
- Natchez (91.9%)
- Palmetto (2000, 57.45%)★
- Pioneer (2000, 52.63%)★
- Powhatan (2000, 72.28%)
- Sicily Island (2000, 54.08%)
- South Mansfield (2000, 73.30%)
- Tangipahoa (91.6%)
- Wallace (2000, 93.68%)
- Waterproof (87.4%)
- Wilson (79.8%)

★ No longer African-American majority as of the 2010 Census
★ No longer African-American majority as of the 2020 Census

== Maryland ==
Population over 500,000

- Baltimore (2000, 64.04%)

Population 25,000 to 50,000

- Chillum CDP (2000, 61.76%)★
- Clinton CDP (2000, 73.29%)
- Lochearn CDP (2000, 78.04%)
- Milford Mill CDP (2000, 78.67%)
- Oxon Hill-Glassmanor CDP (2000, 86.16%)★
- Randallstown CDP (2000, 71.63%)
- Suitland-Silver Hill CDP (2000, 92.48%)★
- Woodlawn CDP (Baltimore County) (2000, 51.18%)

Population 10,000 to 24,999

- Camp Springs CDP (2000, 73.91%)
- Coral Hills CDP (2000, 93.10%)
- Forestville CDP (2000, 85.35%)
- Fort Washington CDP (2000, 66.79%)
- Greater Landover CDP (2000, 91.56%)★
- Greater Upper Marlboro CDP (2000, 74.89%)★
- Hillcrest Heights CDP (2000, 92.76%)
- Kettering CDP (2000, 90.25%)
- Lanham-Seabrook CDP (2000, 63.17%)★
- Largo CDP (2000, 91.98%)
- New Carrollton (2000, 66.85%)
- Rosaryville CDP (2000, 59.22%)
- Walker Mill CDP (2000, 94.63%)

Population 5,000 to 9,999

- Bladensburg (2000, 70.08%)
- Carmody Hills-Pepper Mill Village CDP (2000, 96.71%)
- Cheverly (2000, 56.40%)★
- District Heights (2000, 87.75%)
- Friendly CDP (2000, 76.99%)
- Glenarden (2000, 95.65%)
- Goddard CDP (2000, 52.93%)★
- Jessup CDP (2000, 67.60%)
- Lake Arbor CDP (2000, 87.93%)
- Marlow Heights CDP (2000, 87.95%)
- Marlton CDP (2000, 55.28%)
- Mitchellville CDP (2000, 78.05%)
- Mount Rainier (2000, 60.71%)★
- Temple Hills CDP (2000, 84.18%)
- Woodlawn CDP (Prince George's County) (2000, 71.36%)★
- Woodmore (2000, 64.47%)

Population 1,000 to 4,999

- Capitol Heights (2000, 92.36%)
- Cottage City (2000, 52.99%)★
- Fairmount Heights (2000, 95.49%)
- Forest Heights (2000, 78.80%)
- Landover Hills (2000, 63.43%)★
- Morningside (2000, 50.35%)★
- Princess Anne (2000, 62.08%)
- Seat Pleasant (2000, 96.38%)
- Springdale CDP (2000, 91.95%)

Population 100 to 999

- North Brentwood (2000, 81.66%)★

Population under 100

- Eagle Harbor (2000, 65.45%)

★ No longer African-American majority as of the 2010 Census
★ No longer African-American majority as of the 2020 Census
★ divided into Oxon Hill CDP and Glassmanor CDP for the 2010 Census
★ divided into Silver Hill CDP and Suitland CDP for the 2010 Census
★ divided into Lanham CDP and Seabrook CDP for the 2010 Census
★ renamed Landover CDP for the 2010 Census
★ divided into Marlboro Meadows CDP, Brock Hall CDP, Marlboro Village CDP, Queenland CDP, and Croom CDP for the 2010 Census
★ CDP dissolved prior to the 2010 U.S. Census

== Michigan ==
Population over 500,000

- Detroit (2000, 81.15%)

Population 100,000 to 499,999

- Flint (2000, 53.01%)

Population 25,000 to 99,999

- Southfield (2000, 53.97%)
- Inkster (2000, 67.30%)

Population 10,000 to 24,999

- Beecher CDP (2000, 65.61%)
- Benton Harbor (2000, 92.14%)
- Benton Charter Township (2000, 51.68%)★
- Buena Vista Charter Township (2000, 55.03%)
- Highland Park (2000, 93.14%)
- Muskegon Heights (2000, 77.31%)

Population 5,000 to 9,999

- Benton Heights CDP (2000, 65.39%)
- Buena Vista CDP (2000, 68.63%)
- Royal Oak Charter Township (2000, 71.06%)

★ No longer African-American majority as of the 2010 Census
★ No longer African-American majority as of the 2020 Census

== Mississippi ==
Population over 100,000

- Jackson (2000, 70.34%)

Population 25,000 to 99,999

- Columbus (54.4%)
- Greenville (2000, 69.35%)
- Meridian (2000, 54.14%)
- Vicksburg (2000, 60.18%)

Population 10,000 to 24,999

- Clarksdale (68.5%)
- Greenwood (65.4%)
- Indianola (73.4%)
- Laurel (55.0%)
- McComb (58.4%)
- Moss Point (2000, 70.25%)
- Natchez (2000, 54.27%)
- West Point (56.2%)
- Yazoo City (69.7%)

Population 5,000 to 9,999

- Aberdeen (60.2%)
- Brookhaven (50.9%)
- Canton (80.3%)
- Crystal Springs (55.8%)
- Forest (2000, 50.14%)★
- Hollandale (83.2%)
- Holly Springs (76.2%)
- Leland (67.0%)
- Louisville (52.5%)
- Waynesboro (57.3%)
- Winona (50.7%)

Population 1,000 to 4,999

- Belzoni (2000, 67.37%)
- Brooksville (2000, 79.27%)
- Bude (2010, 54.77%)
- Centreville (2000, 67.32%)
- Charleston (2000, 59.10%)
- Coldwater (2000, 69.65%)
- Collins (2000, 51.88% )
- Como (2000, 71.76%)
- Derma (2000, 57.67%)
- Drew (2000, 72.76%)
- Durant (2000, 69.88%)
- Edwards (2000, 78.32%)
- Fayette (2000, 96.79%)
- Friars Point (2000, 92.57%)
- Gloster (2000, 54.43%)
- Goodman (2000, 65.26%)
- Hazlehurst (2000, 68.14%)
- Inverness (2000, 58.37%)★
- Itta Bena (2000, 80.30%)
- Jonestown (Coahoma County) (2000, 96.24%)
- Lambert (2000, 82.66%)
- Lexington (2000, 65.63%)
- Lumberton (2000, 53.55%)
- Macon (2000, 67.21%)
- Magnolia (2000, 53.50%)
- Marks (2000, 64.35%)
- Metcalfe (2000, 97.11%)
- Moorhead (2000, 78.20%)
- Mound Bayou (2000, 98.05%)
- Newton (2000, 54.58%)
- North Tunica CDP (2000, 94.55%)
- Okolona (2000, 58.84%)
- Pickens (2000, 86.49%)
- Port Gibson (2000, 79.35%)
- Rolling Fork (2000, 68.42%)
- Rosedale (2000, 81.44%)
- Ruleville (2000, 79.96%)
- Sardis (2000, 55.99%)
- Shannon (2000, 53.89%)
- Shaw (2000, 91.57%)
- Shelby (2000, 90.64%)
- Summit (2000, 66.04%)
- Tchula (2000, 95.45%)
- Terry (2000, 50.45%)
- Tutwiler (2000, 86.95%)
- Verona (2000, 57.59%)
- Woodville (2000, 73.99%)

Population 100 to 999

- Alligator (2000, 77.27%)
- Anguilla (2000, 76.96%)
- Arcola (2000, 94.85%)
- Artesia (2000, 79.32%)
- Beauregard (2000, 53.58%)★
- Benoit (2000, 76.10%)
- Beulah (2000, 95.98%)
- Bolton (2000, 66.45%)
- Cary (2000, 63.00%)
- Coahoma (2000, 98.15%)
- Coffeeville (2000, 53.23%)
- Crawford (2000, 92.67%)
- Crenshaw (2000, 71.18%)
- Crosby (2000, 71.94%)
- Cruger (2000, 73.27%)
- Doddsville (2000, 67.59%)
- Duck Hill (2000, 63.14%)
- Duncan (2000, 76.99%)
- Falcon (2000, 99.68%)
- Glendora (2000, 89.12%)
- Gunnison (2000, 86.73%)
- Heidelberg (2000, 73.33%)
- Hickory (2000, 55.11%)★
- Isola (2000, 63.67%)
- Kilmichael (2000, 52.41%)
- Lake (2000, 55.15%)★
- Louise (2000, 54.29%)★
- Lula (2000, 77.30%)
- Maben (2000, 57.91%)
- Mayersville (2000, 88.05%)
- Merigold (2000, 56.17%)
- Morgan City (2000, 80.33%)
- Mount Olive (2000, 51.85%)
- Oakland (2000, 74.91%)
- Pace (2000, 82.14%)
- Renova (2000, 95.83%)
- Roxie (2000, 58.52%)
- Schlater (2000, 60.57%)
- Scooba (2000, 54.27%)
- Shubuta (2000, 72.50%)
- Shuqualak (2000, 69.57%)
- Sidon (2000, 83.18%)
- Silver City (2000, 78.34%)
- Sledge (2000, 75.24%)
- State Line (2000, 56.94%)
- Sunflower (2000, 71.26%)
- Terry (2000, 50.45%)
- Utica (2000, 65.63%)
- Vaiden (2000, 70.95%)
- Webb (2000, 61.33%)
- Weir (2000, 53.71%)
- Winstonville (2000, 97.81%)

★ No longer African-American majority as of the 2010 Census
★ No longer African-American majority as of the 2020 Census

== Missouri ==
Population over 300,000

- St. Louis (2000, 50.96%)★

Population 10,000 to 25,000

- Ferguson (2000, 52.30%)
- Jennings (2000, 78.21%)
- Spanish Lake CDP (2000, 54.54%)

Population 5,000 to 9,999

- Berkeley (2000, 76.40%)
- Black Jack (2000, 71.16%)
- Dellwood (2000, 58.15%)
- Normandy (2000, 66.41%)

Population 1,000 to 4,999

- Bel-Ridge (2000, 79.43%)
- Castle Point CDP (2000, 88.57%)
- Cool Valley (2000, 76.04%)
- Country Club Hills (2000, 80.81%)
- Hanley Hills (2000, 76.60%)
- Hillsdale (2000, 95.33%)
- Moline Acres (2000, 85.42%)
- Northwoods (2000, 92.46%)
- Norwood Court (2000, 92.46%)
- Pagedale (2000, 91.79%)
- Pasadena Hills (2000, 67.31%)
- Pine Lawn (2000, 95.69%)
- Velda City (2000, 95.48%)
- Velda Village Hills (2000, 97.98%)
- Vinita Park (2000, 61.54%)
- Wellston (2000, 91.26%)

Population 100 to 999

- Beverly Hills (2000, 94.36%)
- Flordell Hills (2000, 82.06%)
- Glen Echo Park (2000, 87.35%)
- Greendale (2000, 63.99%)
- Hayti Heights (2000, 98.31%)
- Haywood City (2000, 94.98%)
- Homestown (2000, 88.95%)
- Howardville (2000, 90.94%)
- Kinloch (2000, 95.77%)
- Pasadena Park (2000, 53.37%)
- Uplands Park (2000, 96.52%)
- Vinita Terrace (2000, 73.63%)
- Wilson City (2000, 96.36%)

Population under 100

- North Lilbourn (2000, 93.68%)
- Pinhook (2000, 87.50%)
- Penermon (2000, 84.00%)

★ No longer African-American majority as of the 2010 Census

== New Jersey ==
Population over 100,000

- Newark (2000, 51.94%)★

Population 25,000 to 99,999

- East Orange (2000, 88.23%)
- Irvington (2000, 80.49%)
- Orange (2000, 73.99%)
- Plainfield (2000, 60.00%)★
- Trenton (2000, 50.93%)★
- Willingboro (2000, 65.49%)

Population 10,000 to 24,999

- Asbury Park (2000, 60.46%)★
- Pleasantville (2000, 55.61%)★
- Roselle (2000, 50.15%)★

Population 5,000 to 9,999

- Salem (2000, 55.66%)

Population 1,000 to 4,999

- Chesilhurst (2000, 55.59%)★
- Lawnside (2000, 92.79%)

★ No longer African-American majority as of the 2010 Census
★ No longer African-American majority as of the 2020 Census

== New York ==
Population over 50,000

- Hempstead (2000, 50.80%)★
- Mount Vernon (2000, 58.33%)

=== Places with fewer than 25,000 people ===
- Lakeview CDP (2000, 83.36%)
- North Amityville CDP (2000, 66.81%)★
- Roosevelt CDP (2000, 77.63%)★
- South Floral Park (2000, 57.86%)★
- Uniondale CDP (2000, 53.82%)★
- Wyandanch CDP (2000, 75.37%)★
- Gordon Heights CDP (2000, 59.66%)★
- Fairview CDP (Westchester County) (2000, 72.19%)★

★ No longer African-American majority as of the 2010 Census
★ No longer African-American majority as of the 2020 Census

== North Carolina ==
Population over 50,000

- Rocky Mount (2000, 55.78%)

Population 25,000 to 49,999

- Goldsboro (2000, 51.98%)

Population 10,000 to 24,999 people

- Elizabeth City (2000, 56.39%)
- Henderson (2000, 58.86%)
- Kinston (2000, 62.45%)

Population 5,000 to 9,999

- Edenton (55.2%)
- Oxford (51.4%)
- Spring Lake (2000, 50.05%)★
- Wadesboro (56.4%)
- Washington (50.5%)★
- Williamston (57.5%)

Population 1,000 to 4,999

- Ahoskie (2000, 58.28%)
- Belhaven (2000, 60.57%)★
- Bethel (58.1%)
- Brogden CDP (2000, 56.55%)★
- Chadbourn (53.5%)
- East Spencer (85.8%)
- Elm City (53.9%)
- Enfield (79.3%)
- Fairmont (58.7%)
- Fremont (2000, 50.65%)★
- Garysburg (96.1%)
- Green Level (2000, 72.97%)★
- Maxton (64.1%)
- Mount Olive (2000, 53.97%)★
- Navassa (2000, 86.22%)
- Pinetops (2000, 55.95%)
- Plymouth (2000, 62.89%)
- Polkton (2000, 56.32%)★
- Robersonville (2000, 61.47%)
- Rowland (2000, 67.80%)
- Scotland Neck (2000, 67.57%)
- Sharpsburg (2000, 58.36%)
- Silver City CDP (2000, 93.80%)
- South Weldon CDP (2000, 84.72%)
- Weldon (2000, 62.59%)
- Windsor (2000, 52.83%)

Population 100 to 999

- Ansonville (2000, 76.10%)
- Bolton (2000, 63.56%)
- Bowmore CDP (2000, 57.93%)
- Brunswick (2000, 55.00%)
- Cofield (2000, 80.40%)
- Columbia (2000, 52.01%)★
- Conetoe (2000, 63.56%)
- East Arcadia (2000, 89.69%)
- Fair Bluff (2000, 59.27%)
- Fountain (2000, 50.47%)★
- Hamilton (2000, 51.94%)
- Hassell (2000, 62.50%)
- Hobgood (2000, 51.98%)★
- Kelford (2000, 65.31%)
- Kingstown (2000, 92.54%)
- Lewiston Woodville (2000, 66.23%)
- Light Oak CDP (2000, 82.16%)
- Middleburg (2000, 63.58%)
- Morven (2000, 76.51%)
- Northwest (2000, 71.83%)
- Parmele (2000, 85.86%)
- Princeville (2000, 96.91%)
- Rich Square (55.9%)
- Roper (2000, 74.71%)
- Seaboard (2000, 70.94%)
- Whitakers (2000, 58.32%)
- Winton (2000, 67.26%)

Population less than 100

- Hassell (2000, 62.50%)

★ No longer African-American majority as of the 2010 Census
★ No longer African-American majority as of the 2020 Census

== Ohio ==
Population over 100,000

- Cleveland (50.48%)★

Population 25,000 to 99,999

- East Cleveland (2000, 92.92%)
- Trotwood (2000, 58.18%)

Population 10,000 to 24,999 people

- Bedford Heights (2000, 66.95%)
- Forest Park (2000, 56.06%)
- Warrensville Heights (2000, 90.01%)

Population 5,000 to 9,999

- Silverton (2000, 50.17%)★

Population 1,000 to 4,999

- Fort McKinley CDP (2000, 53.00%)
- Golf Manor (2000, 62.69%)
- Highland Hills (2000, 64.83%)
- Lincoln Heights (2000, 97.52%)
- Oakwood (Cuyahoga County) (2000, 55.88%)
- Wilberforce CDP (2000, 83.79%)
- Woodlawn (2000, 68.22%)

Population less than 1,000

- Maplewood Park CDP (2000, 58.26%)★
- North Randall (2000, 71.19%)
- Urbancrest (2000, 57.95%)

★ No longer African-American majority as of the 2010 Census
★ No longer African-American majority as of the 2020 Census

== Oklahoma ==
Population 1,000 to 5,000

- Boley (2000, 54.62%)★
- Forest Park (2000, 72.14%)
- Langston (2000, 92.87%)
- Spencer (2000, 51.58%)

Population 100 to 999

- Arcadia (2000, 55.56%)★
- Boynton (2000, 55.11%)★
- Fort Coffee (2000, 62.86%)
- Grayson (2000, 61.94%) ★
- Redbird (2000, 87.58%)★
- Rentiesville (2000, 64.71%)
- Summit (2000, 84.07%)
- Taft (2000, 85.10%)
- Tatums (2000, 78.49%)
- Tullahassee (2000, 66.98%)★

Population less than 100

- Clearview (2000, 75.00%)
- Meridian (Logan County) (2000, 83.33%)

★ No longer African-American majority as of the 2010 Census
★ No longer African-American majority as of the 2020 Census

== Pennsylvania ==
Population over 25,000

- Chester (2000, 74.62%)
- Harrisburg (2000, 53.71%)★

Population 10,000 to 25,000

- Darby (2000, 59.65%)
- Wilkinsburg (2000, 66.08%)
- Yeadon (2000, 80.42%)

Population 5,000 to 9,999

Population 1,000 to 4,999

- Braddock (2000, 65.64%)
- Chester Township (2000, 72.85%)
- Colwyn (2000, 51.45%)
- Homestead (2000, 51.19%)
- Rankin (2000, 69.16%)
- South Coatesville (2000, 55.57%)★

★ No longer African-American majority as of the 2010 Census
★ No longer African-American majority as of the 2020 Census

== South Carolina ==
Population 10,000 to 25,000

- Dentsville CDP (2000, 57.78%)
- Gantt CDP (2000, 62.86%)
- Orangeburg (2000, 67.19%)
- St. Andrews CDP (2000, 52.38%)

Population 5,000 to 9,999

- Bennettsville (63.2%)
- Cheraw (52.2%)
- Chester (62.3%)
- Darlington (56.0%)
- Georgetown (57.0%)
- Lake City (71.4%)
- Marion (66.2%)
- Mullins (61.6%)

Population 1,000 to 4,999

- Allendale (80.0%)
- Andrews (60.8%)
- Awendaw (64.6%)
- Bamberg (53.6%)
- Bishopville (65.8%)
- Blackville (75.6%)
- Bowman (2000, 68.70%)
- Brookdale CDP (2000, 97.80%)
- Bucksport (96.6%)
- Calhoun Falls (52.7%)
- Denmark (85.9%)
- Edgefield (59.9%)
- Edisto CDP (2000, 69.34%)
- Estill (79.4%)
- Fairfax (73.5%)
- Gray Court (2000, 53.97%)★
- Hollywood (2000, 68.50%)★
- Johnston (62.6%)
- Judson CDP (2000, 56.56%)★
- Kingstree (64.7%)
- Lancaster Mill (53.3%)
- Manning (62.4%)
- Mayesville (2000, 86.01%)
- McCormick (64.1%)
- Pamplico (2000, 52.15%)★
- Ridgeville (2000, 58.64%)
- St. Matthews (61.5%)
- St. Stephen (58.2%)
- South Sumter CDP (2000, 89.51%)
- Summerton (57.2%)
- Timmonsville (2000, 76.98%)
- Varnville (60.3%)
- Wilkinson Heights CDP (2000, 95.11%)
- Winnsboro (58.5%)

Population less than 1,000

- Atlantic Beach (2000, 82.05%)★
- Blenheim (2000, 54.74%)★
- Carlisle (2000, 91.73%)
- Clarks Hill CDP (2000, 85.37%)
- Clio (2000, 56.98%)
- Cokesbury (2000, 72.76%)
- Cope (2000, 56.07%)★
- Cross Hill (2000, 55.41%)
- Eastover (2000, 92.41%)
- Ehrhardt (2000, 56.68%)★
- Elko (2000, 58.49%)
- Furman (2000, 72.38%)
- Gifford (2000, 92.70%)
- Greeleyville (2000, 58.19%)
- Heath Springs (2000, 50.69%)★
- Kline (2000, 56.72%)★
- Lane (2000, 89.74%)
- Lynchburg (2000, 73.64%)
- Mount Carmel CDP (2000, 89.87%)
- Pinewood (2000, 56.21%)
- Promised Land CDP (2000, 95.71%)
- Quinby (2000, 55.82%)
- Rembert CDP (2000, 74.38%)
- Richburg (2000, 73.80%)
- Ridge Spring (2000, 62.09%)
- Rowesville (2000, 60.58%)★
- Santee (2000, 70.68%)
- Scotia (2000, 72.69%)
- Scranton (2000, 55.84%)
- Sellers (2000, 85.56%)
- Shiloh CDP (Sumter County) (2000, 58.30%)★
- Society Hill (2000, 53.71%)★
- Stuckey (2000, 79.47%)
- Vance (2000, 84.62%)
- Wagener (2000, 60.95%)
- Waterloo (2000, 55.67%)
- Willington CDP (2000, 82.49%)
- Yemassee (2000, 55.39%)

★ No longer African-American majority as of the 2010 Census
★ No longer African-American majority as of the 2020 Census

== Tennessee ==
Population over 500,000

- Memphis (2000, 61.18%)

Population 10,000 to 25,000

- Brownsville (2000, 60.44%)

Population 5,000 to 9,999

- Bolivar (2000, 56.26%)

Population 1,000 to 4,999

- Mason (2000, 50.96%)
- Whiteville (2000, 60.90%)

Population less than 1,000

- Gallaway (2000, 59.01%)★
- Gates (2000, 53.27%)★
- Henning (2000, 74.74%)
- Stanton (2000, 67.32%)

★ No longer African-American majority as of the 2010 Census
★ No longer African-American majority as of the 2020 Census

== Texas ==
Population over 25,000

- Lancaster (2000, 65.60%)

Population 10,000 to 25,000

- Forest Hill (2000, 56.80%)★

Population 5,000 to 9,999

Population 1,000 to 4,999

- Ames (2000, 89.34%)
- Barrett CDP (2000, 86.32%)★
- Calvert (2000, 52.24%)★
- Prairie View (2000, 93.27%)
- San Augustine (2000, 57.78%)

Population 100 to 999

- Browndell (2000, 60.73%)★
- Cuney (2000, 83.45%)
- Easton (2000, 66.60%)
- Goodlow (2000, 94.70%)
- Kendleton (2000, 78.54%)
- Moore Station (2000, 98.91%)
- Seven Oaks (2000, 58.02%)★
- Scottsville (2000, 54.75%)★

Population less than 100

- Domino (2000, 63.46%)
- Neylandville (2000, 96.43%)★
- Toco (2000, 76.40%)

★No longer African-American majority as of the 2010 Census
★No longer African-American majority as of the 2020 Census

== Virginia ==
Population over 200,000

- Richmond (2000, 56.86%)☆★

Population over 100,000

- Portsmouth (2000, 50.28%)☆

Population 25,000 to 50,000

- Petersburg (2000, 78.57%)☆

Population 10,000 to 24,999

- East Highland Park CDP (2000, 79.11%)
- Highland Springs CDP (51.8%)

Population 5,000 to 9,999

- Emporia (2000, 56.03%)☆
- Ettrick CDP (2000, 74.41%)
- Franklin (2000, 52.13%)☆

Population 1,000 to 49,999

- Lawrenceville (2000, 63.69%)
- Rushmere CDP (2000, 61.87%)★
- Wakefield (2000, 51.06%)★
- Waverly (2000, 61.54%)

Population below 1,000

- Dendron (2000, 50.84%)
- Laurel Park CDP (2000, 64.02%)
- Nassawadox (2000, 54.20%)★
- Sandy Level CDP (2000, 73.15%)

☆ Independent City
★ No longer African-American majority as of the 2010 Census
★ No longer African-American majority as of the 2020 Census

== West Virginia ==
Population under 1,000

- Keystone (2000, 72.85%)
- Kimball (2000, 63.26%)
- Northfork (2000, 53.56%)

== Counties ==
=== Alabama ===
- Bullock County (2000, 72.44%)
- Dallas County (2000, 62.98%)
- Greene County (2000, 79.85%)
- Hale County (2000, 58.62%)
- Lowndes County (2000, 73.04%)
- Macon County (2000, 84.21%)
- Marengo County (2000, 51.38%)
- Perry County (2000, 67.93%)
- Sumter County (2000, 72.43%)
- Wilcox County (2000, 71.48%)

=== Arkansas ===
- Chicot County (2000, 53.42%)
- Lee County (2000, 56.77%)
- Phillips County (2000, 58.59%)

=== Florida ===
- Gadsden County (2000, 56.85%)

=== Georgia ===
- Baker County (2000, 50.02%)★
- Burke County (2000, 50.74%)★
- Calhoun County (2000, 58.96%)
- Clay County (2000, 59.85%)
- Clayton County (2000, 51.08%)
- DeKalb County (2000, 53.82%)
- Dougherty County (2000, 59.88%)
- Hancock County (2000, 77.61%)
- Jefferson County (2000, 55.97%)
- Macon County (2000, 59.24%)
- Randolph County (2000, 59.16%)
- Stewart County (2000, 60.95%)★
- Talbot County (2000, 61.16%)
- Taliaferro County (2000, 60.23%)
- Terrell County (2000, 60.29%)
- Warren County (2000, 59.26%)
- Washington County (2000, 53.05%)

=== Louisiana ===
- East Carroll Parish (2000, 66.84%)
- Madison Parish (2000, 60.16%)
- Orleans Parish (2000, 66.72%)
- St. Helena Parish (2000, 52.07%)
- Tensas Parish (2000, 55.03%)

=== Maryland ===
- Prince George's County (2000, 62.17%)

=== Mississippi ===
- Adams County (2000, 52.49%)
- Bolivar County (2000, 64.84%)
- Claiborne County (2000, 83.61%)
- Clay County (2000, 56.10%)
- Coahoma County (2000, 68.90%)
- Copiah County (2000, 50.69%)
- Hinds County (2000, 60.87%)
- Holmes County (2000, 77.98%)
- Humphreys County (2000, 70.99%)
- Issaquena County (2000, 62.71%)
- Jasper County (2000, 52.68%)
- Jefferson County (2000, 85.97%)
- Jefferson Davis County (2000, 57.02%)
- Kemper County (2000, 57.67%)
- Leflore County (2000, 67.27%)
- Marshall County (2000, 50.00%)★
- Noxubee County (2000, 68.81%)
- Quitman County (2000, 68.39%)
- Sharkey County (2000, 68.80%)
- Sunflower County (2000, 69.46%)
- Tallahatchie County (2000, 58.94%)
- Tunica County (2000, 69.51%)
- Washington County (2000, 64.30%)
- Wilkinson County (2000, 68.03%)
- Yazoo County (2000, 53.55%)

=== North Carolina ===
- Bertie County (2000, 62.09%)
- Edgecombe County (2000, 57.17%)
- Halifax County (2000, 52.32%)
- Hertford County (2000, 59.18%)
- Northampton County (2000, 52.32%)
- Warren County (2000, 54.16%)★

=== South Carolina ===
- Allendale County (2000, 70.71%)
- Bamberg County (2000, 62.14%)
- Clarendon County (2000, 52.90%)★
- Fairfield County (2000, 58.88%)
- Hampton County (2000, 55.33%)
- Jasper County (2000, 52.48%)★
- Lee County (2000, 63.30%)
- Marion County (2000, 56.00%)
- Marlboro County (2000, 50.52%)★
- McCormick County (2000, 53.72%)★
- Orangeburg County (2000, 60.61%)
- Williamsburg County (2000, 65.95%)

=== Tennessee ===
- Haywood County (2000, 50.85%)

=== Virginia ===
- Brunswick County (2000, 56.55%)
- Greensville County (2000, 59.52%)
- Sussex County (2000, 61.98%)

★ No longer African-American majority as of the 2010 Census
★ No longer African-American majority as of the 2020 Census

== See also ==
- List of U.S. cities with large African-American populations—over 30%, ranked by percentage
- List of African American neighborhoods
- Lists of U.S. cities with non-white majority populations
- List of largest U.S. municipalities by race/ethnicity in 2020
- List of U.S. counties with African American majority populations
- List of U.S. communities with African-American majority populations in 2010
- List of U.S. communities with Hispanic- or Latino-majority populations in the 2000 census
- List of U.S. states and territories by African-American population
- List of West Indian communities in the United States
