= List of U.S. communities with African-American majority populations in 2010 =

The following is a list of United States cities, towns, and census designated places in which a majority (over 50%) of the population is non-Hispanic African American/Black alone as of the 2020 U.S. Census.

A star (★) indicates that by the 2020 census, the community is no longer African-American majority.

== Alabama ==
Population over 100,000

- Birmingham (2010, 73.15%)
- Mobile (2010, 50.33%)★
- Montgomery (2010, 56.38%)★

Population 25,000 to 99,999

- Bessemer (2010, 71.04%)

Population 10,000 to 24,999

- Center Point (2010, 62.54%)★
- Fairfield (2010, 94.35%)
- Forestdale CDP (2010, 71.29%)★
- Prichard (2010, 85.53%)
- Selma (2010, 79.53%)

Population 5,000 to 9,999

- Greenville (2010, 55.23%)★
- Lanett (2010, 57.11%)
- Midfield (2010, 81.53%)
- Tarrant (2010, 52.06%)★
- Tuskegee (2010, 95.24%)

Population 1,000 to 4,999

- Brent (2010, 53.35%)★★
- Brighton (2010, 80.68%)
- Fort Deposit (2010, 75.30%)
- Holt CDP (2020, 55.09%)★
- Lipscomb (2010, 60.45%)
- Mosses (2010, 96.70%)
- Mount Vernon (2010, 73.38%)
- Selmont-West Selmont CDP (2010, 93.79%)

Population 100 to 999

- Akron (2010, 86.52%)
- Beatrice (2010, 76.08%)
- Bellamy CDP (2010, 89.50%)★
- Boligee (2010, 89.94%)
- Boykin (2010, 95.27%)★
- Deer Park CDP (2010, 66.49%)★
- Edgewater CDP (2010, 68.29%)
- Hissop CDP (2010, 73.10%)★
- Macedonia CDP (2010, 91.10%)
- Malcolm CDP (2010, 57.22%)★★
- Orrville (2010, 62.25%)★
- Movico CDP (2010, 96.72%)★
- Panola CDP (2010, 97.92%)★
- Thomaston (2010, 53.24%)★★
- Vinegar Bend CDP (2010, 79.17%)★

Population under 100

- McMullen (2010, 60.00%)
- Oak Hill (2010, 69.23%)★

★ African-American majority as of the 2010 Census
★ No longer African-American majority as of the 2020 Census
★ New jurisdiction first appearing in the 2010 Census

== Arkansas ==
Population over 25,000

- Pine Bluff (2010, 75.27%)
- West Memphis (2010, 63.28%)

Population 10,000 to 24,999

- Camden (2010, 55.86%)★
- Helena-West Helena (2010, 74.13%)★

Population 5,000 to 9,999

- Osceola (2010, 53.86%)

Population 1,000 to 4,999

- Earle (2010, 81.81%)
- Edmondson (2010, 65.81%%)
- Fordyce (2010, 53.33%)★
- Lewisville (2010, 55.23%)★
- Luxora (2010, 60.78%)
- Marvell (2010, 62.06%)
- McNeil (2010, 52.91%)

Population 100 to 999

- Allport (2010, 80.87%)
- Altheimer (2010, 87.80%)
- Bluff City (2010, 68.55%)
- Bradley (2010, 56.21%)
- Carthage (2010, 79.30%)
- Chidester (2010, 57.49%)
- College Station CDP (2010, 90.33%)
- Cotton Plant (2010, 72.57%)
- Elaine (2010, 60.53%)
- Garland (2010, 71.90%)
- Grady (2010, 68.37%)
- Gum Springs (2010, 53.33%)
- Haynes (2010, 89.33%)
- Holly Grove (2010, 83.72%)
- Huttig (2010, 51.76%)★
- Jennette (2010, 93.91%)
- Jericho (2010, 97.48%)
- Lake View (2010, 92.78%)
- Madison (2010, 82.83%)
- Menifee (2010, 83.11%)
- Mitchellville (2010, 93.06%)
- Montrose (2010, 62.99%)
- Parkdale (2010, 66.43%)
- Perla (2010, 56.43%)★
- Reed (2010, 88.65%)
- Rondo (2010, 70.71%)
- Rosston (2010, 62.07%)
- Strong (2010, 60.75%)
- Sunset (2010, 91.92%)
- Sweet Home CDP (2010, 69.73%)
- Tollette (2010, 96.67%)
- Turrell (2010, 85.04%)
- Twin Groves (2010, 55.22%)★
- Wabbaseka (2010, 75.69%)
- Widener (2010, 60.07%)
- Wilmar (2010, 71.23%)
- Wilmot (2010, 76.73%)
- Winchester (2010, 68.86%)

Population under 100

- Birdsong (2010, 70.73%)
- McNab (2010, 60.29%)★
- Fargo (2010, 56.12%)★
- Sherrill (2010, 55.95%)★★
- Woodson (2010, 70.97%)

★ African-American majority as of the 2010 Census
★ No longer African-American majority as of the 2020 Census
★ New jurisdiction formed out of the consolidation of Helena and West Helena

== California ==
- Ladera Heights CDP (2010, 72.39%)
- View Park–Windsor Hills CDP (2010, 83.15%)
- West Athens CDP (2010, 51.46%)★
- West Rancho Dominguez (2010, 51.31%)★
- Westmont (2010, 50.09%)★

★ No longer African-American majority as of the 2020 Census

== Connecticut ==
Population 10,000 to 24,999

- Bloomfield (2010, 56.22%)

Population 1,000 to 4,999

- Blue Hills (2010, 86.52%)

== Delaware ==
- Wilmington (2010, 56.70%)

== District of Columbia ==
- Washington D.C. (50.03%)★

★No longer African-American majority as of the 2020 Census

== Florida ==
Population over 100,000

- Miami Gardens (2010, 73.37%)★

Population 25,000 to 99,999

- Golden Glades CDP (2010, 70.47%)
- Lauderdale Lakes (2010, 79.43%)
- Lauderhill (2010, 74.71%)
- North Lauderdale (2010, 52.00%)★
- North Miami (2010, 56.55%)
- Pine Hills CDP (2010, 65.99%)
- Riviera Beach (2010, 65.03%)

Population 10,000 to 24,999

- Belle Glade (2010, 55.62%)
- Brownsville CDP (2010, 72.36%)
- Florida City (2010, 50.46%)★
- Goulds CDP (2010, 52.76%)★
- Gladeview CDP (2010, 73.07%)
- Opa-locka (2010, 61.54%)★
- Pinewood CDP (2010, 72.61%)
- West Park (2010, 55.30%)★

Population 5,000 to 9,999

- Fort Pierce North CDP (2010, 69.57%)
- Lake Park (2010, 53.68%)★
- Pahokee (2010, 55.39%)
- Pembroke Park (2010, 53.29%)★
- Progress Village CDP (2010, 50.06%)★
- Quincy (2010, 64.11%)
- Richmond Heights CDP (2010, 69.79%)
- South Apopka CDP (2010, 62.90%)
- West Perrine CDP (2010, 60.27%)★
- Westview CDP (2010, 66.47%)

Population 1,000 to 4,999

- Boulevard Gardens CDP (2010, 93.33%)
- Century (2010, 55.83%)
- Chattahoochee (2000, 51.29%)★
- Cypress Quarters CDP (2010, 57.61%)
- DeLand Southwest CDP (2010, 69.39%)
- Eatonville (2010, 82.82%)
- Goulding CDP (2010, 61.26%)
- Gretna (2010, 83.42%)
- Harlem CDP (2010, 95.52%)
- Havana (2010, 53.42%)
- Jasper (2010, 50.15%)★★
- Limestone Creek CDP (2010, 60.55%)★
- Madison (2010, 65.74%)
- Mangonia Park (2010, 81.30%)
- Midway (Gadsden County) (2010, 85.79%)
- Midway CDP (Seminole County) (2010, 83.99%)
- Ridgecrest CDP (2010, 67.20%)
- Roosevelt Gardens CDP (2010, 95.85%)
- South Bay (2010, 63.99%)
- Tangelo Park CDP (2010, 82.43%)
- Washington Park CDP (2010, 94.56%)

Population 100 to 999

- Campbellton (2010, 64.78%)
- Charleston Park CDP (2010, 73.39%)
- East Williston CDP (2010, 79.83%)
- Franklin Park CDP (2010, 97.09%)
- Greenville (2010, 70.58%)
- Homestead Base CDP (2010, 51.04%)★
- Jacob City (2010, 90.40%)
- Lamont CDP (2010, 58.43%)★
- Lloyd CDP (2010 52.09%)★
- Raleigh CDP (2010, 55.23%)★
- Tildenville CDP (2010, 77.69%)

★ New jurisdiction first appearing in the 2010 Census
★ African-American majority as of the 2010 Census
★ No longer African-American majority as of the 2020 Census

== Georgia ==
Population over 100,000

- Atlanta (2010, 53.41%)★
- Augusta (2010, 54.08%)★
- Savannah (2010, 54.87%)★

Population 25,000 to 99,999

- Albany (2010, 71.30%)
- Douglasville (2010, 55.01%)★
- Macon (2010, 67.62%)
- Redan CDP (2010, 92.69%)
- Valdosta (2010, 50.66%)★

Population 10,000 to 24,999

- Belvedere Park CDP (2010, 75.59%)
- Candler-McAfee CDP (2010, 90.88%)
- College Park (2010, 78.54%)
- Conyers (2010, 55.77%)★
- Douglas (2010, 51.78%)★

Population 5,000 to 9,999

- Austell (2010, 54.60%)★
- Conley (2010, 57.10%)
- Gresham Park CDP (2010, 88.31%)
- Hardwick CDP (2010, 76.01%)
- Irondale CDP (2010, 57.35%)★
- Panthersville CDP (2010, 95.98%)

Population 1,000 to 4,999

- Abbeville (2010, 55.26%)
- Alamo (2010, 56.74%)★
- Chester (2010, 57.58%)★
- Helena (2010, 54.14%)★
- Lumber City (2010, 50.98%)
- Ocilla (2010, 57.38%)
- Oglethorpe (2010, 67.24%)
- Union Point (2010, 53.06%)★
- Unionville CDP (2010, 95.83%)

Population 100 to 999

- Alapaha (2010, 60.93%)
- Baconton (2010, 58.25%)
- Bartow (2010, 58.39%)
- Bronwood (2010, 68.89%)
- Camak (2010, 50.00%)★
- Coleman CDP (2010, 65.35%)
- Crawfordville (2010, 59.74%)
- Culloden (2010, 57.71%)★
- Harrison (2010, 72.60%)
- Hilltop CDP (2010, 88.93%)
- Hiltonia (2010, 66.08%)
- Junction City (2010, 76.27%)
- Keysville (2010, 55.12%)
- Leary (2010, 75.40%)
- Lincoln Park CDP (2010, 91.12%)
- McIntyre (2010, 62.00%)
- Morven (2010, 56.81%)★
- Newton (2010, 51.38%)★
- Norwood (2010, 66.95%)
- Oliver (2010, 53.14%)★
- Payne (2010, 65.14%)★★
- Phillipsburg CDP (2010, 93.95%)
- Salem CDP (2010, 97.42%)
- Sardis (2010, 54.55%)★
- Sharon (2010, 53.57%)
- Siloam (2010, 70.57%)
- Woodland (2010, 75.25%)
- Woodville (2010, 68.22%)

Population under 100

★ African-American majority as of the 2010 Census
★ No longer African-American majority as of the 2020 Census
★ City dissolved in 2020
★ City merged into the city of McRae-Helena in 2020

== Illinois ==
Population over 25,000

- Calumet City (2010, 69.89%)

Population 10,000 to 25,000

- Bellwood (2010, 74.67%)
- Cahokia (2010, 62.04%)★
- Country Club Hills (2010, 86.45%)
- Dolton (2010, 90.41%)
- East St. Louis (2010, 97.67%)
- Harvey (2010, 75.33%)
- Hazel Crest (2010, 84.65%)
- Markham (2010, 80.56%)
- Matteson (2010, 78.03%)
- Maywood (2010, 73.81%)
- Park Forest (2010, 59.05%)
- Richton Park (2010, 81.75%)
- Riverdale (2010, 93.07%)
- Sauk Village (2010, 61.97%)★
- South Holland (2010, 73.82%)

Population 5,000 to 9,999

- Broadview (2010, 75.66%)
- Calumet Park (2010, 87.98%)
- Glenwood (2010, 65.88%)★
- Lynwood (2010, 65.35%)
- Robbins (2010, 93.50%)
- University Park (2010, 89.24%)

Population 1,000 to 4,999

- Alorton (2010, 97.45%)
- Burnham (2010, 61.51%)
- Cairo (2010, 69.55%)
- Centreville (2010, 96.46%)
- Dixmoor (2010, 52.33%)★
- East Hazel Crest (2010, 53.27%)★
- Ford Heights (2010, 95.37%)
- Madison (2010, 55.33%)★
- Olympia Fields (2010, 68.89%)
- Phoenix (2010, 90.68%)
- Preston Heights (2010, 57.44%)★
- Venice (2010, 93.54%)
- Washington Park (2010, 85.77%)

Population under 1,000

- Brooklyn (2010, 93.86%)
- Hopkins Park (2010, 93.37%)
- Mound City (2010, 53.40%)★
- Mounds (2010, 72.22%)
- Pulaski (2010, 66.50%)
- Royal Lakes (2010, 64.47%)
- Sun River Terrace (2010, 86.36%)

★ African-American majority as of the 2010 Census
★ No longer African-American majority as of the 2020 Census

== Indiana ==
- Gary (2010, 83.90%)

== Louisiana ==
Population over 100,000

- Baton Rouge (2010, 54.27%)★
- New Orleans (2010, 59.58%)
- Shreveport (2010, 54.46%)

Population 25,000 to 99,999

- Alexandria (2010, 57.02%)
- Monroe (2010, 63.58%)

Population 10,000 to 24,999

- Baker (2010, 77.09%)
- Gardere CDP (2010, 63.45%)★
- Minden (2010, 51.49%)
- Natchitoches (2010, 58.98%)
- Waggaman CDP (2010, 63.19%)
- Woodmere CDP (2010, 79.49%)

Population 5,000 to 9,999

- Brownfields CDP (2010, 72.08%)
- Garyville CDP (2010, 53.43%)★
- Merrydale CDP (2010, 93.55%)
- Monticello CDP (2010, 83.04%)
- Plaquemine (2010, 50.78%)★★
- Port Allen (2010, 57.86%)
- Reserve CDP (2010, 59.10%)
- St. Gabriel (2010, 63.19%)★

Population 1,000 to 4,999

- Banks Springs CDP (2010, 52.77%)★★
- Belle Rose CDP (2000, 58.04%)
- Bunkie (2010, 56.94%)
- Clinton (2010, 58.80%)
- Cottonport (2010, 52.74%)★
- Edgard CDP (2010, 94.18%)
- Lutcher (2010, 52.29%)★
- North Vacherie CDP (2010, 73.49%)
- Port Sulphur CDP (2010, 64.55%)★
- Violet CDP (2010, 55.10%)★
- Winnfield (2010, 50.25%)★

Population 100 to 999

- Bayou Goula CDP (2010, 93.46%)★
- Bonita (2010, 59.86%)
- East Hodge (2010, 88.58%)
- Fenton (2010, 55.67%)★
- Frierson CDP (2010, 62.94%)★
- Glencoe CDP (2010, 77.25%)★
- Killona CDP (2010, 97.60%)
- Lemannville CDP (2010, 69.65%)★
- Lucky (2010, 66.54%)
- Moonshine CDP (2010, 85.05%)★
- Montpelier (2010, 52.63%)★★
- Pointe à la Hache CDP (2010, 90.91%)★
- Powhatan (2010, 69.63%)
- Romeville CDP (2010, 83.85%)★
- St. James CDP (2010, 79.95%)★
- St. Maurice CDP (2010, 72.45%)★
- Sicily Island (2010, 63.88%)
- Siracusaville CDP (2010, 93.60%)★
- Sorrel CDP (2010, 52.48%)★★
- South Mansfield (2010, 74.86%)
- Union CDP (2010, 80.16%)★
- Wallace CDP (2010, 90.46%)
- Welcome CDP (2010, 94.38%)★

Population under 100

★ African-American majority as of the 2010 Census
★ No longer African-American majority as of the 2020 Census
★ New jurisdiction first appearing in the 2010 Census

== Maryland ==
Population over 100,000

- Baltimore (2010, 63.28%)

Population 25,000 to 99,999

- Clinton CDP (2010, 80.02%)
- Fairland CDP (2010, 50.32%)★
- Landover CDP (2010, 80.90%)
- Lochearn CDP (2010, 80.20%)
- Milford Mill CDP (2010, 83.79%)
- Owings Mills CDP (2010, 50.21%)★
- Randallstown CDP (2010, 80.00%)
- South Laurel CDP (2010, 59.69%)★
- Suitland CDP (2010, 91.26%)★
- Waldorf CDP (2010, 52.48%)★
- Woodlawn CDP (Baltimore County) (2010, 60.85%)

Population 10,000 to 24,999

- Accokeek CDP (2010, 63.43%)★
- Bladensburg (2010, 64.33%)
- Brandywine CDP (2010, 71.62%)★
- Brock Hall CDP (2010, 88.23%)★
- Camp Springs CDP (2010, 77.90%)
- Forestville CDP (2010, 86.99%)
- Fort Washington CDP (2010, 69.89%)
- Glassmanor CDP (2010, 88.20%)★
- Glenn Dale CDP (2010, 58.97%)★
- Hillcrest Heights CDP (2010, 92.09%)
- Kettering CDP (2010, 91.28%)
- Lanham CDP (2010, 64.77%)★
- Largo CDP (2010, 90.49%)
- Mitchellville CDP (2010, 84.62%)
- New Carrollton (2010, 58.13%)
- Oxon Hill CDP (2010, 74.68%)★
- Rosaryville CDP (2010, 80.98%)
- Seabrook CDP (2010, 64.64%)★
- Summerfield CDP (2010, 90.48%)★
- Walker Mill CDP (2010, 94.02%)
- Westphalia CDP (2010, 82.73%)★

Population 5,000 to 9,999

- Bryans Road CDP (2010, 56.17%)
- Cheverly (2010, 56.36%)★
- Coral Hills CDP (2010, 89.24%)
- District Heights (2010, 89.50%)
- Fairwood CDP (2010, 74.80%)★
- Friendly CDP (2010, 78.88%)
- Glenarden (2010, 91.10%)
- Jessup CDP (2010, 60.00%)
- Lake Arbor CDP (2010, 91.48%)
- Marlboro Village CDP (2010, 86.62%)★
- Marlow Heights CDP (2010, 85.96%)★
- Marlton CDP (2010, 79.58%)
- Mount Rainier (2010, 50.94%)★
- National Harbor CDP (2010, 63.65%)★
- Peppermill Village CDP (2010, 91.56%)
- Silver Hill CDP (2010, 90.59%)★
- Temple Hills CDP (2010, 85.94%)

Population 1,000 to 4,999

- Capitol Heights (2010, 90.39%)
- Fairmount Heights (2010, 87.88%)
- Forest Heights (2010, 75.03%)
- Indian Head (2010, 55.07%)
- Marlboro Meadows CDP (2010, 84.75%)
- Melwood CDP (2010, 64.27%)★
- Morningside (2010, 66.80%)★
- Princess Anne (2010, 67.90%)
- Queenland CDP (2010, 76.88%)★
- Seat Pleasant (2010, 90.66%)
- Springdale CDP (2010, 90.08%)
- Woodmore CDP (2010, 81.71%)

Population 100 to 999

- Butlertown CDP (2010, 57.82%)
- Georgetown CDP (2010, 67.13%)
- Highland Beach (2010, 70.83%)★
- North Brentwood (2010, 60.93%)★
- Pomfret CDP (2010, 50.29%)★★
- Upper Marlboro (2010, 57.53%)★

Population under 100

- Eagle Harbor (2010, 92.06%)

★ African-American majority as of the 2010 Census
★ No longer African-American majority as of the 2020 Census
★ New jurisdiction first appearing in the 2010 Census

== Michigan ==
- Beecher CDP (2010, 68.52%)
- Benton Harbor (2010, 88.65%)
- Benton Heights CDP (2010, 61.53%)
- Benton Charter Township (2010, 51.30%)★
- Buena Vista CDP (2010, 72.73%)
- Buena Vista Charter Township (2010, 60.00%)
- Detroit (2010, 82.18%)
- Fair Plain CDP (2000, 51.42%)★★
- Flint (2010, 56.09%)
- Highland Park (2010, 93.03%)
- Inkster (2010, 72.58%)
- Lathrup Village (2010, 60.88%)
- Muskegon Heights (2010, 77.69%)
- Oak Park (2010, 57.12%)★
- Pontiac (2010, 51.05%)★★
- Royal Oak Charter Township (2010, 94.42%)
- Southfield (2010, 69.95%)

★ African-American majority as of the 2010 Census
★ No longer African-American majority as of the 2020 Census

== Mississippi ==
Population over 100,000

- Jackson (2010, 79.11%)

Population 25,000 to 99,999

- Greenville (2010, 77.76%)
- Hattiesburg (2010, 52.80%)★
- Meridian (2010, 61.26%)

Population 10,000 to 24,999

- Moss Point (2010, 73.32%)
- Natchez (2010, 58.11%)
- Vicksburg (2010, 65.87%)

Population 5,000 to 9,999

Population 1,000 to 4,999

- Alcorn State University CDP (2010, 93.71%)★
- Belzoni (2010, 75.21%)
- Brooksville (2010, 82.50%)
- Bude (2010, 52.49%)
- Centreville (2010, 76.37%)
- Charleston (2010, 72.64%)
- Coldwater (2010, 75.13%)
- Collins (2010, 50.89% )
- Como (2010, 72.71%)
- Derma (2010, 60.98%)
- Drew (2010, 82.72%)
- Durant (2010, 85.22%)
- Edwards (2010, 82.40%)
- Fayette (2010, 97.71%)
- Friars Point (2010, 94.42%)
- Gloster (2010, 64.38%)
- Goodman (2010, 74.17%)
- Hazlehurst (2010, 74.61%)
- Hillsboro CDP (2010, 60.62%)★
- Inverness (2010, 50.74%)★
- Itta Bena (2010, 89.21%)
- Jonestown (Coahoma County) (2010, 97.69%)
- Lambert (2010, 88.34%)
- Lexington (2010, 70.94%)
- Lumberton (2010, 56.18%)
- Macon (2010, 76.99%)
- Magnolia (2010, 66.36%)
- Marks (2010, 66.80%)
- Metcalfe (2010, 94.94%)
- Moorhead (2010, 82.20%)
- Mound Bayou (2010, 98.04%)
- Newton (2010, 62.02%)
- North Tunica CDP (2010, 95.36%)
- Okolona (2010, 69.80%)
- Pickens (2010, 86.69%)
- Port Gibson (2010, 84.24%)
- Rolling Fork (2010, 72.75%)
- Rosedale (2010, 86.55%)
- Ruleville (2010, 85.30%)
- Sardis (2010, 62.24%)
- Shannon (2010, 53.79%)
- Shaw (2010, 93.03%)
- Shelby (2010, 94.35%)
- Summit (2010, 75.01%)
- Sunflower (2010, 86.28%)
- Tchula (2010, 96.71%)
- Terry (2010, 59.08%)
- Tutwiler (2010, 53.61%)
- Verona (2010, 69.66%)
- Walls (2010, 60.84%)★
- Woodville (2010, 75.09%)

Population 100 to 999

- Alligator (2010, 82.21%)
- Anguilla (2010, 77.82%)
- Arcola (2010, 92.24%)
- Artesia (2010, 84.55%)
- Benoit (2010, 81.34%)
- Beulah (2010, 91.09%)
- Bogue Chitto CDP (Lincoln County) (2010, 53.07%)★
- Bolton (2010, 73.19%)
- Cary (2010, 63.90%)
- Coahoma (2010, 99.20%)
- Coffeeville (2010, 55.36%)
- Crawford (2010, 89.70%)
- Crenshaw (2010, 77.06%)
- Crosby (2010, 79.56%)
- Cruger (2010, 84.72%)
- De Kalb (2010, 66.41%)★
- Duck Hill (2010, 67.35%)
- Duncan (2010, 72.81%)
- Falcon (2010, 95.21%)
- Glendora (2010, 96.69%)
- Gunnison (2000, 87.83%)
- Heidelberg (2000, 80.22%)
- Isola (2010, 79.94%)
- Kilmichael (2010, 61.37%)
- Lake (2010, 50.31%)
- Lula (2010, 77.85%)
- Maben (2010, 60.39%)
- Mayersville (2010, 89.21%)
- Merigold (2010, 50.34%)
- Morgan City (2010, 79.61%)
- Mount Olive (2010, 55.09%)
- Oakland (2010, 74.95%)
- Pace (2010, 82.12%)
- Renova (2010, 94.46%)
- Roxie (2010, 60.97%)
- Schlater (2010, 68.71%)
- Scooba (2010, 65.16%)
- Shubuta (2010, 78.24%)
- Shuqualak (2010, 78.24%)
- Sidon (2010, 93.71%)
- Silver City (2010, 72.40%)
- Sledge (2010, 89.17%)
- State Line (2010, 57.17%)
- Utica (2010, 64.02%)
- Vaiden (2010 64.99%)
- Webb (2010, 83.89%)
- Weir (2010, 56.64%)
- Winstonville (2010, 99.48%)

★ No longer African-American majority as of the 2020 Census
★ New jurisdiction first appearing in the 2010 Census
★ African-American majority as of the 2010 Census

== Missouri ==
Population over 10,000

- Bellefontaine Neighbors (2010, 72.50%)★
- Berkeley (2010, 81.44%)
- Ferguson (2010, 67.22%)
- Jennings (2010, 89.54%)
- Old Jamestown CDP (53.45%)★

Population 5,000 to 9,999

- Black Jack (2010, 80.76%)
- Charleston (2010, 50.16%)★
- Dellwood (2010, 78.95%)
- Glasgow Village (2010, 81.53%)★
- Normandy (2010, 69.39%)

Population 1,000 to 4,999

- Bel-Ridge (2010, 82.57%)
- Castle Point CDP (2010, 92.88%)
- Cool Valley (2010, 84.45%)
- Country Club Hills (2010, 90.89%)
- Hanley Hills (2010, 84.96%)
- Hillsdale (2010, 94.93%)
- Moline Acres (2010, 91.65%)
- Northwoods (2010, 93.87%)
- Pagedale (2010, 92.98%)
- Pine Lawn (2010, 95.85%)
- Riverview (2010, 69.71%)★
- Velda City (2010, 95.28%)
- Vinita Park (2010, 64.73%)
- Wellston (2010, 95.11%)

Population 100 to 999

- Beverly Hills (2010, 92.33%)
- Flordell Hills (2010, 90.51%)
- Glen Echo Park (2010, 90.63%)
- Greendale (2010, 67.59%)
- Hayti Heights (2010, 98.08%)
- Haywood City (2010, 88.83%)
- Homestown (2010, 95.36%)
- Howardville (2010, 91.91%)
- Kinloch (2010, 94.63%)
- Norwood Court (2010, 93.95%)
- Pasadena Hills (2010, 67.53%)
- Pasadena Park (2010, 60.43%)
- Uplands Park (2010, 95.73%)
- Velda Village Hills (2010, 99.48%)
- Vinita Terrace (2010, 72.92%)★
- Wilson City (2010, 97.39%)

Population under 100

- North Lilbourn (2010, 85.71%)
- Penermon (2010, 87.50%)
- Pinhook (2010, 96.67%)

★ Merged into the city of Vinita Park in 2016
★ African-American majority as of the 2010 Census
★ New jurisdiction first appearing in the 2010 Census

== New Jersey ==
Population over 50,000

- East Orange (2010, 86.67%)
- Irvington (2010, 83.98%)

Population 25,000 to 49,999

- Orange Township (2010, 69.91%)
- Willingboro Township (2010, 70.58%)

Population 10,000 to 24,999

- Hillside (2010, 51.82%)★
- Roselle (2010, 52.87%)★

Population 5,000 to 9,999

- Salem (2010, 59.99%)

Population under 5,000

- Lawnside (2010, 87.33%)

★ No longer African-American majority as of the 2020 Census
★ African-American majority as of the 2010 Census

== New York ==
- Fairview CDP (Westchester County) (2010, 56.41%)★
- Hillcrest CDP (Rockland County) (2010, 53.78%)★★
- Lakeview CDP (2010, 78.34%)
- Mount Vernon (2010, 61.26%)
- North Amityville CDP (2010, 56.41%)★
- Roosevelt CDP (2010, 60.73%)★
- South Floral Park (2010, 55.05%)★
- Wheatley Heights CDP (2010, 52.65%)★
- Wyandanch CDP (2010, 62.90%)★

★ No longer African-American majority as of the 2020 Census
★ African-American majority as of the 2010 Census

== North Carolina ==
Population over 50,000

- Rocky Mount (2010, 61.01%)

Population 25,000 to 49,999

- Goldsboro (2010, 53.77%)

Population 10,000 to 24,999 people

- Elizabeth City (2010, 53.67%)
- Henderson (2010, 63.43%)
- Kinston (2010, 67.69%)

Population 5,000 to 9,999

- Ahoskie (2010, 66.42%)
- Brogden CDP (2010, 53.59%)★

Population 1,000 to 4,999

- Belhaven (2010, 55.09%)★
- Fair Bluff (2010, 63.62%)
- Green Level (2010, 54.48%)★
- Mount Olive (2010, 50.25%)★
- Murfreesboro (2010, 50.23%)★
- Navassa (2010, 62.59%)
- Pinetops (2010, 65.21%)
- Plymouth (2010, 68.26%)
- Polkton (2010, 60.77%)
- Princeville (2010, 96.30%)
- Robersonville (2010, 66.26%)
- Rowland (2010, 70.20%)
- Scotland Neck (2010, 67.95%)
- Sharpsburg (2010, 58.65%)
- South Rosemary CDP (2010, 55.11%)★
- Weldon (2010, 70.57%)
- Windsor (2010, 62.37%)

Population 100 to 999

- Ansonville (2010, 69.26%)
- Aulander (2010, 54.97%)★★
- Bolton (2010, 68.45%)
- Bowmore CDP (2010, 54.37%)★
- Brunswick (2010, 56.21%)
- Cofield (2010, 82.08%)
- Conetoe (2010, 75.85%)
- East Arcadia (2010, 89.32%)
- Hamilton (2010, 59.56%)
- Kelford (2010, 75.70%)
- Kingstown (2010, 89.13%)
- Lewiston Woodville (2010, 81.60%)
- Light Oak CDP (2010, 73.23%)
- Middleburg (2010, 63.91%)
- Morven (2010, 74.56%)
- Northwest (2010, 56.01%)
- Oak City (2010, 58.99%)★
- Parmele (2010, 91.37%)
- Powellsville (2010, 59.42%)★
- Roper (2010, 78.40%)
- Seaboard (2010, 74.53%)
- Silver City CDP (2010, 89.80%)
- South Weldon CDP (2010, 77.73%)
- Whitakers (2010, 69.35%)
- Winton (2010, 69.70%)

Population less than 100

- Hassell (2010, 58.33%)

★ No longer African-American majority as of the 2020 Census
★ African-American majority as of the 2010 Census

== Ohio ==
Population over 400,000

- Cleveland (2010, 52.47%)★

Population 25,000 to 50,000

- Euclid (2010, 52.17%)★

Population 10,000 to 24,999

- Bedford Heights (2010, 76.34%)
- East Cleveland (2010, 92.65%)
- Forest Park (2010, 64.57%)
- Maple Heights (2010, 67.78%)★
- Trotwood (2010, 67.96%)
- Warrensville Heights (2010, 92.67%)

Population 1,000 to 4,999

- Golf Manor (2010, 72.20%)
- Highland Hills (2010, 73.98%)
- Lincoln Heights (2010, 95.31%)
- North Randall (2010, 86.17%)
- Oakwood (Cuyahoga County) (2010, 64.28%)
- Silverton (2010, 51.29%)★
- Skyline Acres CDP (2010, 81.42%)
- Wilberforce CDP (2010, 81.11%)
- Woodlawn (2010, 66.88%)

Population 100 to 999

- Urbancrest (2010, 54.48%)
- Twinsburg Heights CDP (2010, 81.41%)★
- Woodmere (2020, 60.63%)★

★ New jurisdiction first appearing in the 2010 Census
★ No longer African-American majority as of the 2020 Census
★ African-American majority as of the 2010 Census

== Oklahoma ==
Population 1,000 to 4,999

- Langston (2010, 92.34%)
- Spencer (2010, 56.01%)
- Forest Park (2010, 73.05%)

Population 100 to 999

- Arcadia (2010, 56.68%)★
- Boynton (2010, 52.02%)★
- Fort Coffee (2010, 66.51%)
- Tullahassee (2010, 63.21%)★
- Redbird (2010, 67.88%)★
- Rentiesville (2010, 50.00%)
- Summit (2010, 75.54%)
- Taft (2010, 82.00%)
- Tatums (2010, 78.15%)

Population under 100

- Clearview (2010, 75.00%)
- Meridian (Logan County) (2010, 76.32%)

★ No longer African-American majority as of the 2020 Census

== Pennsylvania ==
- Chester (2010, 73.01%)
- Chester Township (2010, 76.90%)
- Colwyn (2010, 79.50%)
- Darby (2010, 77.95%)
- East Lansdowne (2010, 54.42%) ★
- Harrisburg (2010, 53.71%) ★★
- Homestead (2010, 58.42%)
- Rankin (2010, 76.77%)
- Sharon Hill (2010, 59.51%)★
- Wilkinsburg (2010, 66.00%)
- Yeadon (2010, 87.74%)

★ African-American majority as of the 2010 Census
★ No longer African-American majority as of the 2020 Census

== South Carolina ==
Population 10,000 to 25,000

- Dentsville CDP (2010, 68.29%)
- Gantt CDP (2010, 58.75%)
- Orangeburg (2010, 74.56%)
- St. Andrews CDP (2010, 65.11%)

Population 5,000 to 9,999

- Dillon (2010, 52.83%)★
- Hollywood (2010, 55.11%)★
- Lancaster (2010, 51.06%)★★
- Woodfield CDP (2010, 50.36%)★

Population 1,000 to 4,999

- Bowman (2010, 69.73%)
- Brookdale CDP (2010, 97.52%)
- Edisto CDP (2010, 73.74%)
- Gadsden CDP (2010, 93.69%)★
- Heath Springs (2010, 52.91%)★
- Holly Hill (2010, 54.74%)★
- Hopkins CDP (2010, 81.89%)★
- Judson CDP (2010, 58.83%)★
- Pamplico (2010, 54.81%)★
- Ridgeville (2010, 63.77%)
- South Sumter CDP (2010, 88.22%)
- Timmonsville (2010, 81.42%)
- Wagener (2010, 63.61%)
- Wilkinson Heights CDP (2010, 91.94%)
- Yemassee (2010, 53.46%)

Population 100 to 999

- Atlantic Beach (2010, 54.19%)★
- Carlisle (2010, 87.84%)
- Clarks Hill CDP (2010, 78.48%)
- Clio (2010, 64.19%)
- Cokesbury CDP (2010, 74.88%)
- Cross Hill (2010, 58.97%)
- Eastover (2010, 92.37%)
- Elko (2010, 58.55%)
- Furman (2010, 72.80%)
- Gifford (2010, 94.10%)
- Greeleyville (2010, 67.35%)
- Lane (2010, 90.55%)
- Lynchburg (2010, 83.91%)
- Mayesville (2010, 82.76%)
- Mount Carmel CDP (2010, 88.89%)
- Norway (2010, 54.01%)★
- Pinewood (2010, 59.67%)
- Promised Land CDP (2010, 94.13%)
- Quinby (2010, 68.24%)
- Richburg (2010, 66.18%)
- Ridge Spring (2010, 59.02%)
- Rowesville (2010, 57.57%)★
- Rembert CDP (2010, 65.69%)
- Santee (2010, 65.35%)
- Scotia (2010, 71.16%)
- Scranton (2010, 58.26%)
- Sellers (2010, 79.00%)
- Shiloh CDP (Sumter County) (2010, 53.74%)★
- Society Hill (2010, 51.15%)★
- Stuckey (2010, 80.82%)
- Vance (2010, 79.41%)
- Waterloo (2010, 52.41%)
- Willington CDP (2010, 85.92%)
- Woodford (2010, 52.43%)★★

Population under 100

- Jenkinsville (2010, 100.00%)★

★ New jurisdiction first appearing in the 2010 Census
★ African-American majority as of the 2010 Census
★ No longer African-American majority as of the 2020 Census

== Tennessee ==
Population over 500,000

- Memphis (2010, 63.08%)

Population 10,000 to 24,999

- Brownsville (2010, 64.43%)

Population 5,000 to 9,999

- Bolivar (2010, 61.20%)
- Ripley (2010, 53.43%)★

Population 1,000 to 5,999

- Mason (2010, 63.02%)
- Whiteville (2010, 60.05%)

Population under 1,000

- Gates (2010, 58.11%)★
- Henning (2010, 75.24%)
- Moscow (2010, 55.94%)★
- Stanton (2010, 69.47%)

★ African-American majority as of the 2010 Census
★ No longer African-American majority as of the 2020 Census

== Texas ==
Population over 25,000

- Cedar Hill (2010, 51.40%)★
- DeSoto (2010, 67.97%)★
- Lancaster (2010, 68.28%)

Population 10,000 to 24,999

- Fresno CDP (2010, 58.87%)★

Population 5,000 to 9,999

- Prairie View (2010, 87.59%)

Population 1,000 to 4,999

- Barrett CDP (2010, 76.99%)★
- San Augustine (2010, 51.80%)

Population 100 to 999

- Ames (2010, 83.65%)
- Cuney (2010, 70.71%)
- Easton (2010, 60.39%)
- Goodlow (2010, 87.00%)
- Kendleton (2010, 82.63%)
- Lakeport (2010, 52.87%)★
- Moore Station (2010, 81.59%)
- Seven Oaks (2010, 69.37%)★

Population under 100

- Domino (2010, 65.59%)
- Toco (2010, 72.00%)

★ African-American majority as of the 2010 Census
★ No longer African-American majority as of the 2020 Census

== Virginia ==
Population over 100,000

- Richmond (2010, 50.08%)★

Population over 50,000

- Portsmouth (2010, 52.68%)

Population 25,000 to 49,999

- Petersburg (2010, 78.41%)

Population 10,000 to 24,999

- East Highland Park CDP (2010, 84.21%)
- Highland Springs CDP (2010, 65.58%)

Population 5,000 to 9,999

- Chamberlayne CDP (2010, 58.10%)★
- Emporia (2010, 62.17%)
- Ettrick CDP (2010, 77.22%)
- Franklin (2010, 56.71%)
- Montrose CDP (2010, 65.93%)★

Population 1,000 to 4,999

- Lawrenceville (2010, 76.22%)
- Rushmere CDP (2010, 60.12%)★
- Waverly (2010, 64.68%)

Population 100 to 999

- Bayside CDP (Accomack County) (2010, 95.00%)★
- Boston CDP (Accomack County) (2010, 88.69%)★
- Camptown CDP (2010, 57.05%)★
- Cats Bridge CDP (2010, 84.72%)★
- Charles City CDP (2010, 54.14%)★
- Dendron (2010, 57.35%)
- Laurel Park CDP (2010, 61.33%)
- Makemie Park CDP (2010, 88.39%)★
- Metompkin CDP (2010, 71.32%)★
- Nelsonia CDP (2010, 53.92%)★★
- Pastoria CDP (2010, 53.00%)★★
- Sandy Level CDP (2010, 62.19%)
- Savageville CDP (2010, 77.71%)★
- Southampton Meadows CDP (2010, 85.30%)★
- Sussex CDP (2010, 51.95%)★★
- Wakefield (2010, 50.59%)★
- Warfield CDP (2010, 74.78%)★
- Whitesville CDP (2010, 63.01%)★

Population under 100

- Savage Town CDP (2010, 92.31%)★

★ New jurisdiction first appearing in the 2010 Census
★ African-American majority as of the 2010 Census
★ No longer African-American majority as of the 2020 Census

== West Virginia ==
Population under 1,000

- Keystone (2010, 64.89%)
- Kimball (2010, 57.22%)
- Northfork (2010, 56.88%)

== Counties ==
=== Alabama ===
- Bullock County (2010, 69.97%)
- Dallas County (2010, 69.18%)
- Greene County (2010, 81.25%)
- Hale County (2010, 58.79%)
- Lowndes County (2010, 73.31%)
- Macon County (2010, 82.19%)
- Marengo County (2010, 51.54%)
- Montgomery County (2010, 54.47%)★
- Perry County (2010, 68.40%)
- Sumter County (2010, 74.71%)
- Wilcox County (2010, 72.15%)

=== Arkansas ===
- Chicot County (2010, 53.79%)
- Crittenden County (2010, 50.99%)★
- Jefferson County (2010, 54.87%)★
- Lee County (2010, 55.07%)
- Phillips County (2010, 62.75%)
- St. Francis County (2010, 51.54%)★

=== Florida ===
- Gadsden County (2010, 55.79%)

=== Georgia ===
- Bibb County (2010, 51.91%)★
- Calhoun County (2010, 61.13%)
- Clay County (2010, 60.32%)
- Clayton County (2010, 65.15%)
- DeKalb County (2010, 53.62%)
- Dougherty County (2010, 66.83%)
- Hancock County (2010, 73.80%)
- Jefferson County (2010, 54.26%)
- Macon County (2010, 60.39%)
- Randolph County (2010, 61.50%)
- Richmond County (2010, 53.54%)★
- Sumter County (2010, 51.48%)★
- Talbot County (2010, 58.83%)
- Taliaferro County (2010, 59.64%)
- Terrell County (2010, 61.01%)
- Warren County (2010, 61.43%)
- Washington County (2010, 52.50%)

=== Louisiana ===
- East Carroll Parish (2010, 68.62%)
- Madison Parish (2010, 60.84%)
- Orleans Parish (2010, 59.58%)
- St. Helena Parish (2010, 53.24%)
- St. James Parish (2010, 50.43%)★★
- St. John the Baptist Parish (2010, 53.14%)★
- Tensas Parish (2010, 56.30%)

=== Maryland ===
- Prince George's County (2010, 63.52%)

=== Mississippi ===
- Adams County
- Bolivar County
- Claiborne County
- Clay County
- Coahoma County
- Copiah County
- Hinds County (2010, 68.83%)
- Holmes County
- Humphreys County
- Issaquena County
- Jasper County
- Jefferson County
- Jefferson Davis County
- Kemper County
- Leflore County
- Noxubee County
- Pike County (2010, 51.33%)★
- Quitman County
- Sharkey County
- Sunflower County
- Tallahatchie County
- Tunica County
- Washington County
- Wilkinson County
- Yazoo County

=== North Carolina ===
- Bertie County (2010, 62.27%)
- Edgecombe County (2010, 57.15%)
- Halifax County (2010, 53.00%)
- Hertford County (2010, 60.18% )
- Northampton County (2010, 58.13%)
- Warren County (2010, 52.03%)★

=== South Carolina ===
- Allendale County
- Bamberg County
- Fairfield County
- Hampton County
- Lee County
- Marion County
- Marlboro County (2010, 50.64%)★
- Orangeburg County (2010, 61.93%)
- Williamsburg County

=== Tennessee ===
- Haywood County (2010, 50.20%)
- Shelby County (2010, 51.90%)★

=== Virginia ===
- Brunswick County (2010, 57.04%)
- Greensville County (2010, 59.58%)
- Sussex County (2010, 57.88%)

★ No longer African-American majority as of the 2020 Census
★ African-American majority as of the 2010 Census

== See also ==
- List of U.S. communities with African-American majority populations in 2000
- List of U.S. communities with Hispanic- or Latino-majority in the 2010 census
