= List of U.S. communities with African-American majority populations =

List of U.S. communities with African-American majority populations may refer to:

- List of U.S. communities with African-American majority populations in 2000
- List of U.S. communities with African-American majority populations in 2010
- List of U.S. communities with African-American majority populations in 2020
