= Melrose Park (Fort Lauderdale) =

Melrose Park, Florida
- neighborhood
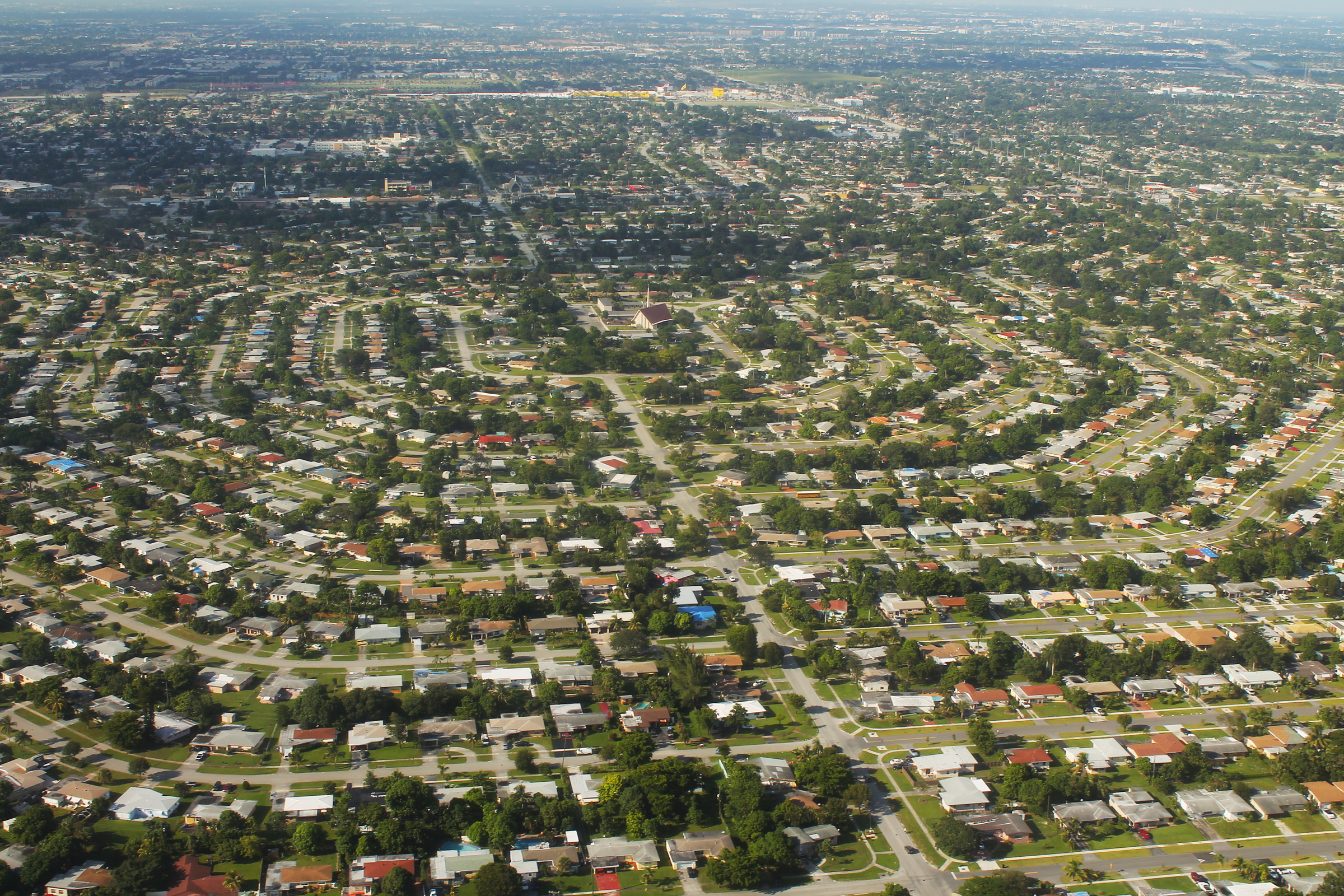
- An aerial view of Melrose Park

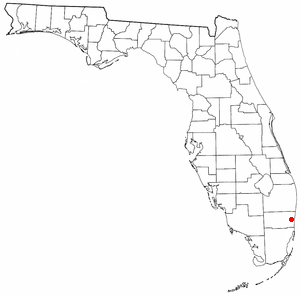
- Location of Melrose Park, Florida
- Coordinates: 26°6′50″N 80°11′37″W
- Country: United States
- State: Florida
- County: Broward

Area
  - Total: 0.89 sq mi (2.3 km^{2})
  - Land: 0.89 sq mi (2.3 km^{2})
  - Water: 0 sq mi (0.0 km^{2})
- Elevation: 6.6 ft (2 m)

Population (2000)
  - Total: 7,114
  - Density: 7,877/sq mi (3,041.4/km^{2})
- Time zone: UTC-5 (Eastern (EST))
  - Summer (DST): UTC-4 (EDT)
- FIPS code: 12-44125
- GNIS feature ID: 0301161

Melrose Park is a former census-designated place in Broward County, Florida, United States. The population was 7,114 at the 2000 census. On September 15, 2002, Melrose Park was annexed to the city of Fort Lauderdale, and it is now a neighborhood.

== Geography ==
Melrose Park is located at 26°6′50″N 80°11′37″W (26.113764, -80.193587).

According to the United States Census Bureau, the CDP has a total area of 2.3 km^{2} (0.89 sq mi), all land.

== Demographics ==
Melrose Park CDP, Florida – Racial and ethnic composition Note: the US Census treats Hispanic/Latino as an ethnic category. This table excludes Latinos from the racial categories and assigns them to a separate category. Hispanics/Latinos may be of any race.
Race / Ethnicity (NH = Non-Hispanic)	Pop 2000	2000
White alone (NH)	576	8.10%
Black or African American alone (NH)	5,836	82.04%
Native American or Alaska Native alone (NH)	7	0.10%
Asian alone (NH)	56	0.79%
Native Hawaiian or Pacific Islander alone (NH)	2	0.03%
Other race alone (NH)	39	0.55%
Mixed race or Multiracial (NH)	321	4.51%
Hispanic or Latino (any race)	277	3.89%
Total	7,114	100.00%

As of the census of 2000, there were 7,114 people, 1,975 households, and 1,617 families residing in the CDP. The population density was 3,051.9 people/km^{2} (7,904 people/mi^{2}). There were 2,072 housing units at an average density of 888.9 units/km^{2} (2,302 units/mi^{2}). The racial makeup of the CDP was 10.05% White (8.1% were Non-Hispanic White,) 82.65% African American, 0.10% Native American, 0.79% Asian, 0.03% Pacific Islander, 1.62% from other races, and 4.77% from two or more races. Hispanic or Latino of any race were 3.89% of the population.

There were 1,975 households, out of which 44.7% had children under the age of 18 living with them, 51.8% were married couples living together, 23.0% had a female householder with no husband present, and 18.1% were non-families. 13.1% of all households were made up of individuals, and 3.4% had someone living alone who was 65 years of age or older. The average household size was 3.60 and the average family size was 3.92.

In the CDP, the population was spread out, with 32.8% under the age of 18, 10.0% from 18 to 24, 28.5% from 25 to 44, 21.9% from 45 to 64, and 6.9% who were 65 years of age or older. The median age was 32 years. For every 100 females, there were 95.9 males. For every 100 females age 18 and over, there were 90.9 males.

The median income for a household in the CDP was $45,745, and the median income for a family was $46,292. Males had a median income of $29,899 versus $23,327 for females. The per capita income for the CDP was $14,084. About 11.3% of families and 15.7% of the population were below the poverty line, including 24.2% of those under age 18 and 14.0% of those age 65 or over.

As of 2000, English as a first language accounted for 78.34% of residents, and Haitian Creole comprised 16.41% of the population. The other languages included Spanish which was at 3.34%, French was at 1.36%, and Jamaican Creole & (Jamaican) Patois added together, made up 0.52% of all residents.
