= Twinsburg Heights, Ohio =

- CDP
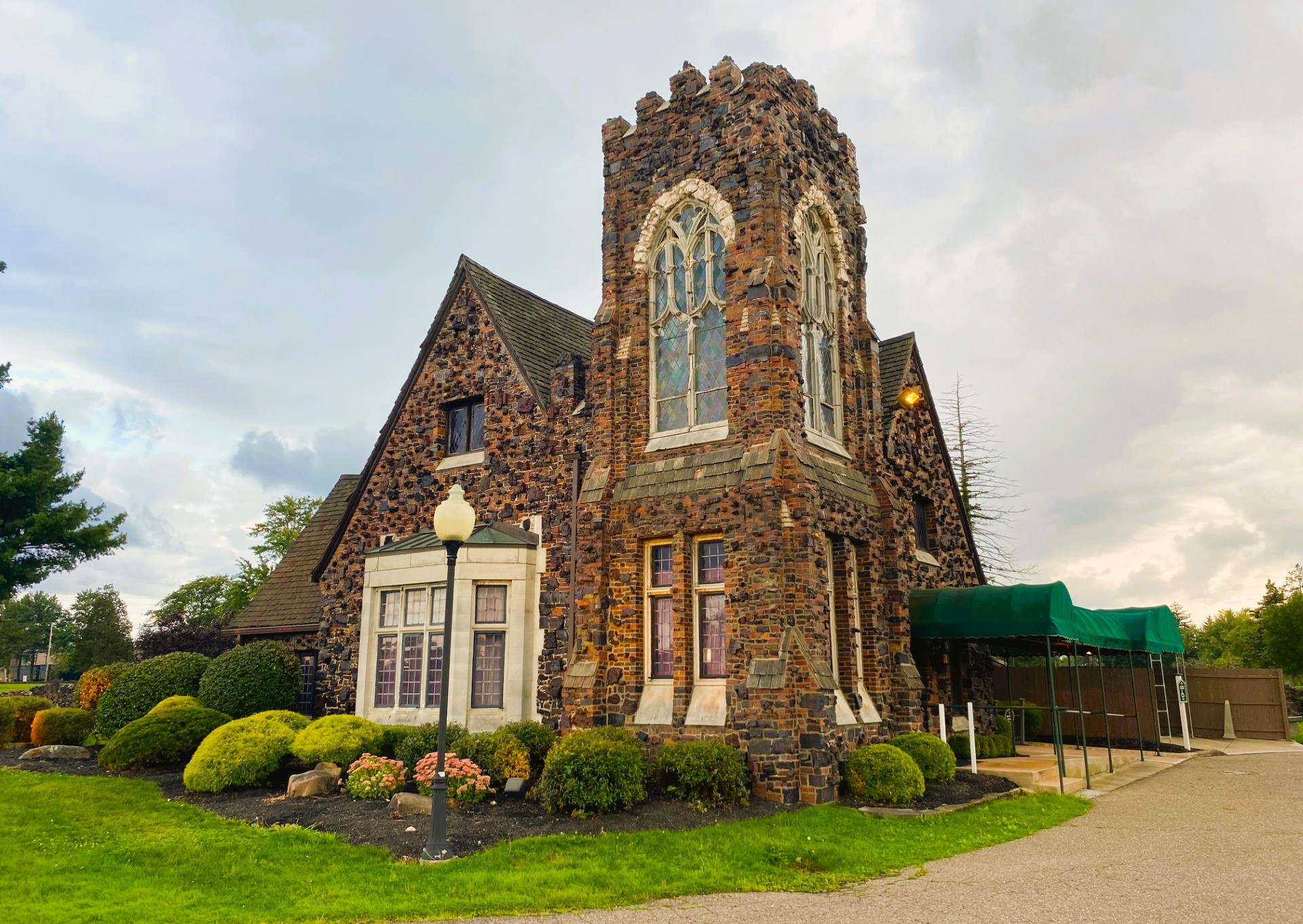
- Interactive map of Twinsburg Heights, Ohio
- Coordinates: 41°18′23″N 81°27′28″W
- Country: United States
- State: Ohio
- County: Summit

Area
  - Total: 0.29 sq mi (0.74 km^{2})
  - Land: 0.29 sq mi (0.74 km^{2})
  - Water: 0 sq mi (0.00 km^{2})
- Elevation: 1,125 ft (343 m)

Population (2020)
  - Total: 999
  - Density: 3,475.8/sq mi (1,342.03/km^{2})
- Time zone: UTC-5 (Eastern (EST))
  - Summer (DST): UTC-4 (EDT)
- FIPS code: 39-78078
- GNIS feature ID: 2633188

Twinsburg Heights is a census-designated place (CDP) in Summit County, Ohio, United States. The population was 999 at the 2020 census.

== Demographics ==
Historical population
Census	Pop.	Note	%±
2010	925		—
2020	999		8.0%
U.S. Decennial Census

Twinsburg Heights first appeared as a census designated place in the 2010 U.S. census.

=== 2020 census ===
Twinsburg Heights CDP, Ohio – Racial and ethnic composition Note: the US Census treats Hispanic/Latino as an ethnic category. This table excludes Latinos from the racial categories and assigns them to a separate category. Hispanics/Latinos may be of any race.
Race / Ethnicity (NH = Non-Hispanic)	Pop 2010	Pop 2020	% 2010	% 2020
White alone (NH)	93	135	10.05%	13.51%
Black or African American alone (NH)	753	741	81.41%	74.17%
Native American or Alaska Native alone (NH)	2	0	0.22%	0.00%
Asian alone (NH)	3	21	0.32%	2.10%
Native Hawaiian or Pacific Islander alone (NH)	0	4	0.00%	0.40%
Other race alone (NH)	5	3	0.54%	0.30%
Mixed race or Multiracial (NH)	54	58	5.84%	5.81%
Hispanic or Latino (any race)	15	37	1.62%	3.70%
Total	925	999	100.00%	100.00%

As of the census of 2010, there were 925 people living in the CDP. The racial makeup of the CDP was 10.1% White, 81.4% African American, 0.02% Native American, 0.03% Asian, 0.5% from other races, and 5.8% from two or more races. Hispanic or Latino of any race were 1.6% of the population.

The median income for a household in the CDP was $49,232. The per capita income for the CDP was $28,398. 61.8% of the population were living below the poverty line.
