= List of West Indian communities in the United States =

Communities in the United States with large West Indian populations.

== Connecticut ==
- Bloomfield, Connecticut
- Blue Hills, Connecticut

== Florida ==
- Carol City, Florida
- Coconut Creek, Florida
- Coral Springs, Florida
- Cutler Bay, Florida
- Fort Lauderdale, Florida
- Hallandale Beach, Florida
- Hialeah, Florida
- Hollywood, Florida
- Homestead, Florida
- Kendall, Florida
- Kissimmee, Florida
- Lake Worth, Florida
- Lauderdale Lakes, Florida
- Lauderhill, Florida
- Little Haiti, Miami, Florida
- Little Havana, Miami, Florida
- Margate, Florida
- Miami, Florida
- Miami Gardens, Florida
- Miramar, Florida
- North Lauderdale, Florida
- North Miami Beach, Florida
- Oakland Park, Florida
- Orlando, Florida
- Pembroke Park, Florida
- Pembroke Pines, Florida
- Plantation, Florida
- Pompano Beach, Florida
- Port Saint Lucie, Florida
- Sunrise, Florida
- Tamarac, Florida
- Tampa, Florida
- West Palm Beach, Florida
- West Park, Florida
- Ybor City, Florida

== Georgia ==
- parts of Atlanta, Georgia
- Clarkston, Georgia
- Lithonia, Georgia
- Stone Mountain, Georgia

== Maryland ==
- Park Heights, Baltimore
- Prince George's County, Maryland

== Massachusetts ==
- Dorchester, Boston
- "Little Jamaica", Boston, Massachusetts
- Mattapan, Boston
- Milton, Massachusetts
- Randolph, Massachusetts
- Somerville, Massachusetts
- Brockton, Massachusetts
- Hyde Park, Massachusetts
- Roxbury, Massachusetts

== New York ==
- Westbury, New York
- Bedford–Stuyvesant, Brooklyn
- Crown Heights, Brooklyn
- East Flatbush, Brooklyn
- Flatbush, Brooklyn
- Canarsie, Brooklyn
- Elmont, New York
- Jamaica, Queens
- Kew Gardens, Queens
- Lakeview, New York
- Laurelton, Queens
- Mount Vernon, New York
- Richmond Hill, Queens
- Roosevelt, New York
- Schenectady, New York
- Springfield Gardens, Queens
- Uniondale, New York
- Valley Stream, New York
- Wakefield, Bronx
- Williamsbridge, Bronx

== Texas ==
- Greater Houston has about 15,000 Jamaicans
