= Penermon, Missouri =

- Village
- Location of Penermon, Missouri
- Coordinates: 36°47′27″N 89°49′48″W
- Country: United States
- State: Missouri
- County: Stoddard

Area
  - Total: 0.21 sq mi (0.55 km^{2})
  - Land: 0.21 sq mi (0.55 km^{2})
  - Water: 0 sq mi (0.00 km^{2})
- Elevation: 295 ft (90 m)

Population (2020)
  - Total: 51
  - Density: 242.0/sq mi (93.42/km^{2})
- Time zone: UTC-6 (Central (CST))
  - Summer (DST): UTC-5 (CDT)
- FIPS code: 29-56900
- GNIS feature ID: 2399649

Penermon is a village in Stoddard County, Missouri, United States. The population was 51 at the 2020 census.

== Geography ==
According to the United States Census Bureau, the village has a total area of 0.21 square miles (0.54 km^{2}), all land.

== Demographics ==
Historical population
Census	Pop.	Note	%±
1980	136		—
1990	94		−30.9%
2000	75		−20.2%
2010	64		−14.7%
2020	51		−20.3%
U.S. Decennial Census

=== 2020 census ===
Penermon village, Missouri – Racial and ethnic composition Note: the US Census treats Hispanic/Latino as an ethnic category. This table excludes Latinos from the racial categories and assigns them to a separate category. Hispanics/Latinos may be of any race.
Race / Ethnicity (NH = Non-Hispanic)	Pop 2000	Pop 2010	Pop 2020	% 2000	% 2010	% 2020
White alone (NH)	12	6	6	16.00%	9.38%	11.76%
Black or African American alone (NH)	63	56	43	84.00%	87.50%	84.31%
Native American or Alaska Native alone (NH)	0	0	1	0.00%	0.00%	1.96%
Asian alone (NH)	0	0	0	0.00%	0.00%	0.00%
Pacific Islander alone (NH)	0	0	0	0.00%	0.00%	0.00%
Other race alone (NH)	0	0	0	0.00%	0.00%	0.00%
Mixed race or Multiracial (NH)	0	2	0	0.00%	3.13%	0.00%
Hispanic or Latino (any race)	0	0	1	0.00%	0.00%	1.96%
Total	75	64	51	100.00%	100.00%	100.00%

=== 2010 census ===
As of the census of 2010, there were 64 people, 33 households, and 16 families living in the village. The population density was 304.8 inhabitants per square mile (117.7/km^{2}). There were 34 housing units at an average density of 161.9 per square mile (62.5/km^{2}). The racial makeup of the village was 9.4% White, 87.5% African American, and 3.1% from two or more races.

There were 33 households, of which 24.2% had children under the age of 18 living with them, 33.3% were married couples living together, 15.2% had a female householder with no husband present, and 51.5% were non-families. 48.5% of all households were made up of individuals, and 24.2% had someone living alone who was 65 years of age or older. The average household size was 1.94 and the average family size was 2.75.

The median age in the village was 45 years. 18.7% of residents were under the age of 18; 9.5% were between the ages of 18 and 24; 21.9% were from 25 to 44; 29.7% were from 45 to 64; and 20.3% were 65 years of age or older. The gender makeup of the village was 50.0% male and 50.0% female.

=== 2000 census ===
As of the census of 2000, there were 75 people, 31 households, and 20 families living in the village. The population density was 358.3 inhabitants per square mile (138.3/km^{2}). There were 37 housing units at an average density of 176.7 per square mile (68.2/km^{2}). The racial makeup of the village was 16.00% White and 84.00% African American.

There were 31 households, out of which 29.0% had children under the age of 18 living with them, 41.9% were married couples living together, 22.6% had a female householder with no husband present, and 32.3% were non-families. 29.0% of all households were made up of individuals, and 22.6% had someone living alone who was 65 years of age or older. The average household size was 2.42 and the average family size was 3.00.

In the village, the population was spread out, with 33.3% under the age of 18, 1.3% from 18 to 24, 26.7% from 25 to 44, 16.0% from 45 to 64, and 22.7% who were 65 years of age or older. The median age was 36 years. For every 100 females, there were 92.3 males. For every 100 females age 18 and over, there were 66.7 males.

The median income for a household in the village was $11,875, and the median income for a family was $38,333. Males had a median income of $27,083 versus $15,625 for females. The per capita income for the village was $10,549. There were 15.0% of families and 25.0% of the population living below the poverty line, including 13.0% of under eighteens and 42.9% of those over 64.

== Education ==
It is in the Richland R-I School District.
