= DeLand Southwest, Florida =

- CDP
- Location in Volusia County and the state of Florida
- Coordinates: 29°00′16″N 81°18′30″W
- Country: United States
- State: Florida
- County: Volusia

Area
  - Total: 0.61 sq mi (1.58 km^{2})
  - Land: 0.61 sq mi (1.58 km^{2})
  - Water: 0 sq mi (0.00 km^{2})
- Elevation: 66 ft (20 m)

Population (2020)
  - Total: 1,056
  - Density: 1,728.6/sq mi (667.43/km^{2})
- Time zone: UTC-5 (Eastern (EST))
  - Summer (DST): UTC-4 (EDT)
- ZIP code: 32720
- Area code: 386
- FIPS code: 12-16937
- GNIS ID: 2402400

DeLand Southwest is an unincorporated census-designated place located in Volusia County, Florida, United States. The population was 1,056 at the 2020 census.

== Geography ==
According to the United States Census Bureau, the CDP has a total area of 0.62 square miles (1.6 km^{2}), all land.

== Demographics ==
Historical population
Census	Pop.	Note	%±
2000	1,169		—
2010	1,052		−10.0%
2020	1,056		0.4%
U.S. Decennial Census

=== Racial and ethnic composition ===
DeLand Southwest, Florida – Racial and ethnic composition Note: the U.S. census treats Hispanic/Latino as an ethnic category. This table excludes Latinos from the racial categories and assigns them to a separate category. Hispanics/Latinos may be of any race.
Race / Ethnicity (NH = Non-Hispanic)	Pop 2000	Pop 2010	Pop 2020	% 2000	% 2010	2020
White alone (NH)	249	152	144	21.30%	14.45%	13.64%
Black or African American alone (NH)	823	730	640	70.40%	69.39%	60.61%
Native American or Alaska Native alone (NH)	1	7	3	0.09%	0.67%	0.28%
Asian alone (NH)	5	3	9	0.43%	0.29%	0.85%
Pacific Islander alone (NH)	0	0	0	0.00%	0.00%	0.00%
Some Other Race alone (NH)	0	2	10	0.00%	0.19%	0.95%
Mixed Race or Multi-Racial (NH)	7	9	24	0.60%	0.86%	2.27%
Hispanic or Latino (any race)	84	149	226	7.19%	14.16%	21.40%
Total	1,169	1,052	1,056	100.00%	100.00%	100.00%

=== 2020 census ===
As of the 2020 census, DeLand Southwest had a population of 1,056. The median age was 38.9 years. 23.4% of residents were under the age of 18 and 17.0% of residents were 65 years of age or older. For every 100 females there were 86.6 males, and for every 100 females age 18 and over there were 83.4 males age 18 and over.

100.0% of residents lived in urban areas, while 0.0% lived in rural areas.

There were 405 households in DeLand Southwest, of which 31.6% had children under the age of 18 living in them. Of all households, 23.5% were married-couple households, 24.4% were households with a male householder and no spouse or partner present, and 42.2% were households with a female householder and no spouse or partner present. About 31.1% of all households were made up of individuals and 13.6% had someone living alone who was 65 years of age or older.

There were 456 housing units, of which 11.2% were vacant. The homeowner vacancy rate was 3.0% and the rental vacancy rate was 8.9%.

=== 2000 census ===
As of the census of 2000, there were 1,169 people, 387 households, and 258 families residing in the CDP. The population density was 716.4 people/km^{2} (1,855 people/mi^{2}). There were 459 housing units at an average density of 281.3 units/km^{2} (729 units/mi^{2}). The racial makeup of the town was 25.15% White, 70.66% African American, 0.09% Native American, 0.43% Asian, 2.57% from other races, and 1.11% from two or more races. Hispanic or Latino of any race were 7.19% of the population.

There were 387 households, out of which 29.5% had children under the age of 18 living with them, 33.3% were married couples living together, 30.0% had a female householder with no husband present, and 33.1% were non-families. 26.6% of all households were made up of individuals, and 8.0% had someone living alone who was 65 years of age or older. The average household size was 2.73 and the average family size was 3.32.

In the CDP, the population was spread out, with 26.8% under the age of 18, 7.8% from 18 to 24, 23.8% from 25 to 44, 21.3% from 45 to 64, and 20.4% who were 65 years of age or older. The median age was 38 years. For every 100 females, there were 79.0 males. For every 100 females age 18 and over, there were 68.8 males.

The median income for a household in the CDP was $13,090, and the median income for a family was $18,929. Males had a median income of $17,083 versus $17,417 for females. The per capita income for the town was $8,373. About 41.9% of families and 45.7% of the population were below the poverty line, including 50.9% of those under age 18 and 43.7% of those age 65 or over.
