= McMullen, Alabama =

- Town
- Location of McMullen in Pickens County, Alabama.
- Coordinates: 33°08′53″N 88°10′33″W
- Country: United States
- State: Alabama
- County: Pickens

Area
  - Total: 0.11 sq mi (0.28 km^{2})
  - Land: 0.11 sq mi (0.28 km^{2})
  - Water: 0 sq mi (0.00 km^{2})
- Elevation: 187 ft (57 m)

Population (2020)
  - Total: 32
  - Density: 292.1/sq mi (112.77/km^{2})
- Time zone: UTC-6 (Central (CST))
  - Summer (DST): UTC-5 (CDT)
- ZIP code: 35442
- Area codes: 205, 659
- FIPS code: 01-45640
- GNIS feature ID: 2406137

McMullen is a town in Pickens County, Alabama, United States. It incorporated around 1976. A series of natural disasters has caused the population to dwindle. As of 2010, it was the smallest incorporated town in the state of Alabama. It was overtaken by Oak Hill in 2020. The population was 32 at the 2020 United States census, up from 10 in 2010.

== Geography ==
According to the United States Census Bureau, the town has a total area of 0.1 square miles (0.26 km^{2}), all land.

== Demographics ==
Historical population
Census	Pop.	Note	%±
1970	73		—
1980	164		124.7%
1990	112		−31.7%
2000	66		−41.1%
2010	10		−84.8%
2020	32		220.0%
U.S. Decennial Census

=== Racial and ethnic composition ===
McMullen town, Alabama – Racial and ethnic composition Note: the US Census treats Hispanic/Latino as an ethnic category. This table excludes Latinos from the racial categories and assigns them to a separate category. Hispanics/Latinos may be of any race.
Race / Ethnicity (NH = Non-Hispanic)	Pop 2000	Pop 2010	Pop 2020	% 2000	% 2010	% 2020
White alone (NH)	0	1	0	0.00%	10.00%	0.00%
Black or African American alone (NH)	66	6	28	100.00%	60.00%	87.50%
Native American or Alaska Native alone (NH)	0	0	0	0.00%	0.00%	0.00%
Asian alone (NH)	0	0	0	0.00%	0.00%	0.00%
Native Hawaiian or Pacific Islander alone (NH)	0	0	0	0.00%	0.00%	0.00%
Other race alone (NH)	0	0	0	0.00%	0.00%	0.00%
Mixed race or Multiracial (NH)	0	0	2	0.00%	0.00%	6.25%
Hispanic or Latino (any race)	0	3	2	0.00%	30.00%	6.25%
Total	66	10	32	100.00%	100.00%	100.00%

=== 2020 census ===
As of the 2020 United States census, there were 32 people, 6 households, and 0 families residing in the town.

=== 2010 census ===
At the 2010 census, there were 10 people living in the town. 60% were African American, 10% White, and 30% were Hispanic or Latino.

=== 2000 census ===
At the 2000 census, there were 66 people, 31 households, and 19 families living in the town. The population density was 544.0 inhabitants per square mile (210.0/km^{2}). There were 31 housing units at an average density of 255.5 per square mile (98.6/km^{2}). The racial makeup of the town was 100.00% African American.

Of the 31 households 16.1% had children under the age of 18 living with them, 32.3% were married couples living together, 29.0% had a female householder with no husband present, and 38.7% were non-families. 38.7% of households were one person and 12.9% were one person aged 65 or older. The average household size was 2.13 and the average family size was 2.74.

The age distribution was 19.7% under the age of 18, 6.1% from 18 to 24, 25.8% from 25 to 44, 22.7% from 45 to 64, and 25.8% 65 or older. The median age was 44 years. For every 100 females, there were 53.5 males. For every 100 females age 18 and over, there were 51.4 males.

The median household income was $30,000 and the median family income was $33,500. Males had a median income of $21,250 versus $16,250 for females. The per capita income for the town was $10,458. There were 8.3% of families and 13.4% of the population living below the poverty line, including 10.0% of those under 18 and 4.3% of those over 64.
