= Lincoln Park, Georgia =

- Unincorporated community Census-designated place
- Location in Upson County and the state of Georgia
- Coordinates: 32°52′4″N 84°19′55″W
- Country: United States
- State: Georgia
- County: Upson

Area
  - Total: 0.86 sq mi (2.24 km^{2})
  - Land: 0.86 sq mi (2.22 km^{2})
  - Water: 0.0077 sq mi (0.02 km^{2})
- Elevation: 715 ft (218 m)

Population (2020)
  - Total: 817
  - Density: 953.3/sq mi (368.08/km^{2})
- Time zone: UTC-5 (Eastern (EST))
  - Summer (DST): UTC-4 (EDT)
- ZIP code: 30286
- Area code: 706
- FIPS code: 13-46524
- GNIS feature ID: 0332218

Lincoln Park is an unincorporated community and census-designated place (CDP) in Upson County, Georgia, United States. As of the 2020 census, Lincoln Park had a population of 817.

== Geography ==
Lincoln Park is located at 32°52′4″N 84°19′55″W (32.867666, -84.332046).

According to the United States Census Bureau, the CDP has a total area of 1.0 square mile (2.6 km^{2}), all land.

== Demographics ==
Historical population
Census	Pop.	Note	%±
1950	1,575		—
1960	1,840		16.8%
1970	1,852		0.7%
1980	1,755		−5.2%
2000	1,122		—
2010	833		−25.8%
2020	817		−1.9%
U.S. Decennial Census; 1850-1870 1870-1880; 1890-1910 1920-1930; 1940 1950 1960; 1970 1980 1990; 2000 2010 2020

Lincoln Park was first listed as an unincorporated place in the 1950 U.S. census and designated a CDP in the 1980 United States census. It was not listed in the 1990 U.S. census after a portion of the CDP was annexed to Thomaston. It reappeared as a CDP in the 2000 U.S. census.

Lincoln Park CDP, Georgia – racial and ethnic composition Note: the US Census treats Hispanic/Latino as an ethnic category. This table excludes Latinos from the racial categories and assigns them to a separate category. Hispanics/Latinos may be of any race.
Race / Ethnicity (NH = Non-Hispanic)	Pop 2000	Pop 2010	Pop 2020	% 2000	% 2010	% 2020
White alone (NH)	50	61	65	4.46%	7.32%	7.96%
Black or African American alone (NH)	1,058	759	720	94.30%	91.12%	88.13%
Native American or Alaska Native alone (NH)	1	2	1	0.09%	0.24%	0.12%
Asian alone (NH)	3	4	1	0.27%	0.48%	0.12%
Native Hawaiian or Pacific Islander alone (NH)	0	1	0	0.00%	0.12%	0.00%
Other race alone (NH)	0	2	10	0.00%	0.24%	1.22%
Mixed race or multiracial (NH)	1	2	11	0.09%	0.24%	1.35%
Hispanic or Latino (any race)	9	2	9	0.80%	0.24%	1.10%
Total	1,122	833	817	100.00%	100.00%	100.00%
