= Kingstown, North Carolina =

- Town
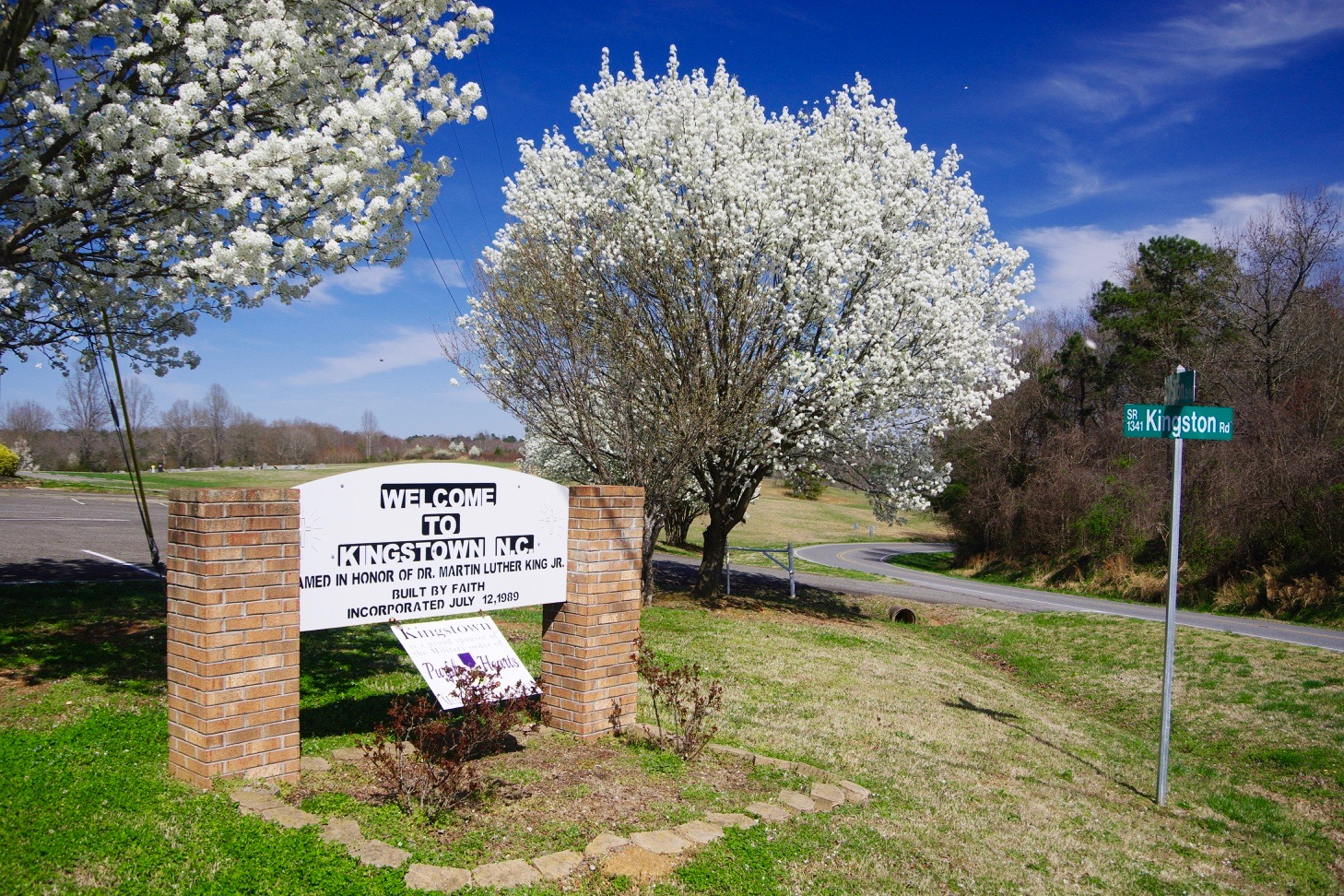
- Welcome sign

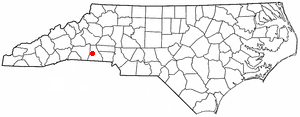
- Location of Kingstown, North Carolina
- Coordinates: 35°22′06″N 81°37′45″W
- Country: United States
- State: North Carolina
- County: Cleveland

Area
  - Total: 1.76 sq mi (4.56 km^{2})
  - Land: 1.76 sq mi (4.56 km^{2})
  - Water: 0 sq mi (0.00 km^{2})
- Elevation: 922 ft (281 m)

Population (2020)
  - Total: 656
  - Density: 372.6/sq mi (143.87/km^{2})
- Time zone: UTC-5 (Eastern (EST))
  - Summer (DST): UTC-4 (EDT)
- ZIP code: 28150
- Area code: 704
- FIPS code: 37-35890
- GNIS feature ID: 2405951
- Website: https://kingstownnc.com/

Kingstown is a town in Cleveland County, North Carolina, United States. As of the 2020 census, Kingstown had a population of 656.

== History ==
Named in honor of Martin Luther King Jr., Kingstown was incorporated in 1989. The town was originally known as "Kingston," but adopted its current name to avoid confusion with Kinston, North Carolina.

== Geography ==
According to the United States Census Bureau, the town has a total area of 1.8 square miles (4.7 km^{2}), all land.

== Demographics ==
Historical population
Census	Pop.	Note	%±
1990	956		—
2000	845		−11.6%
2010	681		−19.4%
2020	656		−3.7%
U.S. Decennial Census

=== Racial and ethnic composition ===
Kingstown town, North Carolina – Racial and ethnic composition Note: the US Census treats Hispanic/Latino as an ethnic category. This table excludes Latinos from the racial categories and assigns them to a separate category. Hispanics/Latinos may be of any race.
Race / Ethnicity (NH = Non-Hispanic)	Pop 2000	Pop 2010	Pop 2020	% 2000	% 2010	% 2020
White alone (NH)	37	53	56	4.38%	7.78%	8.54%
Black or African American alone (NH)	782	607	579	92.54%	89.13%	88.26%
Native American or Alaska Native alone (NH)	0	1	0	0.00%	0.15%	0.00%
Asian alone (NH)	10	6	2	1.18%	0.88%	0.30%
Native Hawaiian or Pacific Islander alone (NH)	0	0	0	0.00%	0.00%	0.00%
Other race alone (NH)	0	0	1	0.00%	0.00%	0.15%
Mixed race or Multiracial (NH)	4	7	9	0.47%	1.03%	1.37%
Hispanic or Latino (any race)	12	7	9	1.42%	1.03%	1.37%
Total	845	681	656	100.00%	100.00%	100.00%

=== 2020 census ===
As of the 2020 United States census, there were 656 people, 194 households, and 135 families residing in the town.

=== 2000 census ===
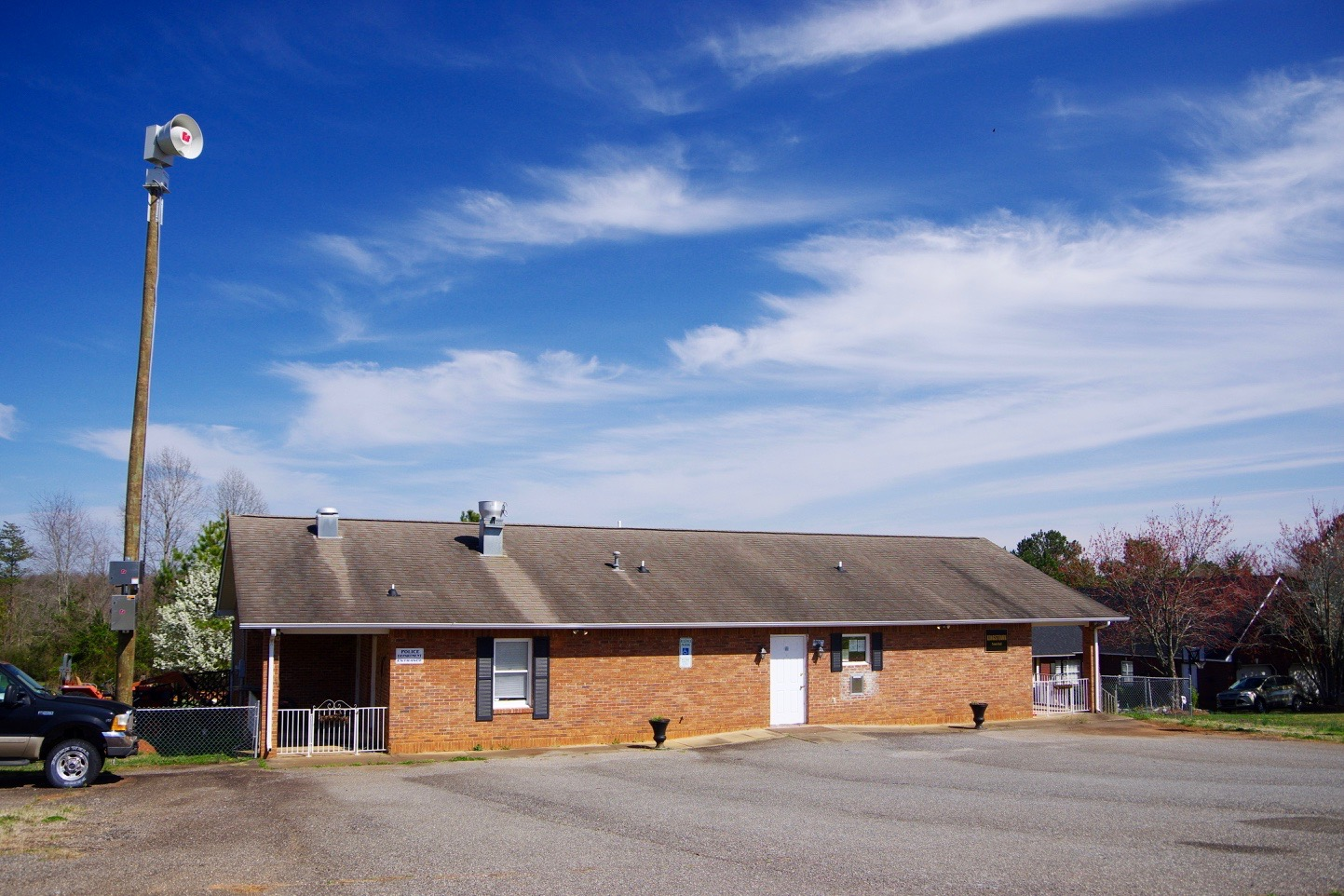
Town hall

As of the census of 2000, there were 845 people, 258 households, and 210 families residing in the town. The population density was 480.0 inhabitants per square mile (185.3/km^{2}). There were 273 housing units at an average density of 155.1 per square mile (59.9/km^{2}). The racial makeup of the town was 4.38% White, 92.78% African American, 1.18% Asian, 0.95% from other races, and 0.71% from two or more races. Hispanic or Latino of any race were 1.42% of the population.

There were 258 households, out of which 30.2% had children under the age of 18 living with them, 47.7% were married couples living together, 29.1% had a female householder with no husband present, and 18.6% were non-families. 17.1% of all households were made up of individuals, and 5.4% had someone living alone who was 65 years of age or older. The average household size was 3.24 and the average family size was 3.59.

In the town, the population was spread out, with 31.6% under the age of 18, 9.8% from 18 to 24, 22.8% from 25 to 44, 26.5% from 45 to 64, and 9.2% who were 65 years of age or older. The median age was 33 years. For every 100 females, there were 87.4 males. For every 100 females age 18 and over, there were 84.1 males.

The median income for a household in the town was $32,054, and the median income for a family was $33,281. Males had a median income of $24,583 versus $20,903 for females. The per capita income for the town was $11,956. About 18.4% of families and 17.8% of the population were below the poverty line, including 18.7% of those under age 18 and 18.4% of those age 65 or over.
