= Hilltop, Georgia =

- Unincorporated community Census-designated place
- Location in Pike County and the state of Georgia
- Coordinates: 33°6′14″N 84°26′2″W
- Country: United States
- State: Georgia
- County: Pike

Area
  - Total: 0.98 sq mi (2.55 km^{2})
  - Land: 0.96 sq mi (2.49 km^{2})
  - Water: 0.023 sq mi (0.06 km^{2})
- Elevation: 850 ft (259 m)

Population (2020)
  - Total: 245
  - Density: 254.6/sq mi (98.31/km^{2})
- Time zone: UTC-5 (Eastern (EST))
  - Summer (DST): UTC-4 (EDT)
- FIPS code: 13-38866
- GNIS feature ID: 1852875

Hilltop is an unincorporated community and census-designated place (CDP) in Pike County, Georgia, United States. The population was 245 in 2020.

== Geography ==
Hilltop is located at 33°6′14″N 84°26′2″W (33.103864, -84.433959).

According to the United States Census Bureau, the CDP has a total area of 1.0 square mile (2.6 km^{2}), of which 1.0 square mile (2.6 km^{2}) is land and 0.04 square miles (0.10 km^{2}) (2.04%) is water.

== Demographics ==
Historical population
Census	Pop.	Note	%±
2000	401		—
2010	262		−34.7%
2020	245		−6.5%
U.S. Decennial Census; 1850-1870 1870-1880; 1890-1910 1920-1930; 1940 1950 1960; 1970 1980 1990; 2000 2010 2020

Hilltop was first listed as a CDP in the 2000 U.S. census.

=== Racial and ethnic composition ===
Hilltop CDP, Georgia – Racial and ethnic composition Note: the US Census treats Hispanic/Latino as an ethnic category. This table excludes Latinos from the racial categories and assigns them to a separate category. Hispanics/Latinos may be of any race.
Race / Ethnicity (NH = Non-Hispanic)	Pop 2000	Pop 2010	Pop 2020	% 2000	% 2010	% 2020
White alone (NH)	48	29	46	11.97%	11.07%	18.78%
Black or African American alone (NH)	352	233	195	87.78%	88.93%	79.59%
Native American or Alaska Native alone (NH)	1	0	0	0.25%	0.00%	0.00%
Asian alone (NH)	0	0	0	0.00%	0.00%	0.00%
Native Hawaiian or Pacific Islander alone (NH)	0	0	0	0.00%	0.00%	0.00%
Other race alone (NH)	0	0	1	0.00%	0.00%	0.41%
Mixed race or Multiracial (NH)	0	0	3	0.00%	0.00%	1.22%
Hispanic or Latino (any race)	0	0	0	0.00%	0.00%	0.00%
Total	401	262	245	100.00%	100.00%	100.00%

=== 2000 census ===
As of the census of 2000, there were 401 people, 119 households, and 91 families residing in the CDP. By the 2020 census, there were 245 people in the CDP.

== Education ==
Hilltop Public Schools are part of the Pike County School District. The school district has one Pre-K building (lottery funded), one primary school (K-2), one elementary school (3–5), one middle school (6–8), a ninth grade academy and two high schools.

Michael Duncan is the Superintendent of Schools.
