= Cypress Quarters, Florida =

Unincorporated community in Florida, US

- CDP
- Location in Okeechobee County and the state of Florida
- Coordinates: 27°15′18″N 80°48′48″W
- Country: United States
- State: Florida
- County: Okeechobee

Area
  - Total: 2.70 sq mi (7.00 km^{2})
  - Land: 2.67 sq mi (6.92 km^{2})
  - Water: 0.031 sq mi (0.08 km^{2})
- Elevation: 26 ft (7.9 m)

Population (2020)
  - Total: 1,029
  - Density: 385.3/sq mi (148.78/km^{2})
- Time zone: UTC-5 (Eastern (EST))
  - Summer (DST): UTC-4 (EDT)
- FIPS code: 12-16100
- GNIS feature ID: 2402397

Cypress Quarters is a census-designated place (CDP) in Okeechobee County, Florida, United States. As of the 2020 census, Cypress Quarters had a population of 1,029.

== Geography ==
According to the United States Census Bureau, the CDP has a total area of 2.7 square miles (7.0 km^{2}), all land.

== Demographics ==
Historical population
Census	Pop.	Note	%±
2000	1,150		—
2010	1,215		5.7%
2020	1,029		−15.3%
U.S. Decennial Census

=== 2020 census ===
As of the 2020 census, Cypress Quarters had a population of 1,029. The median age was 38.9 years. 26.6% of residents were under the age of 18 and 18.2% were 65 years of age or older. For every 100 females, there were 95.6 males, and for every 100 females age 18 and over there were 104.1 males age 18 and over.

86.3% of residents lived in urban areas, while 13.7% lived in rural areas.

There were 363 households, of which 34.2% had children under the age of 18 living in them. Of all households, 41.9% were married-couple households, 20.9% were households with a male householder and no spouse or partner present, and 28.9% were households with a female householder and no spouse or partner present. About 24.5% of all households were made up of individuals and 9.9% had someone living alone who was 65 years of age or older.

There were 436 housing units, of which 16.7% were vacant. The homeowner vacancy rate was 2.3% and the rental vacancy rate was 16.1%.

Cypress Quarters, Florida – Racial and ethnic composition Note: the U.S. census treats Hispanic/Latino as an ethnic category. This table excludes Latinos from the racial categories and assigns them to a separate category. Hispanics/Latinos may be of any race.
Race / Ethnicity (NH = Non-Hispanic)	Pop 2000	Pop 2010	Pop 2020	% 2000	% 2010	2020
White alone (NH)	313	331	258	27.22%	27.24%	25.07%
Black or African American alone (NH)	757	700	544	65.83%	57.61%	52.87%
Native American or Alaska Native alone (NH)	6	1	6	0.52%	0.08%	0.58%
Asian alone (NH)	5	19	14	0.43%	1.56%	1.36%
Pacific Islander alone (NH)	0	1	1	0.00%	0.08%	0.10%
Some Other Race alone (NH)	0	0	8	0.00%	0.00%	0.78%
Mixed Race or Multi-Racial (NH)	6	16	24	0.52%	1.32%	2.33%
Hispanic or Latino (any race)	63	147	174	5.48%	12.10%	16.91%
Total	1,150	1,215	1,029	100.00%	100.00%	100.00%

=== 2000 census ===
As of the census of 2000, there were 1,150 people, 420 households, and 291 families residing in the CDP. The population density was 425.0 inhabitants per square mile (164.1/km^{2}). There were 469 housing units at an average density of 173.3 per square mile (66.9/km^{2}). The racial makeup of the CDP was 29.22% White, 65.83% African American, 0.61% Native American, 0.43% Asian, 3.04% from other races, and 0.87% from two or more races. Hispanic or Latino of any race were 5.48% of the population.

There were 420 households, out of which 29.3% had children under the age of 18 living with them, 40.2% were married couples living together, 24.5% had a female householder with no husband present, and 30.7% were non-families. 25.5% of all households were made up of individuals, and 9.5% had someone living alone who was 65 years of age or older. The average household size was 2.72 and the average family size was 3.26.

In the CDP, the population was spread out, with 30.7% under the age of 18, 9.6% from 18 to 24, 22.6% from 25 to 44, 24.1% from 45 to 64, and 13.0% who were 65 years of age or older. The median age was 33 years. For every 100 females, there were 94.3 males. For every 100 females age 18 and over, there were 89.3 males.

The median income for a household in the CDP was $29,565, and the median income for a family was $38,125. Males had a median income of $31,103 versus $17,411 for females. The per capita income for the CDP was $13,046. About 25.4% of families and 30.5% of the population were below the poverty line, including 32.1% of those under age 18 and 16.7% of those age 65 or over.

== Education ==
The sole school district in the county is Okeechobee County School District.
