= Charleston Park, Florida =

- Census-designated place
- Location in Lee County and the state of Florida
- Coordinates: 26°42′20″N 81°34′50″W
- Country: United States
- State: Florida
- County: Lee

Area
  - Total: 0.12 sq mi (0.32 km^{2})
  - Land: 0.12 sq mi (0.32 km^{2})
  - Water: 0 sq mi (0.00 km^{2})
- Elevation: 16 ft (4.9 m)

Population (2020)
  - Total: 235
  - Density: 1,912.7/sq mi (738.51/km^{2})
- Time zone: UTC-5 (Eastern (EST))
  - Summer (DST): UTC-4 (EDT)
- ZIP code: 33920
- Area code: 239
- FIPS code: 12-11597
- GNIS feature ID: 2402763

Charleston Park is an unincorporated community and census-designated place (CDP) in Lee County, Florida, United States. The population was 235 at the 2020 census, up from 218 at the 2010 census. It is part of the Cape Coral-Fort Myers, Florida Metropolitan Statistical Area.

== Geography ==
Charleston Park is located in the northeast corner of Lee County. Florida State Road 80 forms the northern border of the community; the highway leads east 10 miles (16 km) to LaBelle and west 20 miles (32 km) to the center of Fort Myers, the Lee county seat.

According to the United States Census Bureau, the CDP has a total area of 0.12 square miles (0.32 km^{2}), all land.

== Demographics ==
Historical population
Census	Pop.	Note	%±
2000	411		—
2010	218		−47.0%
2020	235		7.8%
U.S. Decennial Census

=== 2020 census ===
Charleston Park, Florida – Racial and ethnic composition Note: the US Census treats Hispanic/Latino as an ethnic category. This table excludes Latinos from the racial categories and assigns them to a separate category. Hispanics/Latinos may be of any race.
Race / Ethnicity (NH = Non-Hispanic)	Pop 2000	Pop 2010	Pop 2020	% 2000	% 2010	% 2020
White alone (NH)	17	36	21	4.14%	16.51%	8.95%
Black or African American alone (NH)	337	160	140	82.00%	73.39%	59.57%
Native American or Alaska Native alone (NH)	0	0	1	0.00%	0.00%	0.43%
Asian alone (NH)	0	1	0	0.00%	0.46%	0.00%
Native Hawaiian or Pacific Islander alone (NH)	0	0	0	0.00%	0.00%	0.00%
Other race (NH)	0	0	1	0.00%	0.00%	0.43%
Mixed race or Multiracial (NH)	8	0	9	1.95%	0.00%	3.83%
Hispanic or Latino (any race)	49	21	63	11.92%	9.63%	26.81%
Total	411	218	235	100.00%	100.00%	100.00%

As of the census of 2000, there were 411 people, 112 households, and 85 families residing in the CDP. The population density was 3,379.5 inhabitants per square mile (1,304.8/km^{2}). There were 117 housing units at an average density of 962.0 per square mile (371.4/km^{2}). The racial makeup of the CDP was 8.03% White, 83.70% African American, 6.33% from other races, and 1.95% from two or more races. Hispanic or Latino of any race were 11.92% of the population.

There were 112 households, out of which 51.8% had children under the age of 18 living with them, 38.4% were married couples living together, 26.8% had a female householder with no husband present, and 24.1% were non-families. 18.8% of all households were made up of individuals, and 9.8% had someone living alone who was 65 years of age or older. The average household size was 3.67 and the average family size was 4.19.

In the CDP, the population was spread out, with 44.5% under the age of 18, 10.7% from 18 to 24, 23.8% from 25 to 44, 14.1% from 45 to 64, and 6.8% who were 65 years of age or older. The median age was 22 years. For every 100 females, there were 86.8 males. For every 100 females age 18 and over, there were 85.4 males.

The median income for a household in the CDP was $24,464, and the median income for a family was $26,625. Males had a median income of $20,962 versus $15,625 for females. The per capita income for the CDP was $7,528. About 20.0% of families and 18.1% of the population were below the poverty line, including 21.1% of those under age 18 and none of those age 65 or over.
