= Jesse Brough =

Mississippi state legislator (1876–1934)

Jesse Julius Brough (1876–1934) was a piano salesman and state legislator in Mississippi. He served in the Mississippi House of Representatives. He lived in Pace, Mississippi. He represented Bolivar County. He was blind. In 1927 the area flooded.

Born in Sunflower County, he was the son of William Henry Brough, a Confederate Army veteran who was born in Georgia. Jesse Brough went to school in Shaw, Mississippi and attended the Arkansas Institute for the Blind in Little Rock. He married Pearl Evelyn Harvey. In 1920, the Mississippi House of Representatives passed a bill to award him $5,000 after he lost his eyesight after surgery in Vicksburg, attributing the injury to negligence.

He was a justice of the peace.
