= Lum v. Rice =

- Supreme Court of the United States

Submitted October 12, 1927 Decided November 21, 1927
- Full case name: Gong Lum, et al. v. Rice et al.
- Citations: 275 U.S. 78 (more) 48 S. Ct. 91; 72 L. Ed. 172; 1927 U.S. LEXIS 256

Case history
- Prior: Trial court ordered writ of mandamus. Reversed by Supreme Court of Mississippi, 139 Miss. 760, 104 So. 105.

Holding
- Chinese children do not meet the statutory definition of "White" and thus may lawfully be denied admission to schools reserved for children of that race only; attendance at school for Black students is constitutional as long as facilities are equal to those provided Whites. Classifying students by race and segregating them is within state authority under Fourteenth Amendment. Mississippi Supreme Court affirmed.

Court membership
- Chief Justice William H. Taft Associate Justices Oliver W. Holmes Jr. · Willis Van Devanter; James C. McReynolds · Louis Brandeis; George Sutherland · Pierce Butler; Edward T. Sanford · Harlan F. Stone

Case opinion
- Majority: Taft, joined by unanimous

Laws applied
- U.S. Const. amend. XIV
- Overruled by
- Brown v. Board of Education (1954, in part)

Lum v. Rice, 275 U.S. 78 (1927), is a United States Supreme Court case in which the Court held that the exclusion on account of race of a child of Chinese ancestry from a public school did not violate the Fourteenth Amendment to the United States Constitution. The decision effectively approved the exclusion of any minority children from schools reserved for whites.

The case was brought by the Lum family of Rosedale, Mississippi, Chinese immigrants with two American-born children who had attended local public schools for white children without incident until, in the wake of an increase in anti-Chinese sentiment nationwide after passage of the Immigration Act of 1924, they were told by administrators that their children could only attend the district's school for black children. Adrienne Berard points out in Water Tossing Boulders that their reason for choosing to avoid black schools was motivated by racism. In fact, Katherine Lum later told a reporter, "I did not want my children to attend the 'colored' schools [because] the community would have classified us as Negroes." They filed suit in local court to force the district to allow their daughters to continue attending the white school.

Earl Brewer, a former governor of the state, represented the Lums, arguing that forcing the girls to attend the inferior school violated their Fourteenth Amendment rights, and that since they were not Black they should be allowed to attend the schools for whites. He was able to win the writ of mandamus they sought, but then the school district appealed to the Mississippi Supreme Court, which heard the case en banc and unanimously reversed the lower court, holding that Mississippi's constitution and laws clearly distinguished Asians ("Mongolians", it called them) from whites, so the Lums could not attend white schools.

The U.S. Supreme Court granted Brewer's certiorari petition to review the case. The case was never argued, just decided on its briefs, and the Lums' was so poor it led Justice Louis Brandeis to ask around if some other lawyer could be found on short notice to argue the case. Chief Justice William Howard Taft's unanimous opinion ended with a pronouncement that all racial segregation in schools was constitutional; while it was overturned by Brown v. Board of Education a quarter-century later, it gave greater legal foundation to educational segregation in the short term and set back efforts to end it.

== Background ==
=== Legal background ===
In the 1885 case Tape v. Hurley, California's Supreme Court held that a Chinese student's exclusion from a San Francisco public school was unconstitutional; the state responded by allowing the establishment of segregated schools.

Two years earlier, in the Civil Rights Cases, the Court had held that the Thirteenth and Fourteenth Amendments to the Constitution, both passed in the years after the war, only barred racial discrimination by the government, not private parties. In 1896's Plessy v. Ferguson, a case which upheld the constitutionality of laws that mandated segregation in railway coaches, the Court had noted the history of segregated schools in the United States as a justification for its decision.

=== The Lum family ===
Jeu Gong Lum, a native of southern China, illegally immigrated to the U.S. (Note: At the time, the Chinese Exclusion Act severely limited which Chinese could lawfully enter the U.S.) from Canada in 1904 and settled in the lower Mississippi Delta, where immigration laws were less enforced as employers sought to replace Black workers who had left for the North. There he married Katherine Wong, a Chinese American woman who had been adopted as an orphan in China and raised mostly in the U.S. by a Chinese father who grew wealthy operating a general store. Lum, too, opened a general store in the small Bolivar County town of Benoit that primarily served the area's Black population, barred from many business establishments by strict racial segregation laws. Operating a store made Lum a merchant and thus exempt from the Exclusion Act.

The couple had two daughters, Berda and Martha, and later a son, Hamilton. Both Gong Jeu and Katherine especially sought to make sure their children lived a better life than they had. While Berda resisted her parents' efforts to educate her, desiring to leave the Delta region when she grew up, Martha consistently earned good grades in the local school.

== Underlying dispute ==
In 1923, the Lums bought a house in Rosedale and moved there. The girls attended Rosedale Consolidated High School of the Rosedale Consolidated School District for two semesters. The following September, that ended when the school district, in response to the passage of the Immigration Act of 1924, which effectively ended all immigration from Asia, told the Lum girls they could no longer attend its schools for whites because they were not considered white.

There was no school in the district maintained for Chinese students, and the Lum daughters were required to attend school. That left the district's school for colored children as the only public school available. It was underfunded and poorly equipped; the Lums did not want their daughters educated there. They retained local lawyer Earl L. Brewer, a former governor who had just overwhelmingly lost an election to the U.S. Senate, to represent them in legal action against the district. The Lums and their daughters were the plaintiffs; all the members of the school district's board of trustees, and other state education officials, were named as defendants, with the head of the board of trustees, Greek Rice, as the lead. Among the state officials was the state superintendent of education, Willard Faroe Bond, whom Brewer believed to have betrayed him politically while he was governor; Brewer thus drew some satisfaction from the knowledge that Bond would be personally served with the legal papers.

A lower court granted the plaintiffs' request of a writ of mandamus to force the members of the board of trustees to admit the Lums. Their case was not that racial discrimination as such was illegal but that the daughters had incorrectly been classified as colored by the authorities.

=== Mississippi Supreme Court ===
The trustees appealed to the Supreme Court of Mississippi, which decided to hear the case en banc, with all six justices participating. Assistant attorney general Elmer Clinton Sharp argued the case for the school district, reiterating the history of segregation in the state and saying that Asians and Native Americans were not considered white. Brewer argued in response that while the state constitution had indeed not put whites and Asians on equal footing, it had also distinguished Asians and Blacks, and therefore the Fourteenth Amendment required that the Lum children be schooled with whites.

The court reversed the lower court's decision and allowed the board of trustees to exclude Martha Lum from the school for white children. Justice George Ethridge, a former teacher to whom his colleagues generally deferred in matters related to education, wrote for a unanimous court that considered the case as a question of whether the Lum children were within the statutory definition of white. While some other states' courts and statutes had extended the definition of "white" to include members of other races who were not Black, Mississippi's constitution and statutes were clearer in defining white people as those not "colored". "[W]e think," he wrote, "that the constitutional convention used the word 'colored' in the broad sense rather than the restricted sense; its purpose being to provide schools for the white or Caucasian race, to which schools no other race could be admitted, carrying out the broad dominant purpose of preserving the purity and integrity of the white race and its social policy."

Ethridge found the most relevant precedent to be Moreau v. Grandich, a 1917 case where, in an opinion he had also authored, a unanimous court upheld the dismissal of several children of a white couple from the Bay St. Louis schools after it was learned that they had a Black great-grandmother. (Note: The record suggests that she was a Native American with dark skin who was considered Black since she socialized with Black people and worshipped at a black church.) While that case had not gone beyond the instant issue in deciding that those whose racial heritage was colored above a certain threshold were themselves legally colored, Ethridge wrote, "a careful reading of the opinion ... shows that the court did not intend to restrict the term 'colored' to persons having negro blood in their veins or who were descendants of negroes or of the negro race."

The state had also, since 1892, prohibited marriages between whites and Asians, for whom it used the term "Mongolians", the latter being defined as anyone with more than one-eighth Asian ancestry. Asians and coloreds, also barred from marrying whites, were free to marry each other, Ethridge noted. He added that a pair of U.S. Supreme Court decisions had both held that Asians were not white or Caucasian in the historical sense of how that word had been understood in the United States.

Martha Lum's right to an education was not affected by the decision, Ethridge concluded. She could attend the colored school, but did not have to, as she could also be educated privately, as long as she was educated. Lum and Brewer petitioned the U.S. Supreme Court for certiorari.

== U.S. Supreme Court ==
=== Before the Court ===
After the Supreme Court agreed to hear the case in 1927, Brewer was preoccupied with representing the relatives of a Black man in Bolivar County who had been murdered immediately following his acquittal on murder charges in the death of a local white farmer's son, as they sought to have the killers brought to justice. Brewer handed the Lum case to a younger associate, James Flowers, who had prior to his employment with Brewer worked primarily as corporate counsel for several railroads in Mississippi. Flowers was aware that he was ignorant in the areas of law related to the case, especially the Fourteenth Amendment.

Flowers' brief for the Supreme Court justices was inconsistent, alternating between defending segregation but attacking it inasmuch as he argued the Constitution protected Lum from being forced to attend a colored school, yet ending with a suggestion that segregated schools were inherently unequal. Justice Louis Brandeis, who believed the Fourteenth Amendment allowed too much federal interference with state authority yet was open to arguments that discrimination against members of minority groups violated their due process rights under the Fifth Amendment, to the point that he had written several majority opinions to that effect (most recently Ng Fung Ho v. White, another case involving Chinese petitioners) was deeply disturbed by the brief; he asked a friend, Felix Frankfurter (himself later appointed to the Court), if it might be possible to find more competent counsel for the Lums.

The Lums themselves, realizing that the case had implications for all Chinese Americans, had similar concerns, and had arranged for a longtime friend of theirs, not a lawyer, to travel to Washington and be present at oral argument. That would be unnecessary. Within a week of filing the brief, the Court informed Flowers by telegram that it had scheduled the case for argument within the next week.

The short time available to travel to Washington, and the possibility that the case would be forfeited to the state if no one argued for the Lums, was the least of Flowers' concerns. He had never argued a case before any court, considering himself a poor public speaker. First he sought a continuance but learned that was unlikely, so then he and Brewer asked if the case could be decided purely on the basis of the briefs. The Court allowed that, and there would be no oral argument of Lum v. Rice before it.

=== Opinion of the Court ===
Late in November 1927 the Court announced its decision. In a nine-page unanimous opinion, with no footnotes, written by Chief Justice and former U.S. President William Howard Taft, it affirmed the Mississippi Supreme Court's ruling and thus the position of the board of trustees. Taft held that the petitioner had not shown that there were no segregated schools accessible for the education of Martha Lum in Mississippi:

We must assume, then, that there are school districts for colored children in Bolivar county, but that no colored school is within the limits of the Rosedale consolidated high school district. This is not inconsistent with there being at a place outside of that district and in a different district, a colored school which the plaintiff Martha Lum may conveniently attend.

Taft further stated that given the accessibility of segregated schools, the question then was whether a person of Chinese ancestry, born in and a citizen of the United States, was denied equal protection of the law by being given the opportunity to attend a school that received "only children of the brown, yellow or black races." In reference to Cumming v. Richmond County Board of Education, Taft concluded that the "right and power of the state to regulate the method of providing for the education of its youth at public expense is clear." Additionally, Taft pointed to a number of federal and state court decisions, most prominently Plessy v. Ferguson, all of which had upheld segregation in the public sphere and particularly in the realm of public education. Accordingly, Taft concluded:

Most of the cases cited arose, it is true, over the establishment of separate schools as between white pupils and black pupils; but we cannot think that the question is any different, or that any different result can be reached, assuming the cases above cited to be rightly decided, where the issue is as between white pupils and the pupils of the yellow races. The decision is within the discretion of the state in regulating its public schools, and does not conflict with the Fourteenth Amendment.

== Aftermath ==
The Lums had pre-emptively moved across the river to Arkansas, which did not restrict Chinese attendance at its schools as strictly, in case the decision went down against them. When it did, they settled in Elaine, where they opened another grocery and Katherine was able to find a high school that would accept her daughters. It was not as prosperous a market as the one in Rosedale, and in later years the family left the Delta region entirely.

Other Chinese residents in Mississippi likewise began leaving the Delta, some even returning to China; save for those who found a few school districts still willing to accept their children in their white schools. Other Chinese families established private schools; in the late 1930s the state of Mississippi formally established some schools for Chinese students. They were never well-attended, and the last one closed in 1947.

Earl Brewer continued to pursue civil rights cases in the courts. In 1936 he successfully argued Brown v. Mississippi before the Supreme Court, which held that confessions obtained through beatings and torture were inadmissible as evidence, reversing the convictions of several of his clients. Brewer died in 1942, before he could live to see schools desegregated, but that had happened by the time Jeu Gong died in 1965 and Katherine in 1988.

=== Press reaction ===
Newspapers around the country carried the Associated Press account of the decision. Some responded with editorials. The Los Angeles Times put its response, praising the Court and advocating for further segregation, on the front page:

The Supreme Court's opinion points the way toward making [segregation] still more effective. So far segregation depends largely upon private agreement, and private agreements sometimes break down when they are submitted to severe strain. It will be better all around when they can be given legal backing.

The Chicago Defender, a prominent Black newspaper, also ran a front-page editorial, condemning the decision as ignoring the "separate but equal" provisions supposedly governing segregation in light of the conditions found in many schools for Black children only:

It is the opinion of Chief Justice William Howard Taft that these opportunities are equal ... The little shacks you attend, in which a large coal stove in the center of the room furnishes both heat and smoke—the ramshackle, tumble-down contraption, situated far down among the cotton stalks—is equal of the beautiful stone and brick structure attended by whites. You see, the three months you are allowed to attend this institution, between the sowing, chopping and picking of cotton, are equal to the nine months white children go to school. Your teachers, barely out of the primary school themselves, possessing no special training for teachers, are the equals of white teachers all especially trained and prepared for the work they undertake.

== Legacy ==
Lum continued to be cited in briefs supporting racial segregation, and court decisions upholding it, until it was effectively overruled 27 years later by the Court's decision in Brown v. Board of Education, which outlawed segregation in public schools. An important part of the decision still stands—the power of the state to make racial distinctions in its school system, and to determine the race of its students. It has not been overturned because it was not an issue in Brown.

It is remembered today for increasing the scope of permissible segregation. Historian and educator James Loewen called Lum "the most racist Supreme Court decision in the twentieth century". Legal scholar Jamal Greene has called it an "ugly and unfortunate" decision. "The Court's ruling had established a precedent more powerful than the Lum family could have imagined", observed Adrienne Berard, in Water Tossing Boulders, a history of the case. "By fighting, they had only made the enemy stronger."

== See also ==
- 1927 in the United States
- List of United States Supreme Court cases, volume 275
- List of United States Supreme Court cases by the Taft Court
- Chinese Americans in the Mississippi Delta
