= Malvina, Mississippi =

- Unincorporated community
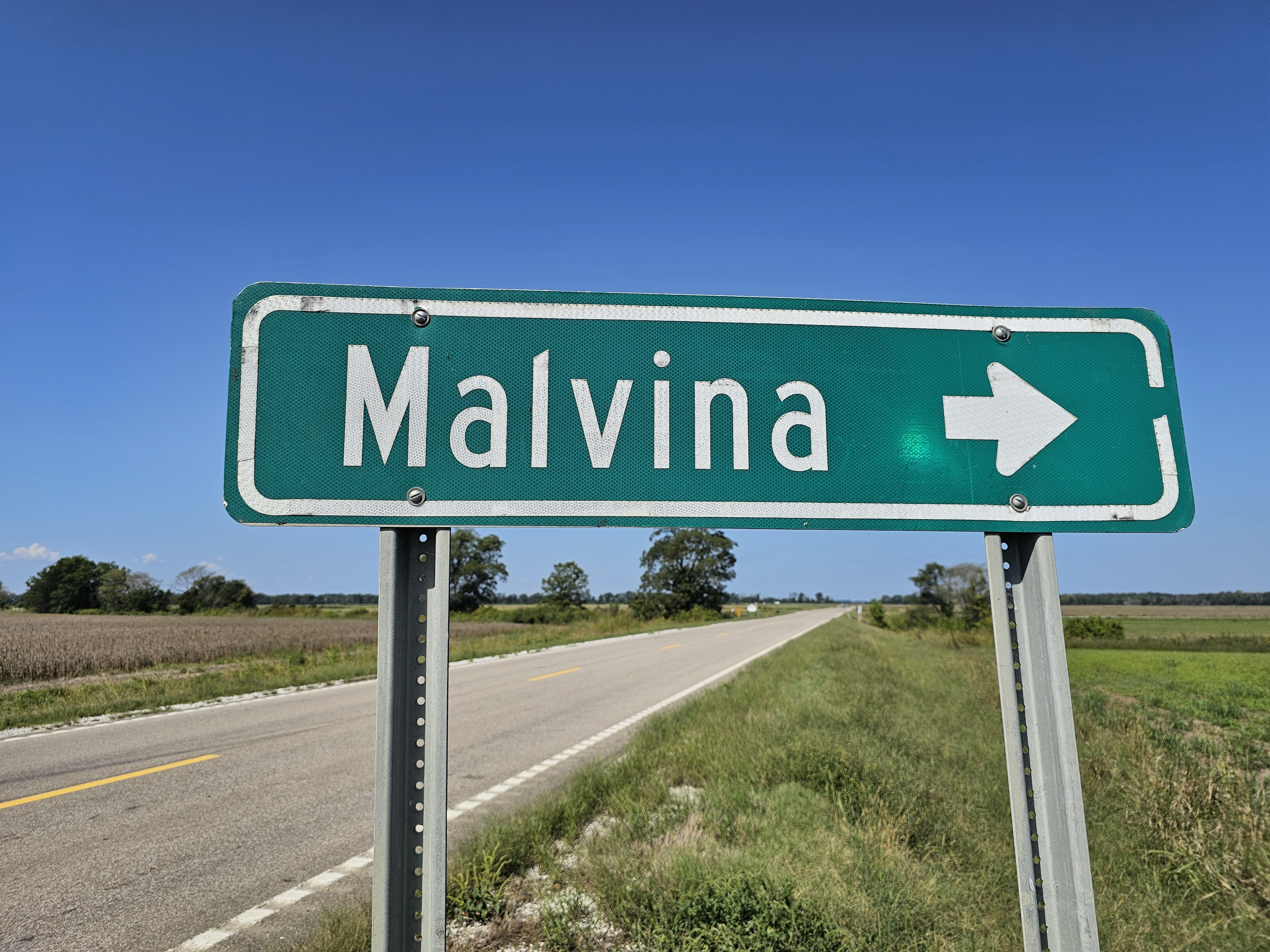
- Highway sign in Malvina

- Location within Mississippi Location within the United States
- Coordinates: 33°50′58″N 90°55′02″W
- Country: United States
- State: Mississippi
- County: Bolivar
- Elevation: 144 ft (44 m)
- Time zone: UTC-6 (Central (CST))
  - Summer (DST): UTC-5 (CDT)
- ZIP code: 38769
- Area code: 662
- GNIS feature ID: 692039

Malvina is an unincorporated community located in Bolivar County, Mississippi, United States, located approximately 3 miles (4.8 km) northwest of Symonds and approximately 9 miles (14 km) east of Rosedale.

Originally named "Phalia", the town was established in 1887 by Jett Dent, who became the first postmaster. Dent owned a logging company and sawmill, as well as a flat boat with which he plied the waters of the Bogue Phalia, which ran through Phalia.

Phalia was a busy logging town, and the Bogue Phalia was used to run log rafts south to Pace to be milled.

When the Louisville, New Orleans and Texas Railway built a line in the late 1880s between Rosedale and Boyle, a depot, platforms, water tank and wood yard were constructed at Phalia. By 1900, there was a store, two seed houses, and a train that ran twice daily.

In 1901, the town's name was changed to Malvina, after Malvina Yeager Scott.

A post office operated under the name Phalia from 1887 to 1901 and under the name Malvina from 1901 to 1956.

A dirt road ran from Rosedale to Merigold, and passed through Malvina. In 1906, the Board of Supervisors began county-wide gravel road construction.

In the 1920s, a wooden three-way bridge was built in Malvina over the confluence of the Lane Bayou and Bogue Phalia. It was one of the few three-way bridges in the world, and was torn down and replaced by a modern bridge in 1972.
