= Symonds, Mississippi =

- Census-designated place
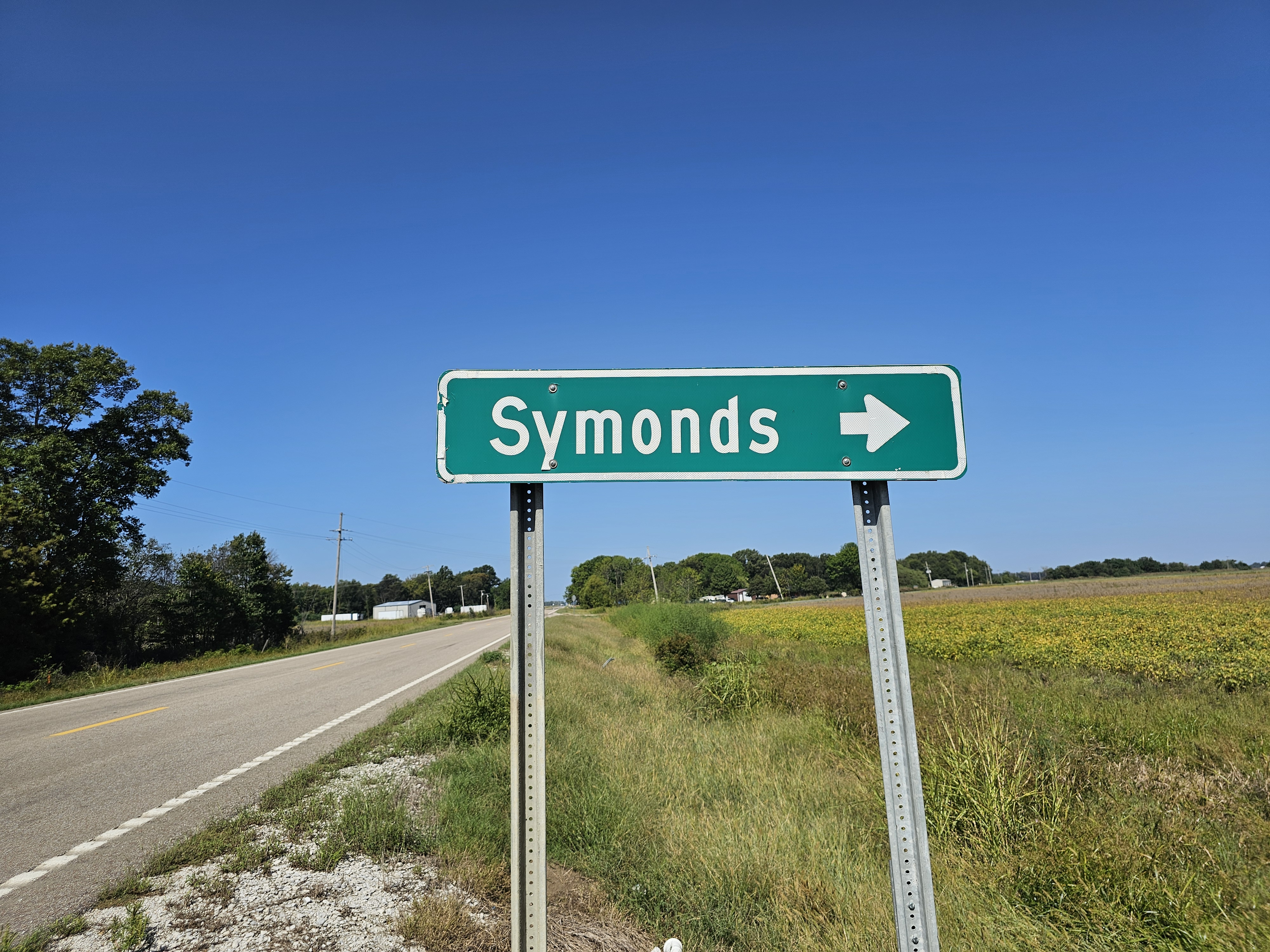
- Highway sign outside of Symonds

- Location within Mississippi Location within the United States
- Coordinates: 33°50′02″N 90°53′22″W
- Country: United States
- State: Mississippi
- County: Bolivar

Area
  - Total: 0.073 sq mi (0.19 km^{2})
  - Land: 0.073 sq mi (0.19 km^{2})
  - Water: 0 sq mi (0.00 km^{2})
- Elevation: 141 ft (43 m)

Population (2020)
  - Total: 72
  - Density: 1,001.6/sq mi (386.73/km^{2})
- Time zone: UTC-6 (Central (CST))
  - Summer (DST): UTC-5 (CDT)
- ZIP code: 38769
- Area code: 662
- GNIS feature ID: 2812714

Symonds is a census-designated place (CDP) and unincorporated community located in Bolivar County, Mississippi, United States. Symonds is approximately 3 miles (4.8 km) southeast of Malvina and approximately 4 miles (6.4 km) northwest of Pace. Symonds is located on the former Yazoo and Mississippi Valley Railroad.

A post office operated under the name Symonds from 1905 to 1954.

Per the 2020 Census, the population was 72.

== Demographics ==
Historical population
Census	Pop.	Note	%±
2020	72		—
U.S. Decennial Census; 2020

Symonds was first listed as a census designated place in the 2020 U.S. census.

=== 2020 census ===
Symonds CDP, Mississippi – Racial and ethnic composition Note: the US Census treats Hispanic/Latino as an ethnic category. This table excludes Latinos from the racial categories and assigns them to a separate category. Hispanics/Latinos may be of any race.
Race / Ethnicity (NH = Non-Hispanic)	Pop 2020	% 2020
White alone (NH)	3	4.17%
Black or African American alone (NH)	66	92.67%
Native American or Alaska Native alone (NH)	0	0.00%
Asian alone (NH)	0	0.00%
Pacific Islander alone (NH)	0	0.00%
Some Other Race alone (NH)	0	0.00%
Mixed Race or Multi-Racial (NH)	2	2.78%
Hispanic or Latino (any race)	1	1.39%
Total	72	100.00%

== Education ==
Symonds is in the West Bolivar Consolidated School District. It was in the pre-merger West Bolivar School District The west Bolivar districts merged in 2014. The pre-merger West Bolivar schools include West Bolivar Elementary School and West Bolivar High School. Previously West Bolivar Middle School was a distinct school.
