= Skene, Mississippi =

- Census-designated place
- Location within Mississippi Location within the United States
- Coordinates: 33°42′14″N 90°47′51″W
- Country: United States
- State: Mississippi
- County: Bolivar

Area
  - Total: 4.12 sq mi (10.68 km^{2})
  - Land: 4.12 sq mi (10.68 km^{2})
  - Water: 0 sq mi (0.00 km^{2})
- Elevation: 131 ft (40 m)

Population (2020)
  - Total: 210
  - Density: 50.9/sq mi (19.66/km^{2})
- Time zone: UTC-6 (Central (CST))
  - Summer (DST): UTC-5 (CDT)
- ZIP code: 38730
- Area code: 662
- GNIS feature ID: 2812713

Skene is a census-designated place (CDP) and unincorporated community located in Bolivar County, Mississippi, United States on Mississippi Highway 446. Skene is approximately 3 miles (4.8 km) west of Boyle and approximately 7 miles (11 km) north of Shaw. Skene was a station on the Boyle and Sunflower branch of the former Yazoo and Mississippi Valley Railroad.

A post office operated under the name Skene from 1902 to 1992.

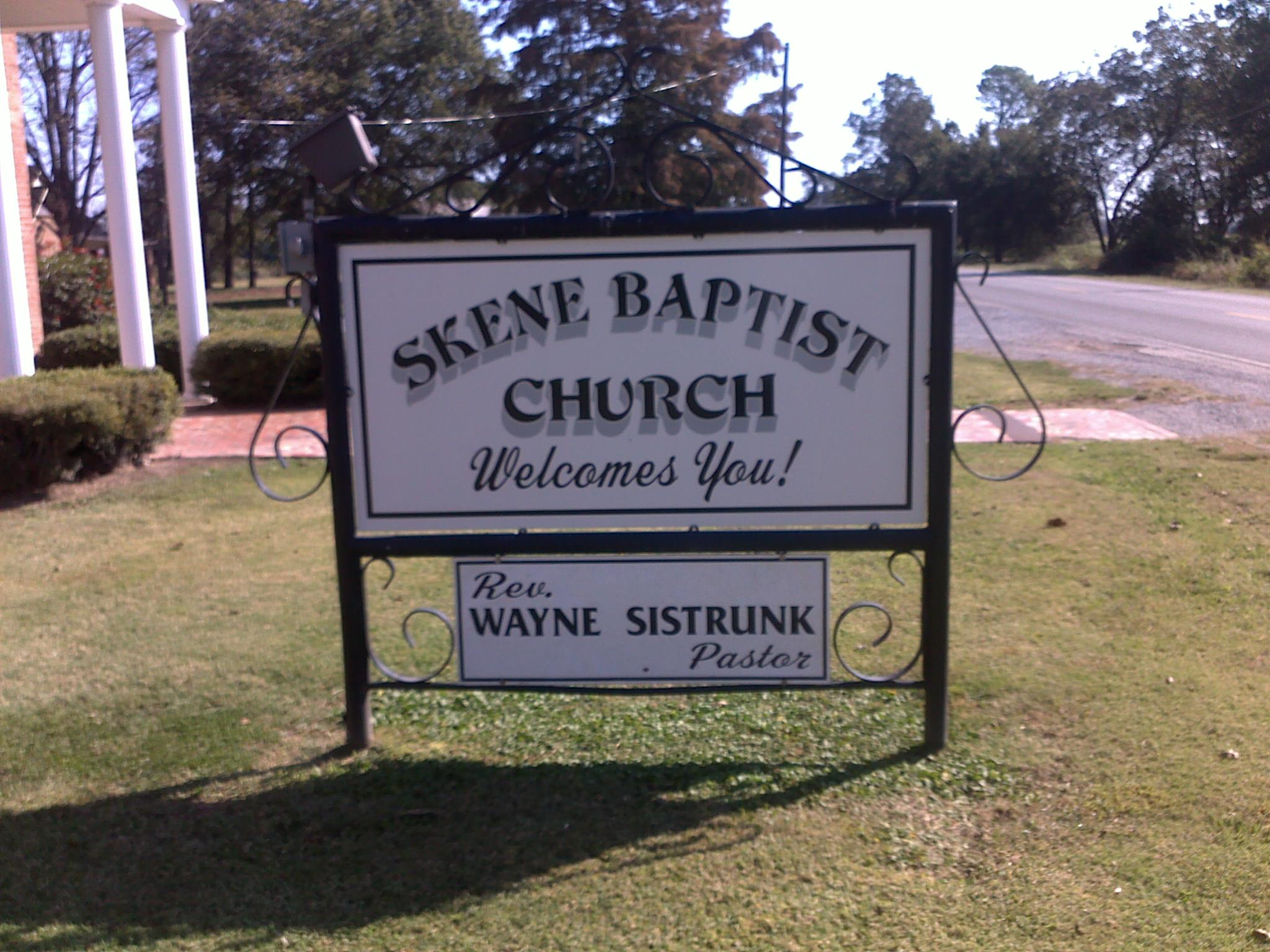
Skene Baptist Church located on Mississippi Highway 446

Per the 2020 Census, the population was 210.

== Demographics ==
Historical population
Census	Pop.	Note	%±
2020	210		—
U.S. Decennial Census; 2020

Skene was first listed as a census designated place in the 2020 U.S. census.

=== 2020 census ===
Skene CDP, Mississippi – Racial and ethnic composition Note: the US Census treats Hispanic/Latino as an ethnic category. This table excludes Latinos from the racial categories and assigns them to a separate category. Hispanics/Latinos may be of any race.
Race / Ethnicity (NH = Non-Hispanic)	Pop 2020	% 2020
White alone (NH)	186	88.57%
Black or African American alone (NH)	13	6.19%
Native American or Alaska Native alone (NH)	0	0.00%
Asian alone (NH)	0	0.00%
Pacific Islander alone (NH)	0	0.00%
Some Other Race alone (NH)	0	0.00%
Mixed Race or Multi-Racial (NH)	9	4.29%
Hispanic or Latino (any race)	2	0.95%
Total	210	100.00%

== Education ==
It is in the West Bolivar Consolidated School District. It was formerly in the Shaw School District. The Shaw district consolidated into the West Bolivar district in 2014.

The K-12 schools for the Shaw area are McEvans Elementary School and Shaw High School (previously together as McEvans K-12 School).

== Notable people ==
- Chet Morgan (1910–1991), Was an American baseball player and manager. He played Major League Baseball, principally for the Detroit Tigers.
