= Shaw High School (Mississippi) =

Location
- 601 Hwy 61 North; Shaw, Mississippi 38773; United States; 33°36′38″N 90°46′00″W

Information
- Type: Public 7-12 school
- School district: West Bolivar Consolidated School District (2014-); Shaw School District (-2014)
- Principal: Daphne Young
- Teaching staff: 19.46 (FTE)
- Enrollment: 199 (2023-2024)
- Student to teacher ratio: 10.23
- Team name: Warriors
- Website: shs.wbcsdk12.org

Shaw High School, formerly McEvans Warriors K-12 School, is a public 7-12 school in Shaw, Mississippi. It is a part of the West Bolivar Consolidated School District.

Until 2014 it was in the Shaw School District, which served Shaw and Skene.

== History ==
The former Shaw High School building was first built in 1923. As of 2017 it had 158 students. Leland School District offers vocational training to Shaw High School students.

McEvans Negro High School formerly existed. In 1958 the school had almost 1,000 students. The building was destroyed in a fire in 1958, causing about $115,000 in damages.

Both Shaw High and McEvans Elementary were in the Shaw School District until July 1, 2014, when that district was consolidated into West Bolivar Consolidated.

At one point the condition of the Shaw High building, at 214 Dean Boulevard, deteriorated to the point where the high school moved in with McEvans Elementary School. In 2020 the facility was renamed the McEvans School and became K-12. Shaw High had green and gold as its colors with a hawk mascot while McEvans Elementary had gold, maroon, and white as colors with a hawk mascot. The school board normally would have asked for more student participation but the COVID-19 pandemic in Mississippi dampened this. The board chose gold, maroon, and white as colors and a warrior mascot.

== Notable alumni ==
- Johnny Parker, strength and conditioning coach played football and track
