= Geraldine Hines =

American judge (born 1947)

Associate Justice of the Massachusetts Supreme Judicial Court
- In office July 31, 2014 – August 18, 2017
- Appointed by: Deval Patrick
- Preceded by: Ralph Gants
- Succeeded by: Scott L. Kafker

Associate Justice of the Massachusetts Appeals Court
- In office January 2013 – July 31, 2014
- Appointed by: Deval Patrick
- Preceded by: James F. McHugh III
- Succeeded by: Gregory I. Massing

Associate Justice of the Massachusetts Superior Court
- In office 2001 – January 2013
- Appointed by: Paul Cellucci
- Succeeded by: Robert L. Ullmann

Personal details
- Born: October 29, 1947 (age 78) Scott, Mississippi
- Education: Tougaloo College; University of Wisconsin Law School

Geraldine S. Hines (born October 29, 1947) is an American retired judge who formerly served as an associate justice of the Massachusetts Supreme Judicial Court from 2014 to 2017. She was nominated in July 2014 by Massachusetts Governor Deval Patrick and confirmed by an 8–0 vote of the Governor's Council. She succeeded Ralph D. Gants, who was promoted to chief justice.

Hines was born in Scott, Mississippi. She attended Tougaloo College in Madison County, Mississippi, and received her Juris Doctor degree from the University of Wisconsin Law School. From 1973 to 1976 she was a public defender with the Roxbury Defenders Committee. She was the attorney in charge of the Roxbury Defenders Committee from 1976 to 1978. She worked in private practice throughout the 1980s and 1990s. She was confirmed for the Massachusetts Superior Court in May 2001 and promoted to the Massachusetts Appeals Court in January 2013. She was sworn into the Supreme Judicial Court on July 31, 2014, becoming the first black woman to serve on the high court. In August 2017, Justice Hines wrote for the unanimous court when it found that the Excessive Bail Clause requires courts to make findings of fact when setting unaffordable bail for an indigent defendant.

She now lives in Roxbury. In 2017, she retired as she approached the mandatory retirement age of 70.

In 2022, Hines served as the chair of a panel appointed by Boston Mayor Michelle Wu to aid in the search for a commissioner of the Boston Police Department.

== See also ==
- List of African-American jurists
