= Scott, Mississippi =

- Census-designated place
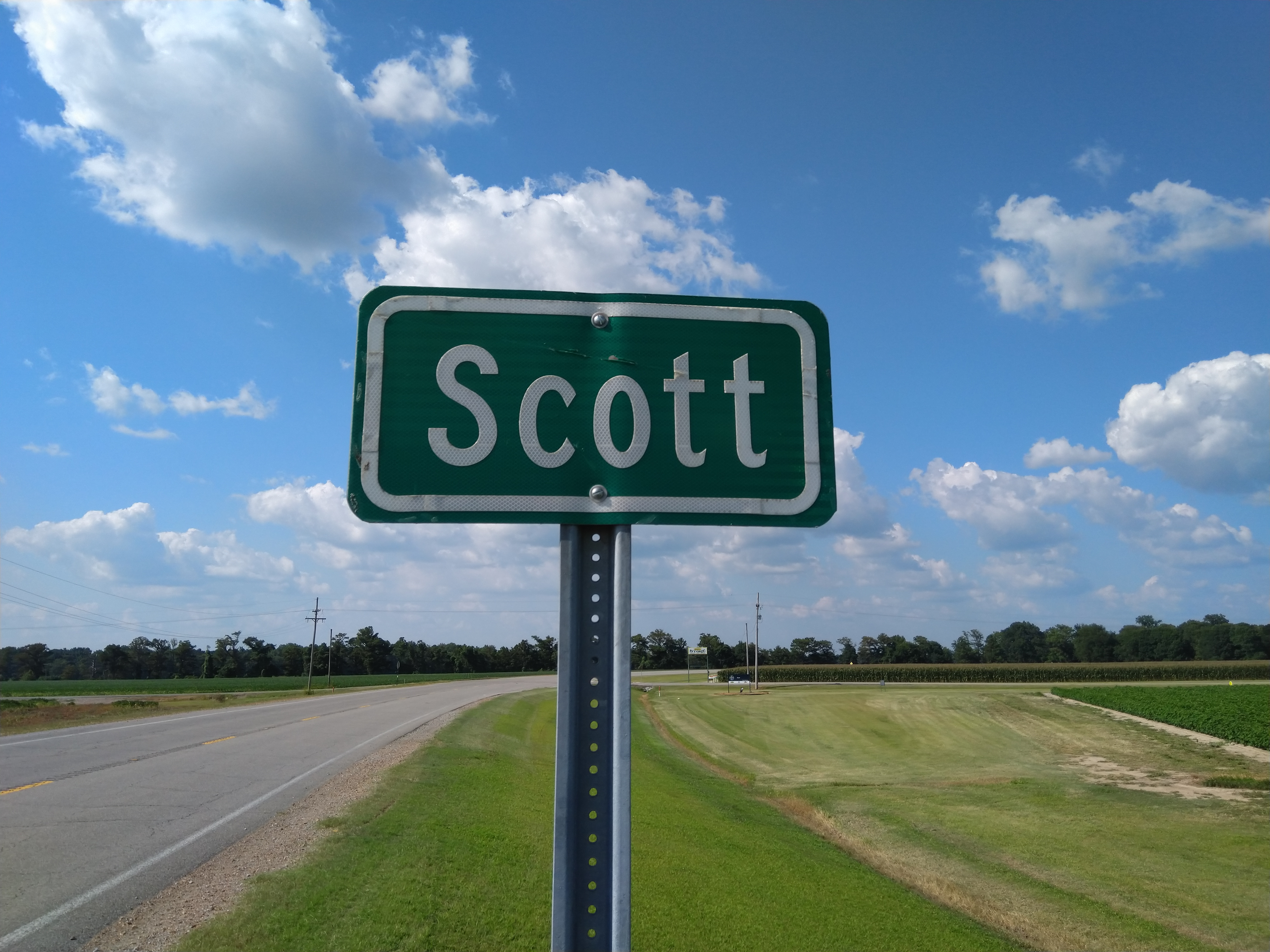
- Highway sign outside of Scott

- Location within Mississippi Location within the United States
- Coordinates: 33°35′40″N 91°04′34″W
- Country: United States
- State: Mississippi
- County: Bolivar

Area
  - Total: 0.44 sq mi (1.15 km^{2})
  - Land: 0.44 sq mi (1.15 km^{2})
  - Water: 0 sq mi (0.00 km^{2})
- Elevation: 141 ft (43 m)

Population (2020)
  - Total: 90
  - Density: 202.0/sq mi (77.98/km^{2})
- Time zone: UTC-6 (Central (CST))
  - Summer (DST): UTC-5 (CDT)
- ZIP code: 38772
- Area code: 662
- GNIS feature ID: 2806367

Scott is a census-designated place (CDP) and unincorporated community located in Bolivar County, Mississippi, United States on Mississippi Highway 1. Scott is approximately 5 miles (8.0 km) north of Lamont and approximately 7 miles (11 km) south of Benoit.

Scott was formerly home to three general stores.

A post office first began operation under the name Scott in 1907.

In 1927, Delta & Pine Land Company established its headquarters in Scott.

Per the 2020 Census, the population was 90.

== Demographics ==
Historical population
Census	Pop.	Note	%±
2020	90		—
U.S. Decennial Census; 2020

Scott was first listed as a census designated place in the 2020 U.S. census.

=== 2020 census ===
Scott CDP, Mississippi – Racial and ethnic composition Note: the US Census treats Hispanic/Latino as an ethnic category. This table excludes Latinos from the racial categories and assigns them to a separate category. Hispanics/Latinos may be of any race.
Race / Ethnicity (NH = Non-Hispanic)	Pop 2020	% 2020
White alone (NH)	50	55.56%
Black or African American alone (NH)	39	43.33%
Native American or Alaska Native alone (NH)	0	0.00%
Asian alone (NH)	0	0.00%
Pacific Islander alone (NH)	0	0.00%
Some Other Race alone (NH)	0	0.00%
Mixed Race or Multi-Racial (NH)	0	0.00%
Hispanic or Latino (any race)	1	1.11%
Total	90	100.00%

== Education ==
It is a part of the West Bolivar Consolidated School District. It was formerly in the Benoit School District. The Benoit district merged into the West Bolivar district in 2014. The only K-12 school of the Benoit district, Ray Brooks School, operated until 2020. From 1986 until 2000 Benoit School District sent high school students to West Bolivar High School of the West Bolivar district.

== Notable people ==
- Big Bill Broonzy, blues musician
- Geraldine Hines, Associate Justice of the Massachusetts Supreme Judicial Court from 2014 to 2017

== Gallery ==
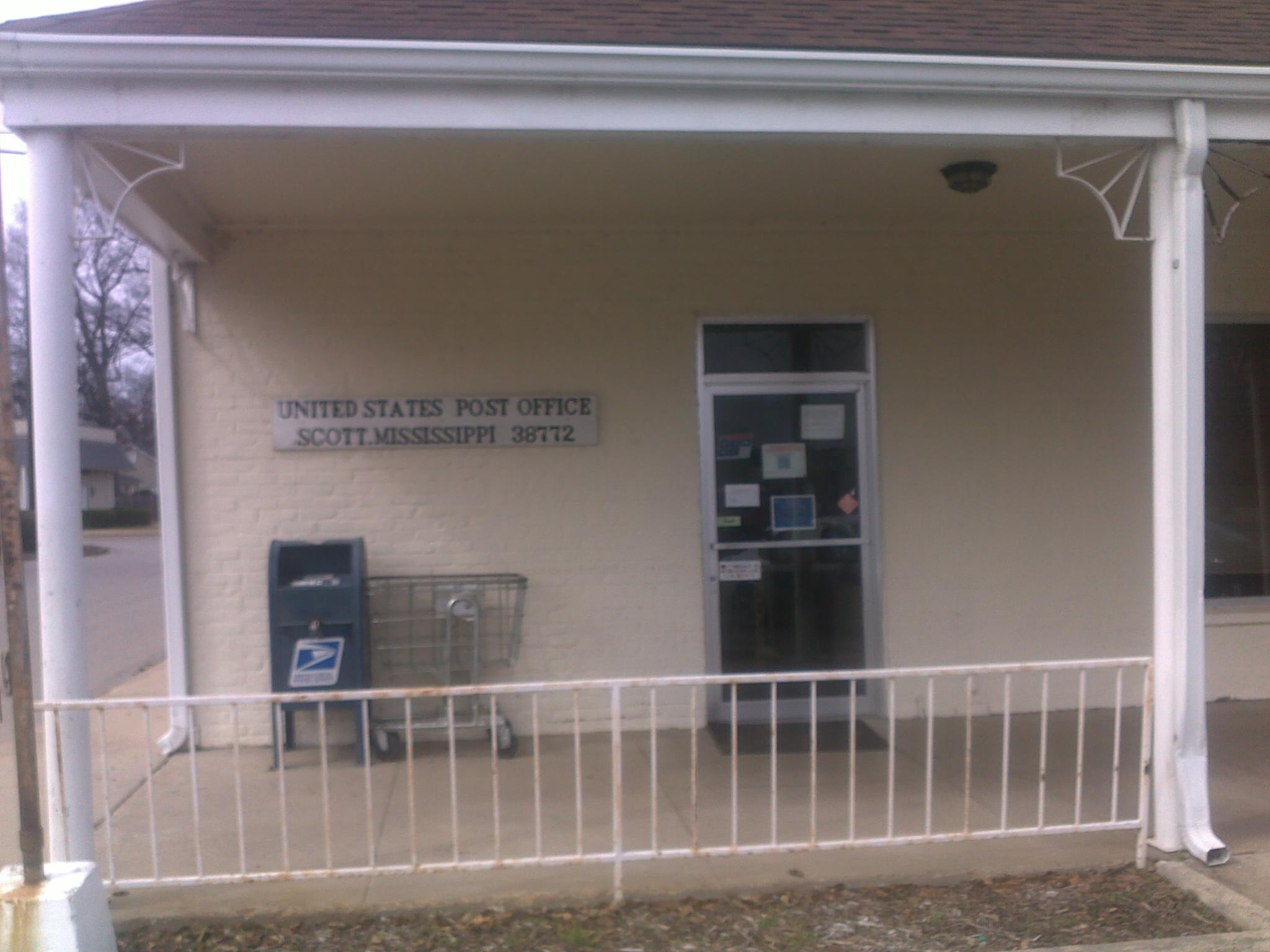
Post office in Scott

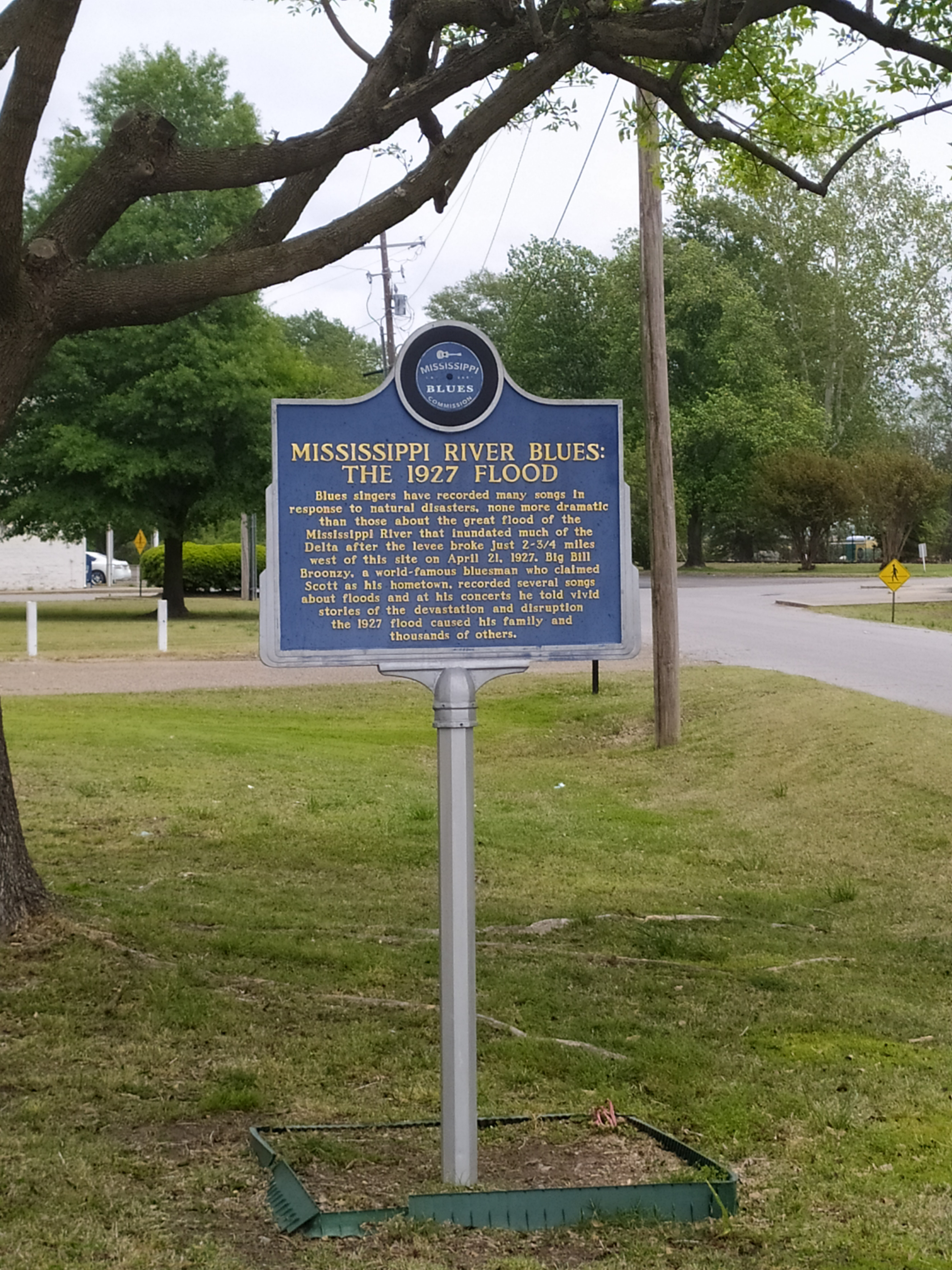
Mississippi Blues Trail marker in Scott

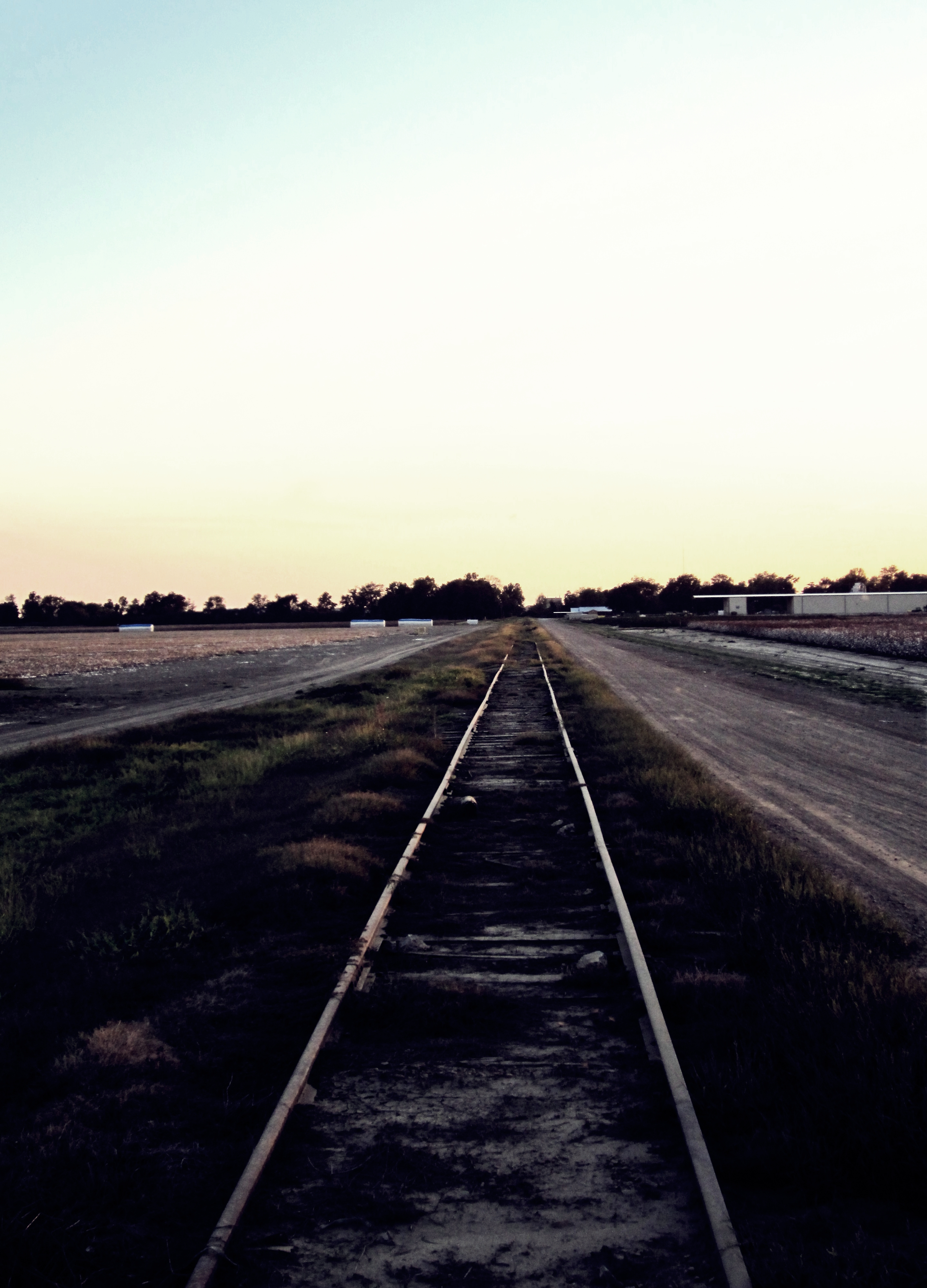
Looking south on Illinois Central Railroad towards Scott

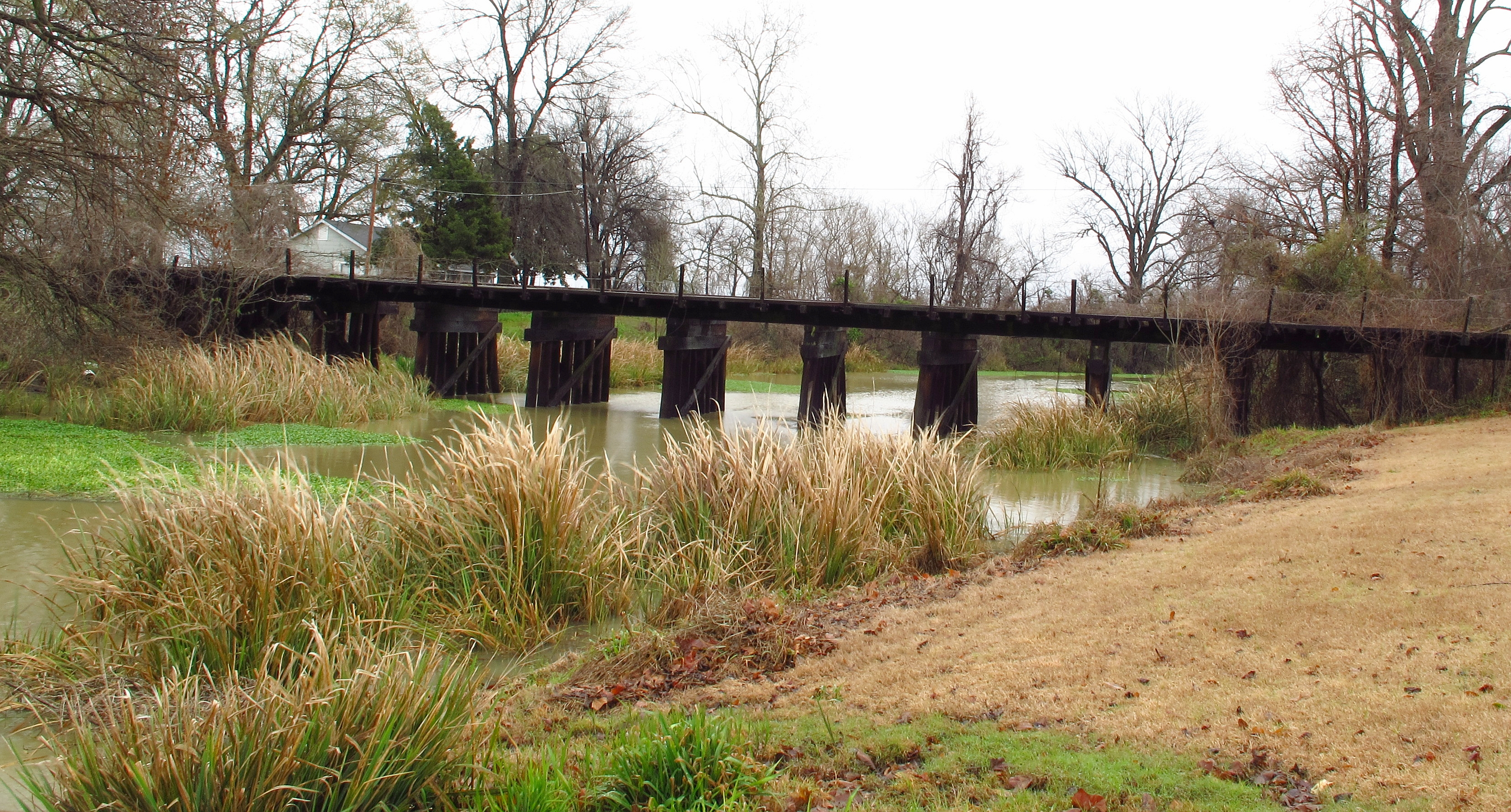
Bridge of abandoned Illinois Central Railroad line across Deer Creek in Scott
