= WBCSD =

WBCSD may refer to:

- World Business Council for Sustainable Development
- West Bolivar Consolidated School District
