= Hollywood (Benoit, Mississippi) =

Historic house in Mississippi, United States

- U.S. National Register of Historic Places
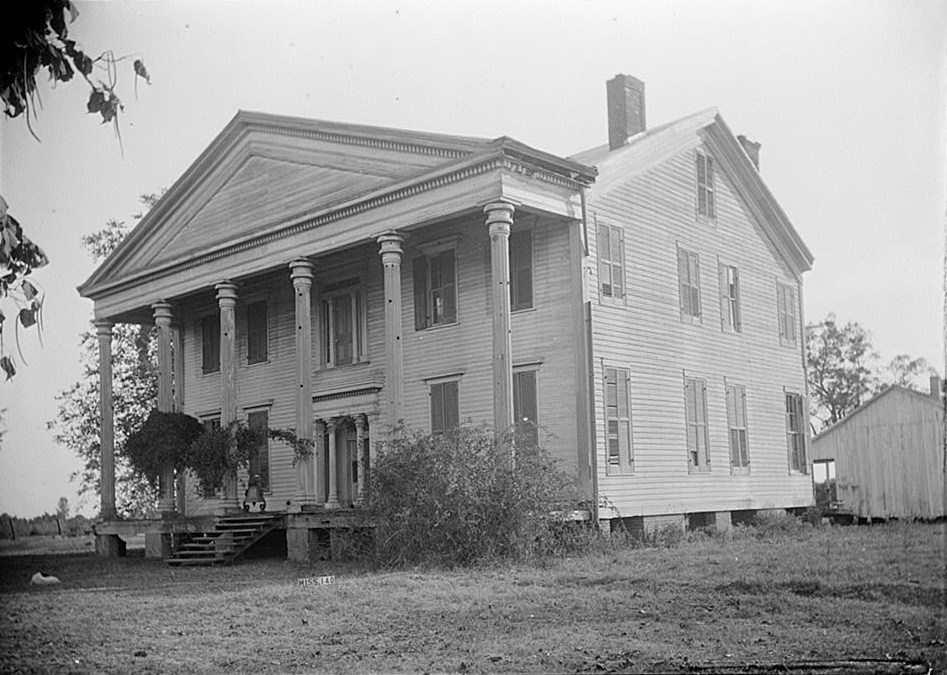
- Burrus House in 1936

- Location within Mississippi Location within the United States
- Nearest city: Benoit, Mississippi
- Coordinates: 33°38′23″N 91°0′17″W
- Area: 4 acres (1.6 ha)
- Built: 1858-61
- Architectural style: Greek Revival
- NRHP reference No.: 75001041
- Added to NRHP: April 1, 1975

Hollywood, also known as The Burrus House, is an antebellum Greek Revival plantation house near Benoit, Mississippi that was constructed for John C. Burrus between 1858 and 1861. It was listed in the National Register of Historic Places in 1975.

The Burrus House is the only surviving structure in Bolivar County, Mississippi associated with the once-prominent Burrus family.

The film Baby Doll was filmed there in 1956.
