= Baby Doll =

1956 American dramatic black comedy film by Elia Kazan

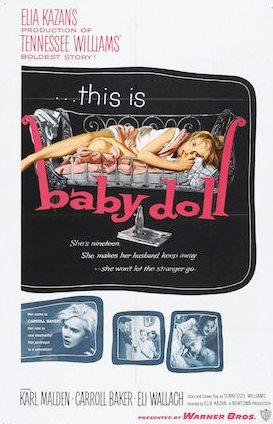
- Theatrical release poster
- Directed by: Elia Kazan
- Screenplay by: Tennessee Williams
- Based on: 27 Wagons Full of Cotton and The Long Stay Cut Short, or The Unsatisfactory Supper; 1946 plays by Tennessee Williams
- Produced by: Elia Kazan; Tennessee Williams
- Starring: Karl Malden; Carroll Baker; Eli Wallach
- Cinematography: Boris Kaufman
- Edited by: Gene Milford
- Music by: Kenyon Hopkins
- Production company: Newtown Productions
- Distributed by: Warner Bros. Pictures
- Release date: December 18, 1956
- Running time: 114 minutes
- Country: United States
- Language: English
- Budget: $1.3 million
- Box office: $2.3 million

Baby Doll is a 1956 American black comedy film directed by Elia Kazan and starring Carroll Baker, Karl Malden and Eli Wallach. It was produced by Kazan and Tennessee Williams, and adapted by Williams from two of his own one-act plays: 27 Wagons Full of Cotton and The Unsatisfactory Supper. The plot focuses on a feud between two rival cotton gin owners in rural Mississippi.

Filmed in Mississippi in late 1955, Baby Doll was released in December 1956. It provoked significant controversy, mostly because of its implied sexual themes, and the National Legion of Decency condemned the film.

Despite the moral objections, Baby Doll enjoyed a mostly favorable response from critics and earned numerous accolades, including the Golden Globe Award for Best Director for Kazan and nominations for four other Golden Globe awards, four Academy Awards and four BAFTA Awards. Wallach won the BAFTA award for Most Promising Newcomer.

Baby Doll has been listed by some film scholars as among the most notorious films of the 1950s, and The New York Times included it in its Guide to the Best 1,000 Movies Ever Made.

== Plot ==
In the Mississippi Delta, bigoted, middle-aged cotton gin owner Archie Lee Meighan has been married to pretty, naïve 19-year-old "Baby Doll" Meighan for nearly two years. As part of his marriage negotiation with Baby Doll's terminally ill (now-deceased) father, Archie promised to provide for her. Terms included setting her up at a restored "Tiger Tail," once the grandest house in the county but now in dilapidated condition. Long eagerly awaited by Archie, the next day is Baby Doll's 20th birthday, when according to the agreement, the marriage can finally be consummated. In the meantime, Baby Doll sleeps in a crib because the only other bedroom furniture in the house is the bed in which Archie sleeps. Archie, an alcoholic, spies on her through a hole in a wall. Baby Doll's senile Aunt Rose Comfort lives in the house as cook and housekeeper, much to Archie's chagrin.

Due to his failing cotton gin, Archie defaults on payments to a furniture company. When virtually all the furniture in the house is repossessed, Baby Doll threatens to leave, declaring a breach in the terms of the marriage agreement. Archie's competitor is a Sicilian-American named Silva Vacarro, manager of a newer, more modern, and more profitable cotton gin that has taken away all of Archie's business. The previous night, Archie retaliated by burning down Vacarro's gin. Suspecting Archie as the arsonist, Vacarro visits Archie's gin the following day with truckloads of cotton, feigning ignorance and "good will", offering to pay Archie Lee to gin for him.

Vacarro's foreman complains of the condition of the gin, which breaks down early in the process. Vacarro insists that Archie go some distance away to obtain the needed replacement part. Before departing, an obsequious Archie asks Baby Doll to entertain Vacarro to placate him. Flirting with Baby Doll to determine the status of her marriage and her attitude toward Archie, Vacarro elicits an admission from her that Archie was away from home during the time the gin burnt down. When Vacarro outright declares that Archie burnt down his gin, an alarmed Baby Doll runs to Archie at the mill for protection, but an impatient and irritable Archie slaps her in the face and leaves to purchase new parts for his gin. Vacarro comforts Baby Doll, confusing and arousing her innocence with sexual advances. When she retreats, he chases her through the house to a crumbling attic, where she attempts to elude him by climbing onto rotted planks that begin to collapse under her weight. As a price for bracing her from falling through the floorboards, Vacarro forces her to sign an affidavit admitting Archie's guilt. Tired from the previous night's and that morning's proceedings, Vacarro announces he's going home to nap, but Baby Doll offers her crib for his nap. Settling to sleep on the floor next to the crib, she sheds her dress to sleep in her slip.

When a drunken Archie returns and sees Baby Doll wandering around in her slip, with Vacarro making himself at home upstairs in her room, he is angry but impotent to confront Vacarro directly. Taking his anger out on Aunt Rose, he blames her for having left Baby Doll alone in the house to go visit a friend in the hospital and angrily tells Aunt Rose to move out of the house. Vacarro immediately offers to let her live with him as his cook. Baby Doll encourages Aunt Rose to accept, implying that she herself might join them in the future. As Archie seethes at the implications, Vacarro and Baby Doll openly flirt with each other to taunt him. After Vacarro confronts Archie with the affidavit, Archie retrieves his shotgun and chases Vacarro outside while Baby Doll calls the police.

The police arrive, and Archie is arrested when Vacarro presents them with the affidavit. Vacarro then leaves the property, telling Baby Doll he will be back the following day with more cotton. Archie is taken away by the police, remarking bitterly that it is now past midnight and Baby Doll's 20th birthday. Baby Doll and her Aunt Rose return inside the house to await Vacarro's return, hoping he will remember them.

== Cast ==
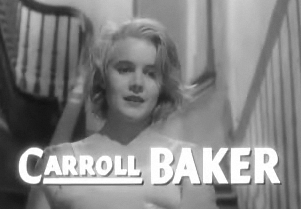
Carroll Baker plays Baby Doll Meighan

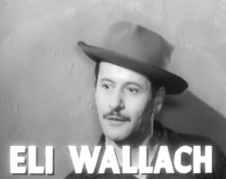
Eli Wallach plays Silva Vacarro

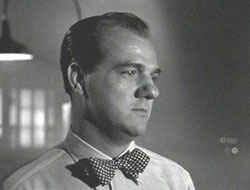
Karl Malden plays Archie Lee Meighan

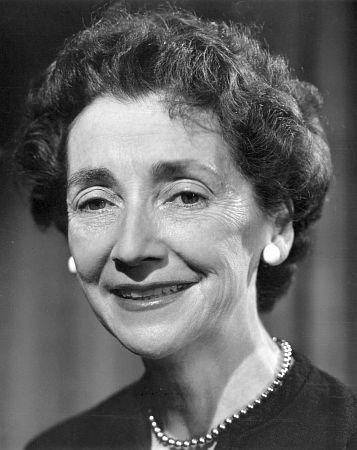
Mildred Dunnock plays Aunt Rose Comfort

- Karl Malden as Archie Lee Meighan
- Carroll Baker as Baby Doll Meighan
- Eli Wallach as Silva Vacarro
- Mildred Dunnock as Aunt Rose Comfort
- Lonny Chapman as Rock
- Eades Hogue as Town Marshal
- Noah Williamson as Deputy
- R. G. Armstrong as Townsman Sid (voice only, uncredited)
- Madeleine Sherwood as Nurse in Doctor's Office (uncredited)
- Rip Torn as Dentist (uncredited)

== Production ==
=== Development ===
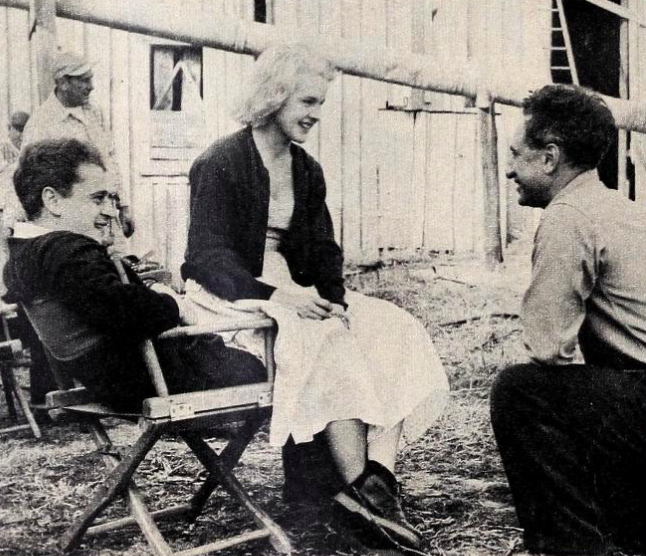
Jack Garfein, Carroll Baker, and Elia Kazan on the set of Baby Doll

Although the film's title card reads "Tennessee Williams' Baby Doll" and the film is based on Williams' one-act play 27 Wagons Full of Cotton, Elia Kazan claimed in his autobiography that Williams was only "half-heartedly" involved in the screenplay and that Kazan actually wrote most of it.

=== Casting ===
Kazan cast Baby Doll using numerous alumni of the Actors Studio, including each of the principal cast members. Carroll Baker was Kazan's first choice for the title role, although Williams had considered Marilyn Monroe for the part. Williams favored Baker after she performed a scene from his script at the Actors Studio. Kazan had been impressed by her performance in All Summer Long on Broadway the year prior.

Eli Wallach was cast in his first screen role but was hesitant, as he was unfamiliar with film acting and lacked confidence in his ability.

Although racial segregation was still present in Mississippi at the time, several local black actors appear in bit parts.

Actors Studio alumnus Rip Torn appears in an uncredited role as a dentist.

=== Filming ===
Principal photography began in October 1955 in Benoit, Mississippi at the J.C. Burrus house, an 1848 antebellum home in Bolivar County. Kazan asked the actors to dress the home's interiors with props that they felt reflected their characters' personalities. Other shooting locations included nearby Greenville, Mississippi and New York City. According to Kazan, Williams did not stay long while the film was shooting in Benoit because of the way locals looked at him. Some locals were used for minor roles, and one called "Boll Weevil" acted and also served as the production unit's utility man.

The working titles for the film included the name of the play and Mississippi Woman. Baker claims that Kazan changed the title to Baby Doll as a present to her.

== Release ==
=== Critical response ===
Reviews from critics were mostly positive. Bosley Crowther of The New York Times wrote in a generally favorable review that Tennessee Williams "has written his trashy, vicious people so that they are clinically interesting...But Mr. Kazan's pictorial compositions, got in stark black-and-white and framed for the most part against the background of an old Mississippi mansion, are by far the most artful and respectable feature of 'Baby Doll.'" Variety wrote that Kazan "probably here turns in his greatest directing job to date" and praised the "superb performances," concluding that the film "ranks as a major screen achievement and deserves to be recognized as such." Richard L. Coe of The Washington Post called it "one of the finest films of this or many another year, a chilling expose of what ignorance does to human beings...and an excellent example of why the Motion Picture Association should follow Britain's lead in classifying films into distinct categories for children and adults." John McCarten of The New Yorker praised the cast as "uniformly commendable" and wrote that the plot machinations "add up to some hilarious French-style farce, and it is only at the conclusion of the piece, when Mr. Kazan starts moving his camera around in a preternaturally solemn way, that one's interest in 'Baby Doll' briefly wanes." The Monthly Film Bulletin wrote "Kazan has often fallen afoul of his own cleverness, but in Baby Doll he responds to a brilliant and astute scenario by Tennessee Williams with a great invention and the most subtle insight...There are no bad performances, and those of Carroll Baker as Baby Doll and Eli Wallach as the Sicilian are outstanding."

Not all reviews were positive. Edwin Schallert of the Los Angeles Times wrote that the film "offers an experience so basically sordid, and so trying besides, that if one does not manage to laugh at its fantastic ribaldry, he will think that he has spent two hours in bedlam." Harrison's Reports called the film "thoroughly unpleasant and distasteful screen fare, in spite of the fact that it is expertly directed and finely acted."

The film holds a score of 83% on the review-aggregation website Rotten Tomatoes based on 23 reviews.

=== Box office ===
In its review of the film Variety wrote the film "should make a barrell of dough." Baby Doll premiered in New York City on December 18, 1956, opening the following week in Los Angeles on December 26 before receiving an expanded release on December 29. During its opening week at New York's Victoria Theater, the film earned promising box-office returns, totaling $51,232.

However the film struggled to receive bookings in the wake of Catholic opposition (discussed below). In May 1957 Kazan claimed that the film would ultimately earn $5 million worldwide and had already grossed $3 million, and estimated his production company, Newtown, would make $1 million from the film. However, according to Variety the film earned rentals of $2.3 million at the North American box office in 1957. Kazan later wrote in his memoirs, "People were reading that the film was breaking box office records. This was not true; the cardinal's attack hurt us. There'd be one good week, then a quick slide down. I never made a profit."

Filmink argued this box office failure was in part because Carroll Baker's character "clearly doesn’t want to have sex with anyone. Baby Doll is basically a child who Eli Wallach seduces through manipulation and guile. Maybe if Wallach had been played by a conventionally sexy actor... and/or Baker was more knowing, there would be an entirely different reading of the movie. As it is, Baby Doll is basically a film about a victim. The film was marketed as something titillating but when you watch it, the end result is far more complex."

== Accolades ==
Institution	Category	Recipient(s)	Result	Ref.
Academy Awards	Best Actress	Carroll Baker	Nominated	
Academy Awards	Best Supporting Actress	Mildred Dunnock	Nominated	
Academy Awards	Best Adapted Screenplay	Tennessee Williams	Nominated	
Academy Awards	Best Black-and-White Cinematography	Boris Kaufman	Nominated	
BAFTA Awards	Most Promising Newcomer	Eli Wallach	Won	
BAFTA Awards	Best Film	Baby Doll	Nominated	
BAFTA Awards	Best Foreign Actor	Karl Malden	Nominated	
BAFTA Awards	Best Foreign Actress	Carroll Baker	Nominated	
Golden Globe Awards	Best Director	Elia Kazan	Won	
Golden Globe Awards	Best Actor – Drama	Karl Malden	Nominated	
Golden Globe Awards	Best Actress – Drama	Carroll Baker	Nominated	
Golden Globe Awards	New Star of the Year	Carroll Baker	Won	
Golden Globe Awards	Best Supporting Actor	Eli Wallach	Nominated	
Golden Globe Awards	Best Supporting Actress	Mildred Dunnock	Nominated	
WGA Awards	Best Written American Drama – Screen	Tennessee Williams	Nominated	

== Controversies ==
=== Claims of indecency ===
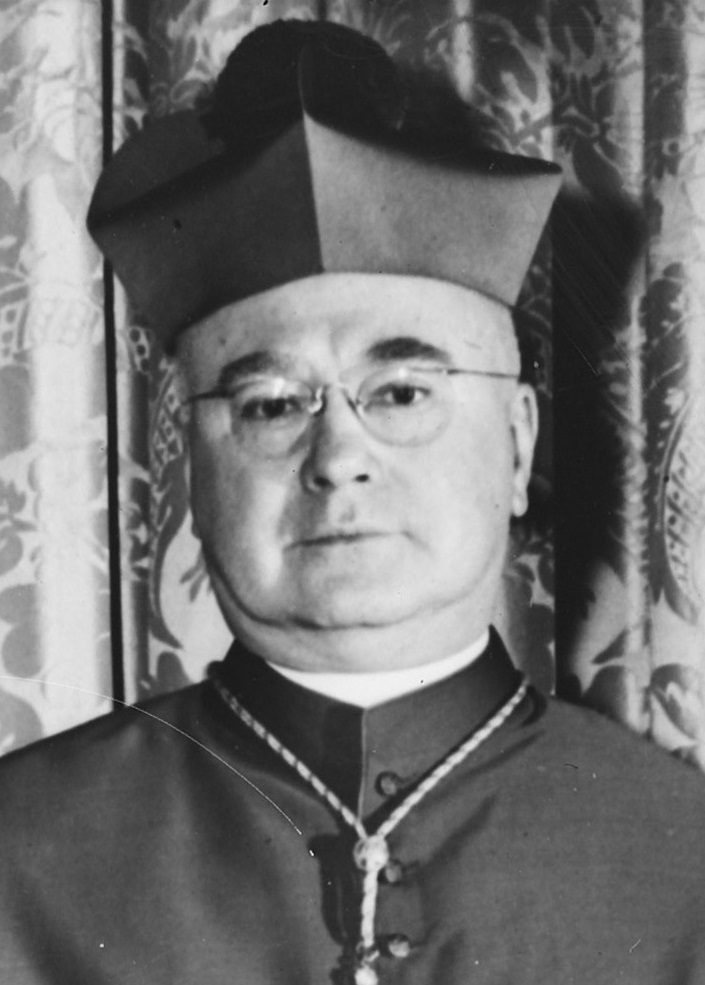
Cardinal Francis Spellman, Archbishop of New York, protested the film.

Baby Doll courted controversy before its release with the display of a promotional billboard in New York City that depicted Baker lying in a crib and sucking her thumb. Cardinal Spellman urged both Catholics and non-Catholics to avoid the film, deeming it a moral danger.

Although Baby Doll received a seal of approval from the MPAA, Motion Picture Herald criticized the approval, noting: "Both the general principles of the Code and several specific stipulations are tossed aside in granting the film a Code seal. Among these, the law is ridiculed, there are sexual implications, vulgarity, and the words 'wop' and 'nigger.'" Religious groups continued to apply pressure following the film's December 18, 1956 premiere, and the Catholic Legion of Decency rated the film as a "C" ("Condemned") and deemed it "grievously offensive to Christian and traditional standards of morality and decency." The group succeeded in having the film withdrawn from numerous theaters. Variety noted that it was the first time in years that the Legion of Decency had condemned a major American film that had been approved by the MPAA.

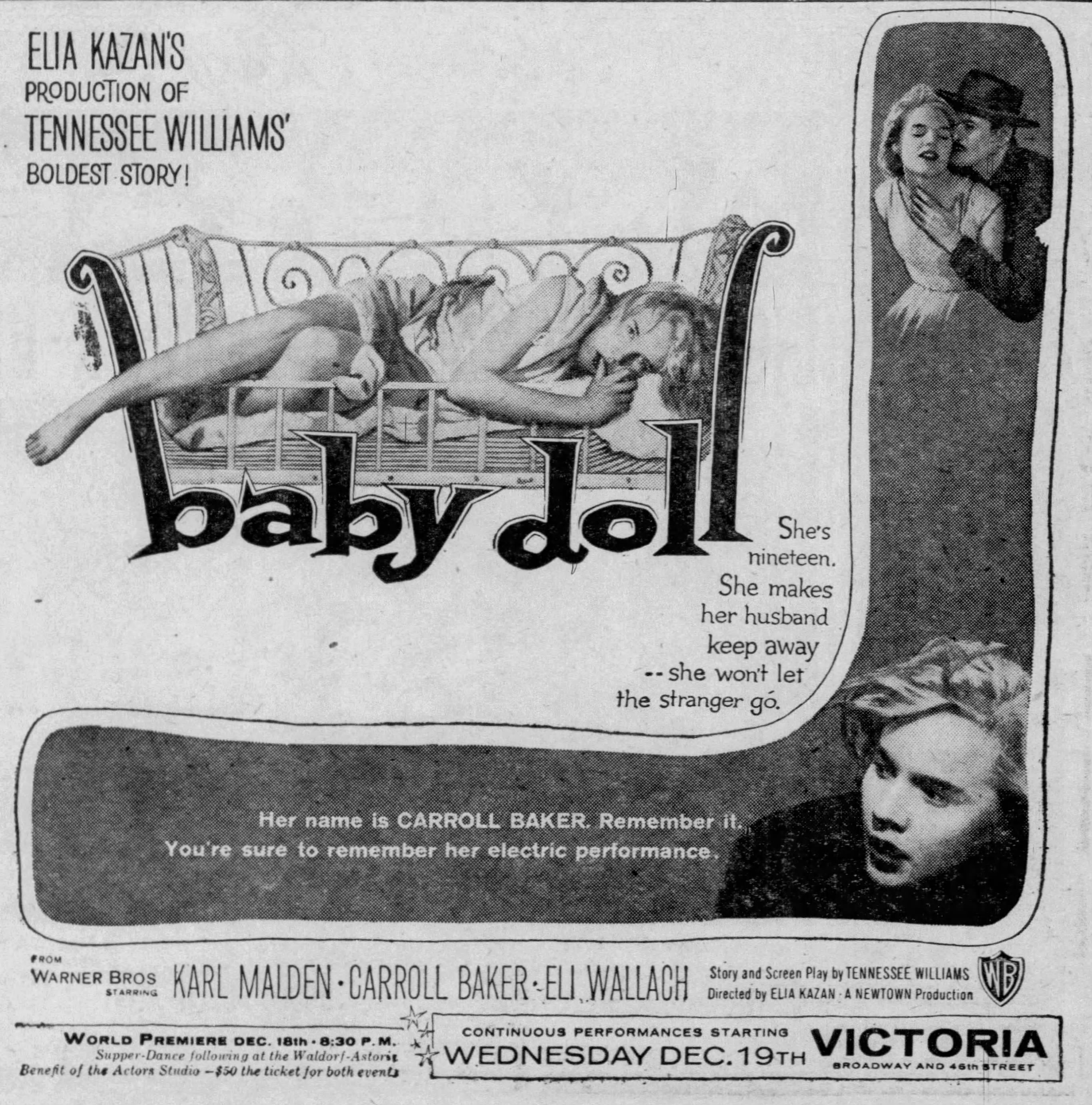
Theatrical advertisement from 1956

Response to the film from Catholic laity was mixed.

Episcopal bishop James A. Pike argued that The Ten Commandments contained more "sensuality" than did Baby Doll.

According to Baker, the cast and crew were unaware that the material would be perceived as controversial. The main reason for the backlash was believed to be the seduction scene between Baker and Wallach. Speculation arose among some audiences that during their scene together on a swinging chair, Wallach's character was fondling Baby Doll underneath her dress because his hands are not visible in the frame. According to both Baker and Wallach, the scene was intentionally filmed as such because Kazan had placed heaters all around them in the cold weather.

The film was banned in many countries, because of "exaggerated sexual content." It also was condemned by Time, which called it "just possibly the dirtiest American-made motion picture that has ever been legally exhibited." Such heated objections and the ensuing publicity earned Baby Doll a reputation as one of the most notorious films of the 1950s.

== Stage play ==
In the 1970s, Williams wrote the full-length stage play Tiger Tail, based on his screenplay for Baby Doll. The screenplay and stage play have been published in one volume. In 2015, the McCarter Theatre in Princeton, New Jersey, premiered a stage version of Baby Doll, adapted by Emily Mann, the theater's artistic director, and Pierre Laville, who had written an earlier version that premiered at the Théâtre de l’Atelier in Paris in 2009. The latest adaptation supplemented parts of the film script with material based on several others of Williams' works, including Tiger Tail.

== See also ==
- List of American films of 1956

== Sources ==
- Baker, Carroll (1983). Baby Doll: An Autobiography. New York City, New York: Arbor House. ISBN 978-0-87795-558-0.
- Palmer, R. Barton; Bray, William Robert (2009). Hollywood's Tennessee: The Williams Films and Postwar America. Austin, Texas: University of Texas Press. ISBN 978-0-292-71921-7.
- Haberski, Raymond J. (2007). Freedom to Offend: How New York Remade Movie Culture. Lexington, Kentucky: University Press of Kentucky. ISBN 978-0-813-13841-1.
- Murphy, Brenda (1992). Tennessee Williams and Elia Kazan: A Collaboration in the Theatre. Cambridge, England: Cambridge University Press. ISBN 978-0-521-40095-4.
- Wallach, Eli (2014) [2006]. The Good, the Bad, and Me: In My Anecdotage. Boston: Mariner Books. ISBN 978-0-544-53578-7.
