= Shaw School District =

School district in Mississippi, United States

The Shaw School District was a public school district based in Shaw, Mississippi (USA). The district served the Bolivar County portion of the city; the small portion of the city that lies in Sunflower County was and is served by the Sunflower County School District. On July 1, 2014, the Shaw School District was consolidated into the West Bolivar Consolidated School District.

The district served Shaw and Skene.

The district operated two schools, Shaw High School and McEvans School (elementary-middle school).

== History ==
In 2012 the Mississippi Legislature passed a bill that required five school districts in Bolivar County to consolidate into two larger ones. On July 1, 2014, the Shaw School District was consolidated into the West Bolivar Consolidated School District.

== Demographics ==
The district had about 960 students sometime before or in 2003.

=== 2006-07 school year ===
There were a total of 668 students enrolled in the Shaw School District during the 2006-2007 school year. The gender makeup of the district was 50% female and 50% male. The racial makeup of the district was 98.65% African American, 0.60% White, and 0.75% Hispanic. 95.2% of the district's students were eligible to receive free lunch.

=== Previous school years ===
School Year	Enrollment	Gender Makeup		Racial Makeup				
School Year	Enrollment	Female	Male	Asian	African American	Hispanic	Native American	White
2005-06	697	49%	51%	–	98.28%	0.86%	–	0.86%
2004-05	718	50%	50%	–	98.61%	0.97%	–	0.42%
2003-04	728	51%	49%	–	98.35%	0.69%	–	0.96%
2002-03	740	50%	50%	–	98.51%	0.68%	–	0.81%

== Accountability statistics ==
	2006-07	2005-06	2004-05	2003-04	2002-03
District Accreditation Status	Accredited	Accredited	Accredited	Accredited	Accredited
School Performance Classifications
Level 5 (Superior Performing) Schools	0	0	0	0	0
Level 4 (Exemplary) Schools	0	0	0	1	1
Level 3 (Successful) Schools	2	2	2	1	1
Level 2 (Under Performing) Schools	0	0	0	0	0
Level 1 (Low Performing) Schools	0	0	0	0	0
Not Assigned	0	0	0	0	0

== See also ==
- List of school districts in Mississippi
