= Chet Morgan =

American baseball player (1910–1991)

- Morgan c. 1935
- Center fielder
- Born: June 6, 1910; Skene, Mississippi, U.S.
- Died: September 20, 1991 (aged 81); Pasadena, Texas, U.S.
- Batted: Left Threw: Right

MLB debut
- April 19, 1935, for the Detroit Tigers

Last MLB appearance
- September 29, 1938, for the Detroit Tigers

MLB statistics
- Games: 88
- On-base percentage: .330
- Batting average: .277
- Stats at Baseball Reference

Teams
- Detroit Tigers (1935, 1938)

Chester Collins Morgan (June 6, 1910 – September 20, 1991), nicknamed "Chick," was an American professional baseball player and manager. He played Major League Baseball, principally as a center fielder, for the Detroit Tigers during the 1935 and 1938 seasons.

== Early years ==
Morgan was born in Skene, Mississippi, in 1910.

== Professional baseball ==
Morgan began playing professional baseball in the Texas League with the Beaumont Exporters from 1933 to 1934 and for the San Antonio Missions in 1934.

In April 1935, Morgan made his Major League Baseball debut with the Detroit Tigers. During the 1935 season, Morgan appeared in 14 games for the Tigers and compiled a .174 batting average and a .321 on-base percentage in 28 plate appearances.

Morgan spent most of the 1935 season with the Toledo Mud Hens of the American Association. He played for the Milwaukee Brewers in 1936 before returning to the Mud Hens in 1937 and 1938.

In 1938, Morgan returned to Major League Baseball with the Tigers. He appeared in 74 games for the 1938 Tigers, including 69 games as the team's starting center fielder. He compiled a .284 batting average and .330 on-base percentage in 1938. He played in 88 games for the Tigers in his career and had a batting average of .277 with a .330 on-base percentage.

Although he appeared in his last major league game in 1938, he continued to play in the minors until 1950. He played for the Louisville Colonels from 1939 to 1943, the Toronto Maple Leafs from 1944 to 1946, and the Clarksdale Planters from 1948 to 1950. He also served as Clarksdale's manager from 1948 to 1950.

In May 1953, he was hired as the manager of the Greenville Bucks of the Cotton States League.

== Later years ==
Morgan died in 1991 at age 81 in Pasadena, Texas.
