= Besmilr Brigham =

American writer (1913–2000)

Besmilr Brigham (born Bess Miller Moore; September 28, 1913 – September 30, 2000) was an American poet and writer of short stories.

Brigham was born in Pace, Mississippi. She graduated from Mary Hardin-Baylor College (now University of Mary Hardin–Baylor) in Belton, Texas. After that, she studied at the New School for Social Research in New York. In New York she met and married Roy Brigham.

According to the Encyclopedia of Arkansas History & Culture, "She came to prominence during the women’s movement of the 1960s, and her work is noted for its innovative structure, sound, and rhythm."

Brigham is also known as Besmilr Moore Brigham. The Besmilr Women Writers Award is named after her.

Brigham died of complications from Alzheimer's disease in Las Cruces, New Mexico in 2000.

== Works ==
- 1969. Agony dance: death of the dancing dolls (poetry)
- 2000. Run through rock: selected short poems of Besmilr Brigham (C. D. Wright, ed.)
- 1971. Heaved from the earth. (poetry)
