= Ray Brooks School =

Location
- 1827 Hwy 1 Benoit address, Mississippi 38725; United States
- Coordinates: 33.6367°N 91.0276°W

Information
- School type: Public
- Opened: 1959
- Closed: 2020
- School district: West Bolivar Consolidated School District (2014-2020); Benoit School District (1959-2014)
- Grades: K-12 (2001-2020); K-9(1986-2001); 1-12/K-12(1959-1986)
- Website: www.wbcsdk12.org/ray-brooks-school

Ray Brooks School was a K-12 school in unincorporated Bolivar County, Mississippi, near Benoit. In September 2015 it had 214 students. Its namesake was its first principal, Ray Brooks; it was originally known as the Nugent Center School, and until 2014 was the only school of the Benoit School District, which served Benoit and Scott. From 2014 until 2020, it was a part of the West Bolivar Consolidated School District. Ray Brooks School closed in 2020.

== History ==
The school built in 1959, originally served grades 1-12. It was also known as Benoit High School. In 1986 it was redesignated as a Kindergarten through 9th grade school. High school students were assigned to West Bolivar High School of the West Bolivar School District, in Rosedale.

In 1998 the school received its current name. In 1999 it had 320 students, and in 2000 it had 268 students; that year principal Barbara Akon described it as the smallest school in the state.

High school classes resumed in 2001. Linda Coleman, a Democratic member of the Mississippi House of Representatives from Mound Bayou, stated that the costs of transporting children to West Bolivar from Benoit were too high. The first high school class of that generation graduated in 2002. In 2002 the school was the second smallest school in the state.

It was operated by the Benoit School District until July 1, 2014, when that district was consolidated into West Bolivar Consolidated.

In 2020 there were a total of 161 students with each grade level having 20 or fewer students.

In 2020 the West Bolivar board voted to close Ray Brooks on a 3 to 2 basis due to declining tax revenue and enrollment district wide, with Ray Brooks chosen to close as it was more distant and because, of the options, the fewest children would have changes to their schooling. This is despite the school building perceived to be in better condition than others, with it being larger and newer than others. The two board members of the Rosedale area and one board member of the Shaw area, school board president Jackie Lloyd, voted to close Ray Brooks. The closure reflects a population loss occurring in the Mississippi Delta area. Tamara Lopez of Delta News TV stated "Residents in Benoit had mixed reactions to the announcement, some angry others sad."
