= Benoit School District =

School district in Mississippi, United States

Coordinates: 33.636891°N 91.027492°W

Location
- Bolivar County, Mississippi; United States

District information
- Closed: 2014

The Benoit School District (BSD) was a public school district serving, in Bolivar County, Mississippi (USA): Benoit, Scott, and areas around those two settlements.

The sole school of the district was the Ray Brooks School (Grades PK-12), in unincorporated Bolivar County. The district headquarters was previously in a building in Benoit. Later it was in Ray Brooks itself.

On July 1, 2014, the district consolidated into the West Bolivar Consolidated School District. Ray Brooks itself continued to operate until its 2020 closure.

== History ==
Beginning in 1986 district students at the high school level did not attend Ray Brooks (previously Nugent Center School, a.k.a. Benoit High School), but instead West Bolivar High School of the West Bolivar School District, in Rosedale. However high school classes at Ray Brooks resumed in 2001. Linda Coleman, a Democratic member of the Mississippi House of Representatives from Mound Bayou, stated that the costs of transporting children to West Bolivar from Benoit were too high.

In 2012 the Mississippi Legislature passed a bill that required five school districts in Bolivar County to consolidate into two larger ones. On July 1, 2014, the Benoit district consolidated into the West Bolivar Consolidated School District. West Bolivar closed Ray Brooks in 2020.

== Demographics ==
The school district had 287 students as of 2012. As of that year, of the 152 school districts in the State of Mississippi, Benoit was the smallest K-12 district (meaning the smallest which had all thirteen grade levels) and one of the 20 smallest school districts overall in the state.

== Accountability statistics ==
As of 2012, the district was, on a state seven step accountability rating, given the third lowest, "low performing," due to test scores. As of the same year the school had a 92% graduation rate, which is much higher than the Mississippi state average.

== School uniforms ==
Students were required to wear school uniforms.

== See also ==
- List of school districts in Mississippi
