= West Bolivar High School =

Location
- 1213 Main Street; Rosedale, Mississippi 38769; United States; 33.84722°N 91.02641°W

Information
- Former name: Rosedale Consolidated School
- Type: Public high school
- School district: West Bolivar Consolidated School District
- Staff: 17.52 (FTE)
- Grades: 7–12
- Enrollment: 234 (2022-2023)
- Student to teacher ratio: 13.36
- Colors: Red, white, and blue
- Team name: Eagles
- Website: wbhs.wbcsdk12.org

West Bolivar High School is a senior high school in Rosedale, Mississippi, and a part of the West Bolivar Consolidated School District (formerly the West Bolivar School District).

In addition to Rosedale it serves Gunnison, Pace, and Symonds, and from 1986 to 2000 it served high school-aged residents of Benoit and Scott. It was formerly known as Rosedale Consolidated School.

== History ==
The school, previously known as the Rosedale Consolidated School, opened in 1921. It was founded during the Jim Crow era, and was a segregated white school. In the Lum v. Rice case a Chinese student, Martha Lum, unsuccessfully tried to enroll in classes at Rosedale Consolidated in the 1920s. The school became racially integrated in 1970.

Beginning in 1986 Benoit School District students at the high school level did not attend Ray Brooks School (previously Nugent Center School, a.k.a. Benoit High School), which continued to serve prior grades, but instead West Bolivar High. However high school classes at Ray Brooks resumed in 2000. Linda Coleman, a Democratic member of the Mississippi House of Representatives from Mound Bayou, stated that the costs of transporting children to West Bolivar from Benoit were too high.

Previously West Bolivar HS was at 505 North Main Street. In 2020 the district decided to move West Bolivar High into the West Bolivar Middle complex, at 1213 South Main Street. West Bolivar High School moved to Building B of West Bolivar Middle. Now West Bolivar High is a unified 7-12 school. at 1213 South Main Street. The unified 7-12 high school occupies the former middle school building.

== Campus ==
The pre-2020 building uses a Spanish architectural style.
