= Scott L. Kafker =

American judge (born 1959)

Scott Kafker
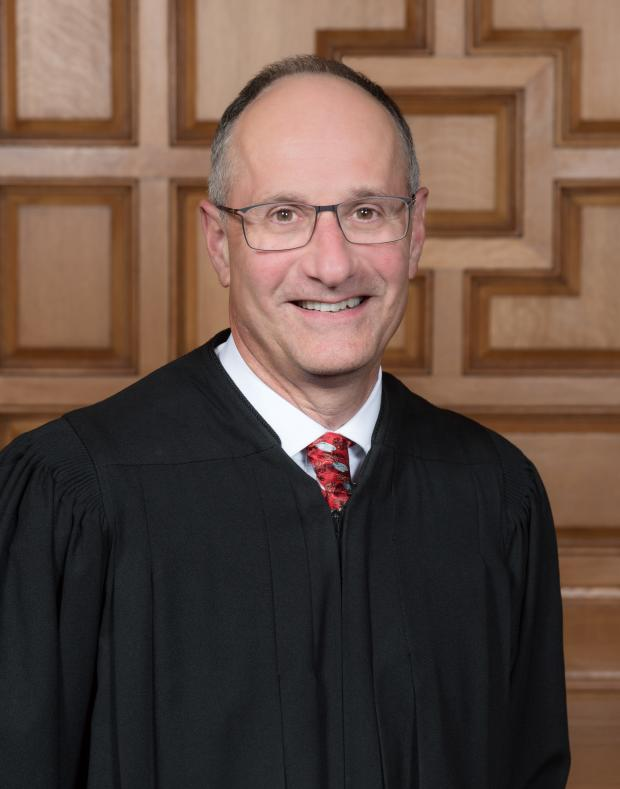

Associate Justice of the Massachusetts Supreme Judicial Court
- Incumbent
- Assumed office August 21, 2017
- Appointed by: Charlie Baker
- Preceded by: Geraldine Hines

Personal details
- Born: April 24, 1959 (age 66)
- Education: Amherst College (BA); University of Chicago (JD)

Scott Lewis Kafker (born April 24, 1959) is an associate justice of the Supreme Judicial Court of Massachusetts and the former Chief Justice of the Massachusetts Appeals Court.

== Biography ==
Kafker graduated from Amherst College with a Bachelor of Arts in 1981 and from the University of Chicago Law School with a J.D. degree in 1985, where he was on the University of Chicago Law Review. He served as a law clerk to Justice Charles L. Levin of the Michigan Supreme Court and Judge Mark L. Wolf of the United States District Court for the District of Massachusetts. After clerking, he entered private practice as an associate at the Boston law firm of Foley, Hoag & Eliot, where he worked on labor and employment cases and other commercial disputes. During the administration of Governor Bill Weld, Kafker served as deputy chief legal counsel to the governor and chief legal counsel for the Massachusetts Port Authority.

=== Judicial service ===
In 2001, Kafker was appointed to the Massachusetts Appeals Court. He was appointed chief justice of that court on July 22, 2015. During his time on the appeals court, Kafker wrote close to 1,000 decisions.

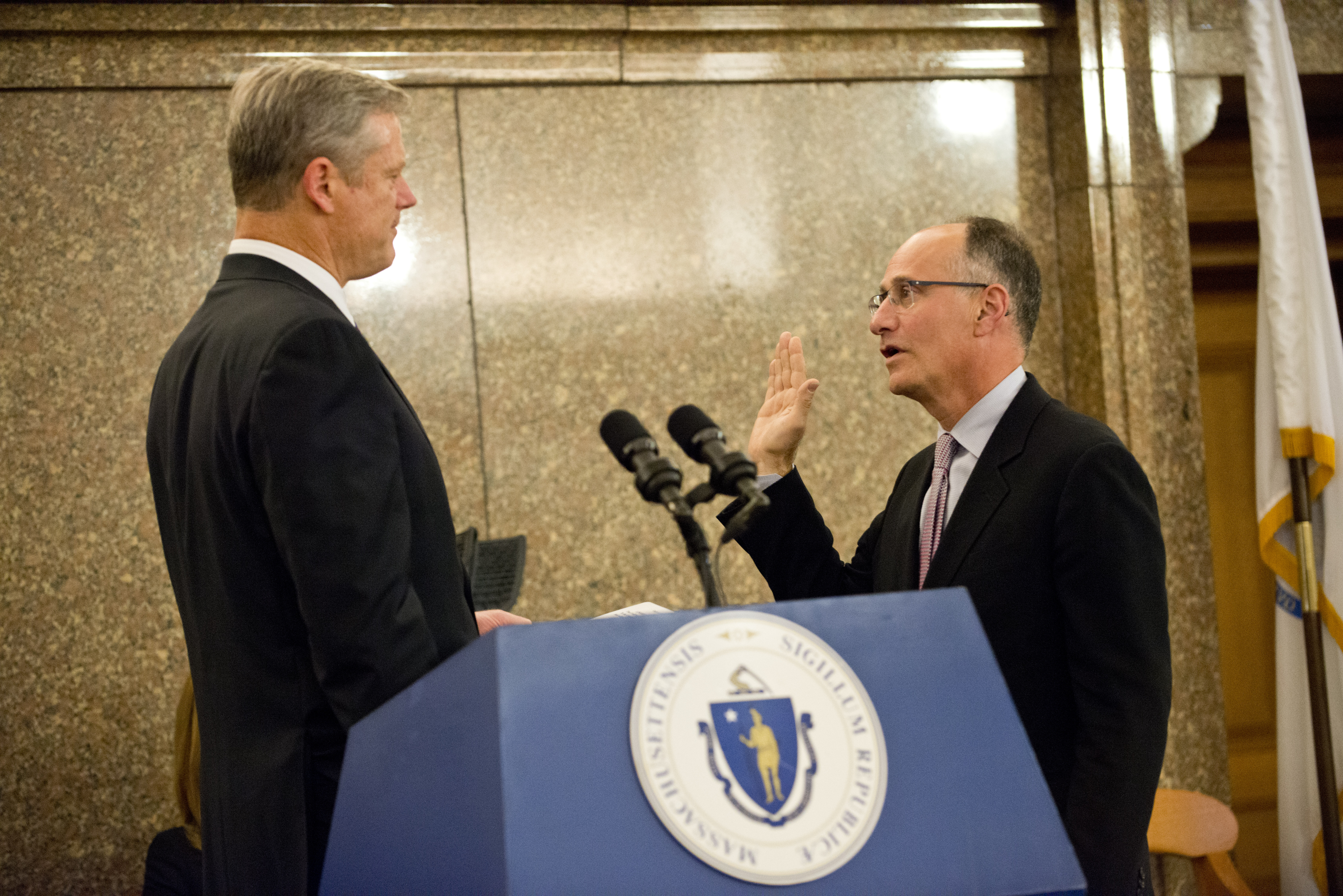
Kafker being sworn-in to the Supreme Judicial Court by Governor Charlie Baker

On June 26, 2017, Kafker was nominated by Governor Charlie Baker to replace retiring Justice Geraldine Hines on the Supreme Judicial Court. He was Governor Baker's fifth nominee for the seven-member court. Kafker was confirmed the following month by a unanimous vote of the Governor's Council.

==== Hydro-Québec Energy Project ====
In September 2020, the Supreme Judicial Court unanimously denied a legal challenge to power purchase agreements for hydroelectric power between Massachusetts utilities and Hydro-Québec Energy Services. The agreements called for clean electricity generated in Canada to be transmitted to Massachusetts via a transmission line running from Québec to Maine.

Kafker's opinion for the court explained that the Massachusetts Department of Public Utilities had "reasonably and realistically" interpreted the applicable legal requirements in approving the agreements, and that the Department's decision was supported by "substantial evidence and sufficient rationale." The opinion is noteworthy in part for its brief discussion of the physics of electricity; Kafker's analysis noted that "[f]ortunately (for this court) the laws of physics are not in dispute."

The decision cleared the way for Massachusetts to import hydroelectric energy from Canada. However, the project relied on the construction of a 145-mile transmission line through western Maine. The transmission line has been stalled by other legal hurdles and political opposition in Maine, including a state-wide referendum in which Maine residents voted to halt the project.

==== Other notable cases ====
In March 2021, Kafker authored an opinion ruling that the ministerial exception—which shields religious institutions from discrimination lawsuits by employees carrying out religious functions—did not apply to a lawsuit filed by a former instructor at Gordon College, which is a private Christian institution. The instructor contended that she had been fired "on the basis of her association with LGBTQ+ persons or on the basis of her gender." Kafker explained that the instructor did not meet the definition of a "minister," in part because she was never ordained and never received formal religious training, and so the ministerial exception did not bar her lawsuit. The United States Supreme Court declined a request to review the decision, though four justices (Samuel Alito, Clarence Thomas, Brett Kavanaugh, and Amy Coney Barrett) expressed an interest in revisiting the scope of the ministerial exception in a future case.

Legal offices
Preceded by Geraldine Hines	Associate Justice of the Massachusetts Supreme Judicial Court; 2017–present	Incumbent
