= Ralph Gants =

American attorney and judge (1954–2020)

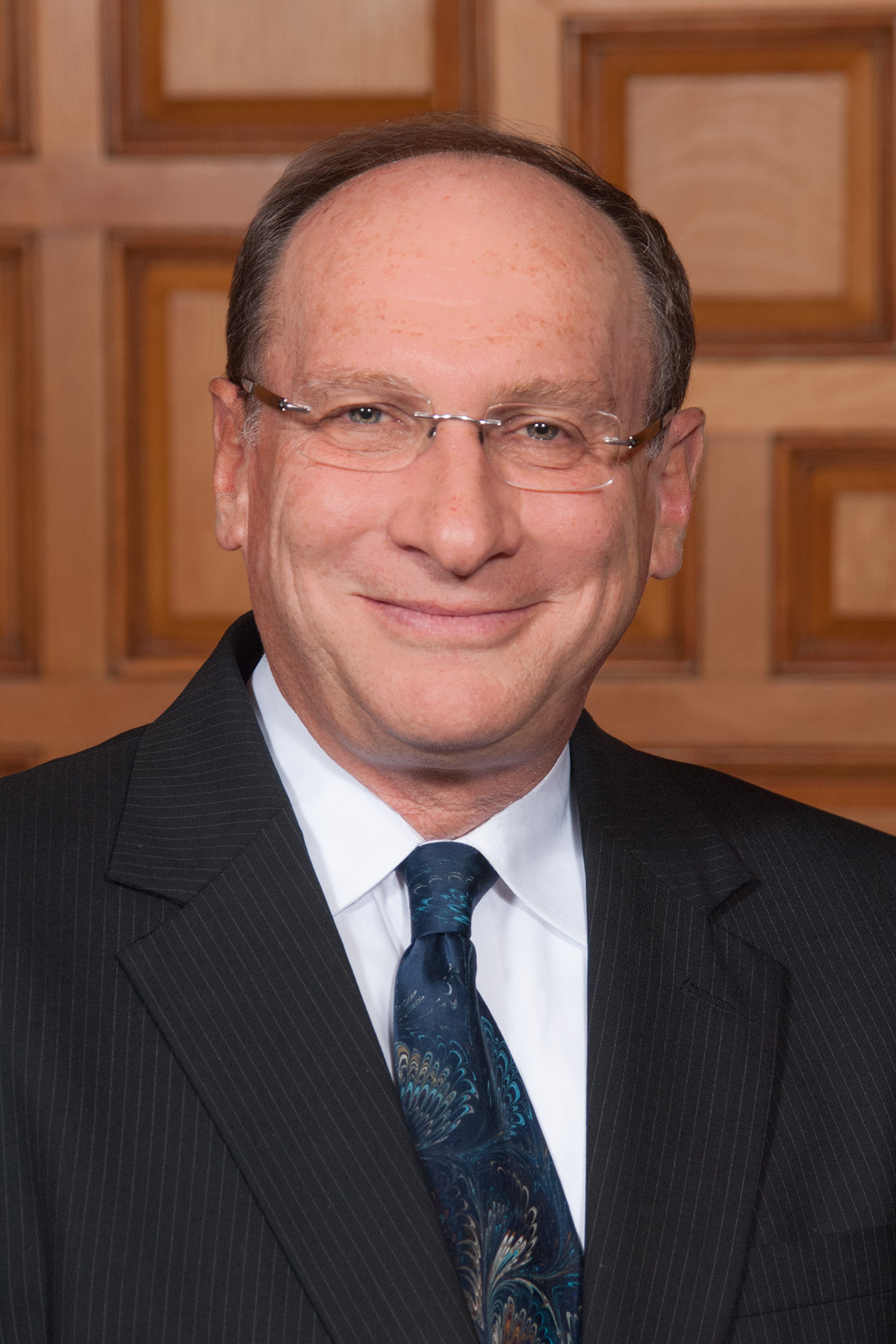
- Official portrait, 2014

Chief Justice of the Massachusetts Supreme Judicial Court
- In office July 28, 2014 – September 14, 2020
- Appointed by: Deval Patrick
- Preceded by: Roderick L. Ireland
- Succeeded by: Kimberly S. Budd

Associate Justice of the Massachusetts Supreme Judicial Court
- In office January 29, 2009 – July 28, 2014
- Appointed by: Deval Patrick
- Preceded by: John Greaney
- Succeeded by: Geraldine Hines

Associate Justice of the Massachusetts Superior Court
- In office 1997 – January 29, 2009
- Appointed by: Bill Weld
- Succeeded by: Kimberly S. Budd

Personal details
- Born: September 29, 1954 New Rochelle, New York, U.S.
- Died: September 14, 2020 (aged 65) New Rochelle, New York, U.S.
- Party: Democratic
- Education: Harvard University (BA, JD); University of Cambridge

Ralph D. Gants (September 29, 1954 – September 14, 2020) was an American attorney and jurist who served as the chief justice of the Massachusetts Supreme Judicial Court. He was sworn in on July 28, 2014. Gants had previously served as an Assistant United States Attorney.

== Early life and career ==
Gants was born in New Rochelle, New York, in 1954. He received his Bachelor of Arts, summa cum laude, from Harvard College in 1976, graduating Phi Beta Kappa. The following year he completed a Diploma in Criminology at Cambridge University in England. In 1980, he earned a Juris Doctor, magna cum laude, from Harvard Law School where he was notes editor of the Harvard Law Review.

== Career ==
After graduation from law school, he served as law clerk to United States District Court Judge Eugene H. Nickerson. From 1981 to 1983, he was Special Assistant to Judge William H. Webster, Director of the Federal Bureau of Investigation. In 1983, he was appointed Assistant United States Attorney for the District of Massachusetts, serving as Chief of Public Corruption Division from 1988 to 1991. In 1991, he joined the Boston law firm of Palmer & Dodge LLP, becoming a partner in 1994. He taught at Harvard Law School, New England School of Law, and Northeastern University School of Law.

Gants was a proponent of criminal justice reform throughout his career, and he worked with the Massachusetts General Court in passing a criminal justice reform bill in 2018. He was also an outspoken opponent of mandatory minimum sentences, having told the Judiciary Committee in 2015, "If you do not abolish minimum mandatory sentences for drug offenses, you must accept the tragic fact that this disparate treatment of persons of color will be allowed to continue."

=== Judicial service ===
He was appointed as an associate justice of the Massachusetts Superior Court in 1997 by Governor Bill Weld. In 2008, he served as Administrative Justice of the Superior Court's Business Litigation Session. Governor Deval Patrick appointed him to the Supreme Judicial Court in December 2008 and he took office in January 2009 after being confirmed by the Governor's Council. Upon learning of his nomination, Council member Mary-Ellen Manning remarked, "Ralph Gants is a mensch, and the bench needs a mensch." On April 17, 2014, he was nominated by Governor Patrick to replace Roderick L. Ireland as Chief Justice after his retirement; he was confirmed by the Governor's Council and was sworn in on July 28, 2014.

In April 2020, Grants wrote a concurrence arguing against a bright line rule defining where use of automatic number-plate recognition cameras becomes an unconstitutional search when the unanimous court upheld their warrantless use on bridges to Cape Cod.

== Personal life and death ==
Justice Gants was married with two children. Gants died on September 14, 2020, at the age of 65. He had previously suffered a heart attack. The Supreme Judicial Court of Massachusetts closed the courts on Friday, September 18, 2020, as a day of remembrance for Chief Justice Gants.

Legal offices
Preceded by John Greaney	Associate Justice of the Massachusetts Supreme Judicial Court; 2009–2014	Succeeded by Geraldine Hines
Preceded by Roderick L. Ireland	Chief Justice of the Massachusetts Supreme Judicial Court; 2014–2020	Succeeded by Barbara Lenk (Acting); Kimberly S. Budd
