= West Bolivar Consolidated School District =

School district in Mississippi

Address
- 909 Highway 8 Rosedale, Mississippi, 38769; United States

District information
- Type: Public
- Grades: K–12
- NCES District ID: 2800185

Students and staff
- Students: 1,015
- Teachers: 82.17
- Staff: 91.39
- Student–teacher ratio: 12.35

Other information
- Website: www.wbcsdk12.org

The West Bolivar Consolidated School District is a public school district based in Rosedale, Mississippi (USA).

It serves sections of Bolivar County. In addition to Rosedale, the district also serves the towns of Gunnison, Beulah, and Pace in western Bolivar County and Benoit and the section of Shaw in southern Bolivar County. It also serves unincorporated areas of Scott, Skene, and Symonds.

== History ==
In 1925, 9-year-old Martha Lum was denied admission to Rosedale Consolidated High School (now West Bolivar High School) because she was Chinese American. The U.S. Supreme Court upheld the Mississippi's right to exclude her in Lum v. Rice. That decision was overturned by the holding in Brown v. Board of Education in 1954.

Beginning in 1986 Benoit School District students did not attend Ray Brooks School (previously Nugent Center School, a.k.a. Benoit High School), but instead West Bolivar High School. However high school classes at Ray Brooks resumed in 2000. Linda Coleman, a Democratic member of the Mississippi House of Representatives from Mound Bayou, stated that the costs of transporting children to West Bolivar from Benoit were too high.

In 2012 the Mississippi Legislature passed a bill that required five school districts in Bolivar County to consolidate into two larger ones. On July 1, 2014, the Benoit School District, Shaw School District, and West Bolivar School District consolidated into the West Bolivar Consolidated School District. The former three districts were abolished under the law with a new one formed.

In 2017 there were at least 19 people applying to be the district's superintendent.

== Governance ==
The board has two members from the Rosedale area, two members from the Shaw area, and one from the Benoit area.

== Schools ==
7-12 schools

- Shaw High School (Shaw)
- West Bolivar High School (Rosedale)

PK-6

- McEvans Elementary School (Shaw)
- West Bolivar Elementary School (Rosedale)

Other

- Joe Barnes Career Technical Center (Rosedale)

Former schools

- PK-12: Ray Brooks School (near Benoit) (closed 2020)
- West Bolivar Middle School (Rosedale)
  - In 2020 the district decided to move West Bolivar High into the West Bolivar Middle building. at 1213 South Main Street. West Bolivar High moved to Building B. Now West Bolivar High is a unified 7-12 school, at the former middle school campus.

== Demographics ==
=== 2006-07 school year ===
There were a total of 1,014 students enrolled in the West Bolivar School District during the 2006–2007 school year. The gender makeup of the district was 48% female and 52% male. The racial makeup of the district was 95.86% African American, 3.35% White, and 0.79% Hispanic. 88.5% of the district's students were eligible to receive free lunch.

=== Previous school years ===
School Year	Enrollment	Gender Makeup		Racial Makeup				
School Year	Enrollment	Female	Male	Asian	African American	Hispanic	Native American	White
2005-06	1,056	50%	50%	–	95.93%	0.76%	–	3.31%
2004-05	1,094	48%	52%	0.09%	96.80%	0.64%	–	2.47%
2003-04	1,159	48%	52%	0.09%	97.58%	0.26%	–	2.07%
2002-03	1,162	49%	51%	0.17%	97.16%	0.26%	–	2.41%

== Accountability statistics ==
	2006-07	2005-06	2004-05	2003-04	2002-03
District Accreditation Status	Accredited	Accredited	Accredited	Accredited	Accredited
School Performance Classifications
Level 5 (Superior Performing) Schools	1	0	0	0	0
Level 4 (Exemplary) Schools	1	0	0	1	0
Level 3 (Successful) Schools	1	2	2	1	1
Level 2 (Under Performing) Schools	0	1	1	1	1
Level 1 (Low Performing) Schools	1	0	0	0	1
Not Assigned	0	0	0	0	0

== See also ==
- List of school districts in Mississippi
