= Johnny Parker (strength and conditioning coach) =

Strength and conditioning coach

Johnny Parker was a strength and conditioning coach in the NFL from 1984 to 2007. He is in the USA Strength and Conditioning Coaches Hall of Fame.

== History ==
Parker was born on February 1, 1947, in Shaw, Mississippi. He began lifting weights as a 100 pound high school freshman. Parker played high school football and threw the discus for Shaw High School until his graduation in 1964. He majored in history at Ole Miss (where he did not play any sports), then taught and coached linebackers at Indianola Academy.

Parker served as strength and conditioning coach at the University of South Carolina, Indiana University, LSU, and Ole Miss.

In 1984 he joined the New York Giants, winning Super Bowls in 1986 and 1990. He coached in a third Super Bowl with the New England Patriots in 1997, and a fourth with the Tampa Bay Buccaneers in 2003. He finished his NFL career with the San Francisco 49ers from 2005 to 2008.

In 1994 the Professional Football Strength and Conditioning Coaches Society named him the NFL's top strength and conditioning coach.

In 1988 Parker, along with Al Miller, worked with Soviet defector Grigori Goldstein to incorporate Soviet-style periodization into their methods. They utilized this info in their work, and after their retirement from coaching eventually coauthored The System: Soviet Periodization Adapted For the American Strength Coach in 2018, along with Rob Panariello.
