= Massachusetts Superior Court =

Trial court department in Massachusetts

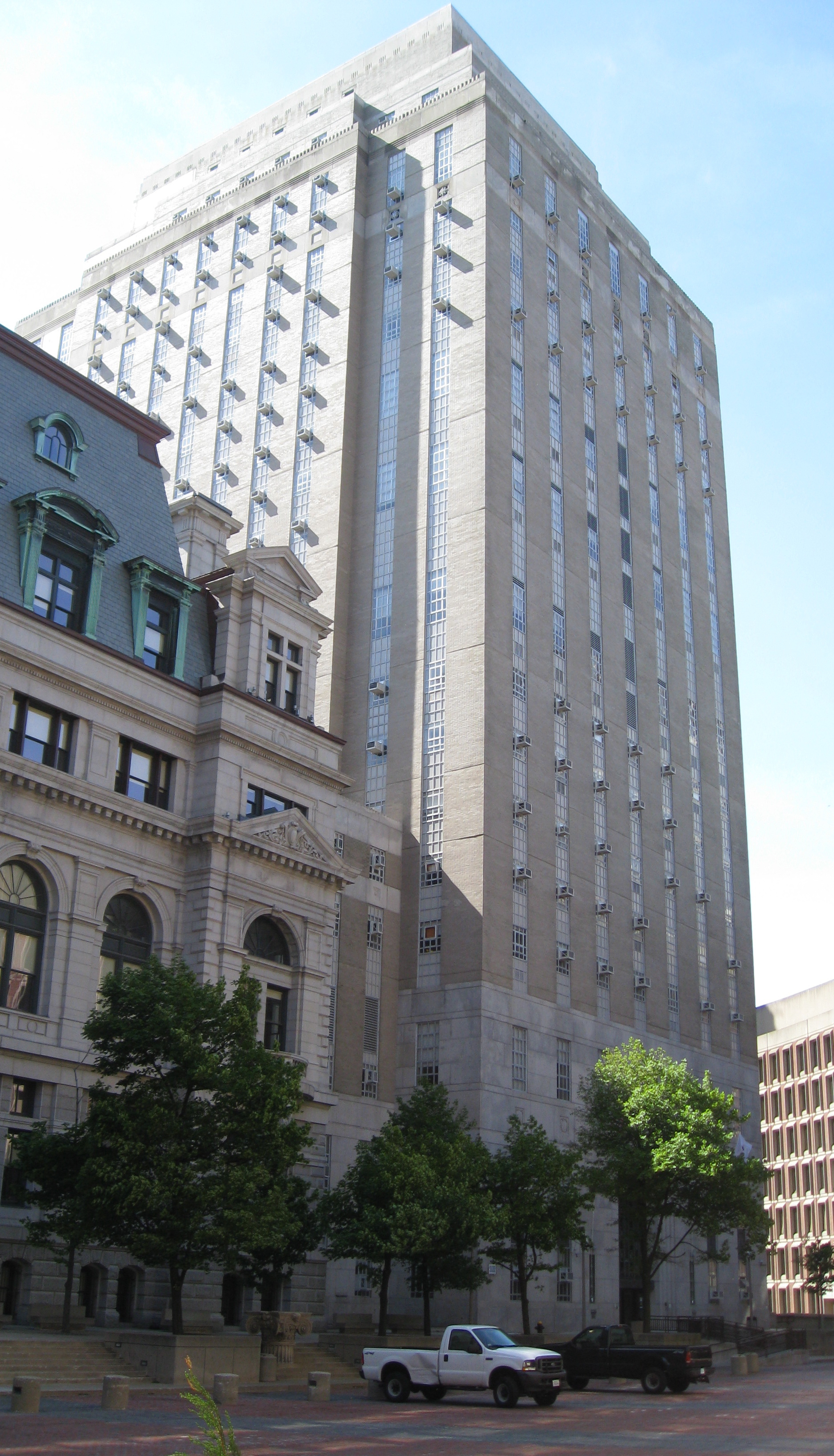
The Suffolk County Courthouse in Boston is home to the Superior Court Administrative Office

The Massachusetts Superior Court (also known as the Superior Court Department of the Trial Court) is a trial court department in Massachusetts.

The Superior Court has original jurisdiction in civil actions over $50,000, and in matters where equitable relief is sought. It also has original jurisdiction in actions involving labor disputes where injunctive relief is sought, and has exclusive authority to convene medical malpractice tribunals.

The Business Litigation Sessions (BLS) of the Superior Court is a specialized business court docket located in Suffolk County (Boston). The BLS has jurisdiction over complex business and commercial disputes. The original Business Litigation Session solely heard cases arising in Suffolk County, beginning in 2000, but over time the BLS became a regional program and finally a statewide business court. The BLS was authorized and implemented by order of Superior Court Chief Justice Suzanne DelVecchio in 1999, beginning operations in 2000, with the Honorable Allan van Gestel as its first judge, who was integral to the BLS's establishment and viability. Justice DelVecchio appointed a Business Litigation Resource Committee to provide input and feedback on the new program in its early years. The late Massachusetts Supreme Judicial Court Chief Justice Ralph Gants had been a BLS judge earlier in his career, as had retired Supreme Judicial Court Associate Justice Margot Botsford.

The Court has exclusive original jurisdiction in first degree murder cases and original jurisdiction for all other crimes. It has jurisdiction over all felony matters, although it shares jurisdiction over crimes where other Trial Court Departments have concurrent jurisdiction. Finally, the Superior Court has appellate jurisdiction over certain administrative proceedings.
