= Shaw, Mississippi =

- City
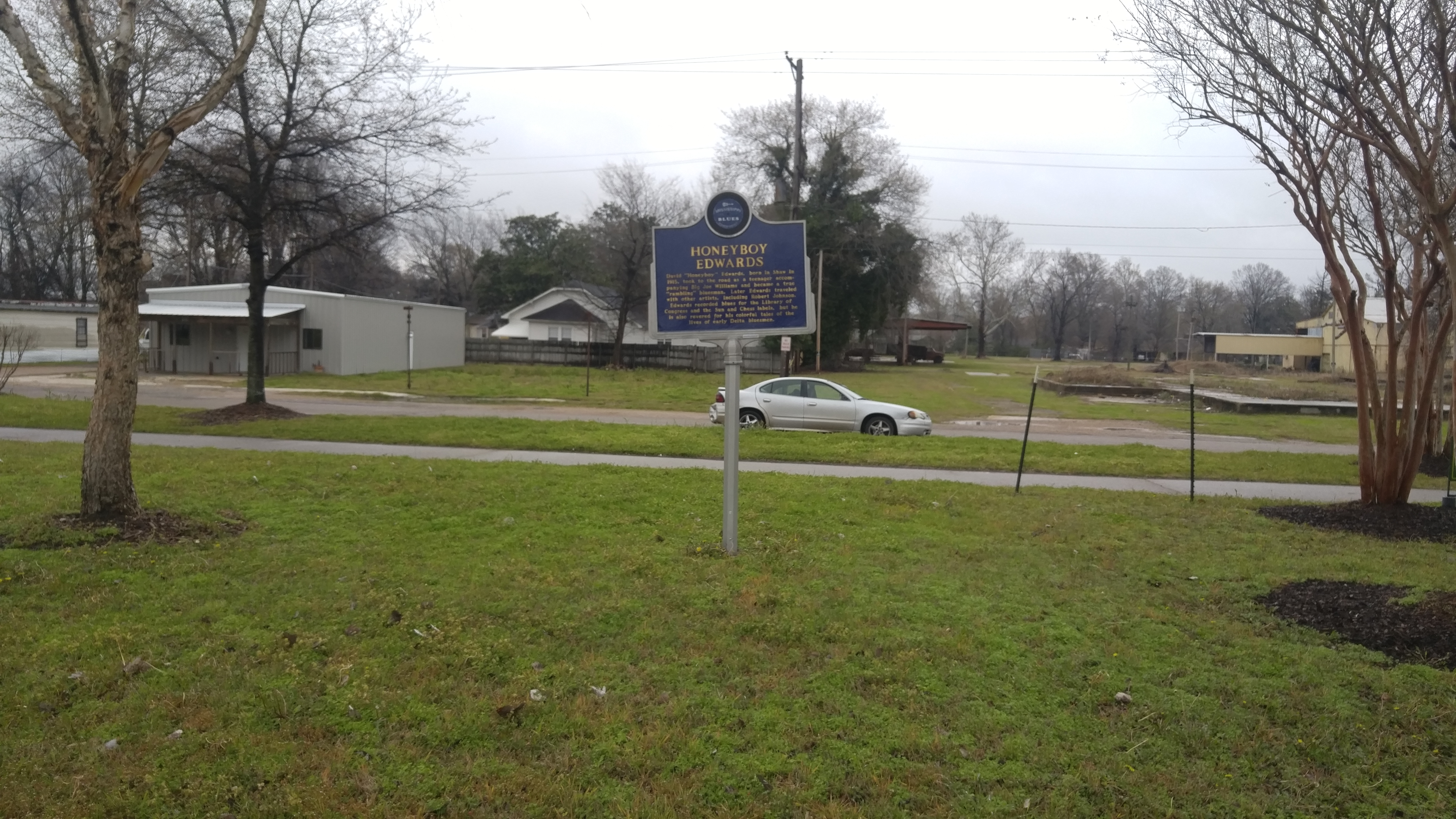
- Mississippi Blues Trail marker for David "Honeyboy" Edwards in Shaw

- Location of Shaw, Mississippi

- Location in the United States
- Coordinates: 33°36′05″N 90°46′19″W
- Country: United States
- State: Mississippi
- Counties: Bolivar, Sunflower

Area
  - Total: 1.11 sq mi (2.88 km^{2})
  - Land: 1.11 sq mi (2.88 km^{2})
  - Water: 0 sq mi (0.00 km^{2})
- Elevation: 135 ft (41 m)

Population (2020)
  - Total: 1,457
  - Density: 1,309.1/sq mi (505.46/km^{2})
- Time zone: UTC-6 (Central (CST))
  - Summer (DST): UTC-5 (CDT)
- ZIP code: 38773
- Area code: 662
- FIPS code: 28-67000
- GNIS feature ID: 2405451

Shaw is a city in Bolivar and Sunflower counties, Mississippi, United States, located in the Mississippi Delta region. The name was derived from an old Indian tribe northeast of this region. As of the 2020 census, Shaw had a population of 1,457.

== History ==
On June 30, 1914, Jack Farmer, an African-American resident of Shaw, was being sought by a white posse for allegedly murdering Earl Chase, a white man, also a resident of Shaw. Two deaths took place during the intense search: Jennie Collins, an African-American woman thought to have assisted Farmer in his flight, and James Jolly, a member of the posse who was mistaken for Farmer in the darkness. Both were shot and killed as the posse swept through a local swamp where Farmer was believed to be hiding. Farmer was never located.

Shaw gained national attention in 1971 when a group of local residents led by Andrew Hawkins sued the town for violating their Fourteenth Amendment right to equal protection under the law. In Hawkins v. Town of Shaw, the residents claimed the town had discriminated against black neighborhoods in the way it distributed public services, noting that while 99 percent of homes occupied by whites had access to sewers, only 80 percent of black-occupied homes had sewer access. Water pressure was also lower in black neighborhoods. The Fifth Circuit Court ruled in favor of the plaintiffs, and ordered Shaw to equalize access to public services such as fire hydrants, water mains, lighting, sewers and street paving. The ruling was considered a watershed civil rights victory, with some commentators comparing it to Brown v. Board of Education. However, the case did not encourage a wave of similar lawsuits in other jurisdictions.

== Geography ==
Shaw is almost entirely in Bolivar County, with a small portion extending east into adjacent Sunflower County. In the 2000 census, all of the city's 2,313 residents lived in Bolivar County. Although no residents lived in the Sunflower County portion in 2000, that figure had risen to 1 by 2006.

According to the United States Census Bureau, the city has a total area of 1.1 square miles (2.9 km^{2}), all land.

== Demographics ==
Historical population
Census	Pop.	Note	%±
1890	201		—
1900	422		110.0%
1910	871		106.4%
1920	1,375		57.9%
1930	1,612		17.2%
1940	1,669		3.5%
1950	1,892		13.4%
1960	2,062		9.0%
1970	2,513		21.9%
1980	2,461		−2.1%
1990	2,349		−4.6%
2000	2,312		−1.6%
2010	1,952		−15.6%
2020	1,457		−25.4%
U.S. Decennial Census

=== Racial and ethnic composition ===
Shaw city, Mississippi – Racial and ethnic composition Note: the US Census treats Hispanic/Latino as an ethnic category. This table excludes Latinos from the racial categories and assigns them to a separate category. Hispanics/Latinos may be of any race.
Race / Ethnicity (NH = Non-Hispanic)	Pop 2000	Pop 2010	Pop 2020	% 2000	% 2010	% 2020
White alone (NH)	164	125	51	7.09%	6.40%	3.50%
Black or African American alone (NH)	2,117	1,816	1,376	91.57%	93.03%	94.44%
Native American or Alaska Native alone (NH)	1	0	0	0.04%	0.00%	0.00%
Asian alone (NH)	2	1	8	0.09%	0.05%	0.55%
Native Hawaiian or Pacific Islander alone (NH)	0	0	0	0.00%	0.00%	0.00%
Other race alone (NH)	0	0	0	0.00%	0.00%	0.00%
Mixed race or Multiracial (NH)	5	5	12	0.22%	0.26%	0.82%
Hispanic or Latino (any race)	23	5	10	0.99%	0.26%	0.69%
Total	2,312	1,952	1,457	100.00%	100.00%	100.00%

=== 2020 census ===
As of the 2020 United States Census, there were 1,457 people, 737 households, and 548 families residing in the city.

=== 2000 census ===
As of the census of 2000, there were 2,312 people, 753 households, and 573 families residing in the city. The population density was 2,082.8 inhabitants per square mile (804.2/km^{2}). There were 785 housing units at an average density of 707.2 per square mile (273.1/km^{2}). The racial makeup of the city was 7.31% White, 92.08% African American, 0.04% Native American, 0.09% Asian, 0.04% Pacific Islander, 0.22% from other races, and 0.22% from two or more races. Hispanic or Latino of any race were 0.99% of the population.

There were 753 households, out of which 37.6% had children under the age of 18 living with them, 33.5% were married couples living together, 37.8% had a female householder with no husband present, and 23.9% were non-families. 21.4% of all households were made up of individuals, and 8.6% had someone living alone who was 65 years of age or older. The average household size was 3.07 and the average family size was 3.58.

In the city, the population was spread out, with 33.9% under the age of 18, 11.7% from 18 to 24, 25.6% from 25 to 44, 18.9% from 45 to 64, and 9.9% who were 65 years of age or older. The median age was 29 years. For every 100 females, there were 82.9 males. For every 100 females age 18 and over, there were 74.6 males.

The median income for a household in the city was $18,878, and the median income for a family was $19,393. Males had a median income of $21,181 versus $18,816 for females. The per capita income for the city was $9,070. About 41.3% of families and 41.6% of the population were below the poverty line, including 53.5% of those under age 18 and 31.3% of those age 65 or over.

== Education ==
Most of Shaw is served by the West Bolivar Consolidated School District, while the small portion of the city that lies in Sunflower County is served by the Sunflower County School District. McEvans Elementary School and Shaw High School (at one time together as McEvans Warriors K-12 School) are the schools in town; Shaw High School and McEvans Elementary School merged effective 2020. As of 2024 they are separate institutions again.

The Bolivar County part of Shaw was in the Shaw School District until July 1, 2014, when that district was consolidated into West Bolivar Consolidated.

== Notable people ==
- Katie G. Dorsett, Democratic member of the North Carolina General Assembly
- David Honeyboy Edwards, blues singer and guitarist
- Boo Ferriss, former professional baseball pitcher for the Boston Red Sox
- Paul Gallo, radio show host
- Ethel Wright Mohamed, folk artist
- Ollie Mohamed, member of the Mississippi Senate from 1964 to 1993
- Johnny Parker, former NFL strength and conditioning coach
- Robert L. Sanders, member of the Mississippi House of Representatives
- Louis Satterfield, musician
- Bill Triplett, football player
