= Benoit, Mississippi =

- Town
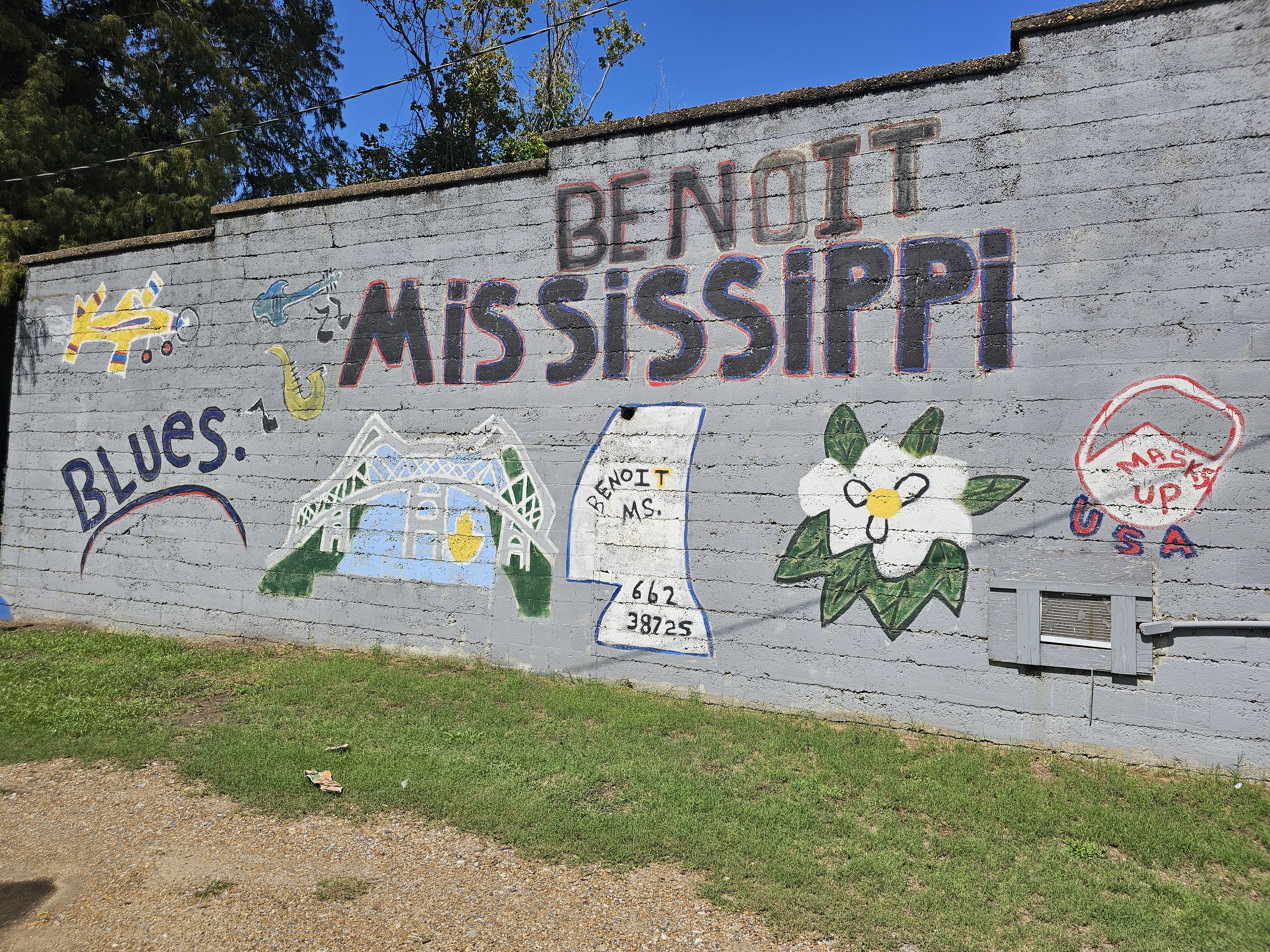
- Mural off of Mississippi Highway 1 in Beloit

- Location of Benoit, Mississippi

- Location in the United States
- Coordinates: 33°39′06″N 91°0′31″W
- Country: United States
- State: Mississippi
- County: Bolivar

Area
  - Total: 0.99 sq mi (2.56 km^{2})
  - Land: 0.97 sq mi (2.52 km^{2})
  - Water: 0.012 sq mi (0.03 km^{2})
- Elevation: 141 ft (43 m)

Population (2020)
  - Total: 365
  - Density: 374.6/sq mi (144.64/km^{2})
- Time zone: UTC-6 (Central (CST))
  - Summer (DST): UTC-5 (CDT)
- ZIP code: 38725
- Area code: 662
- FIPS code: 28-05220
- GNIS feature ID: 2405241

Benoit /bɪˈnɔɪt/ is a town in Bolivar County, Mississippi, United States. Per the 2020 Census, the population was 365.

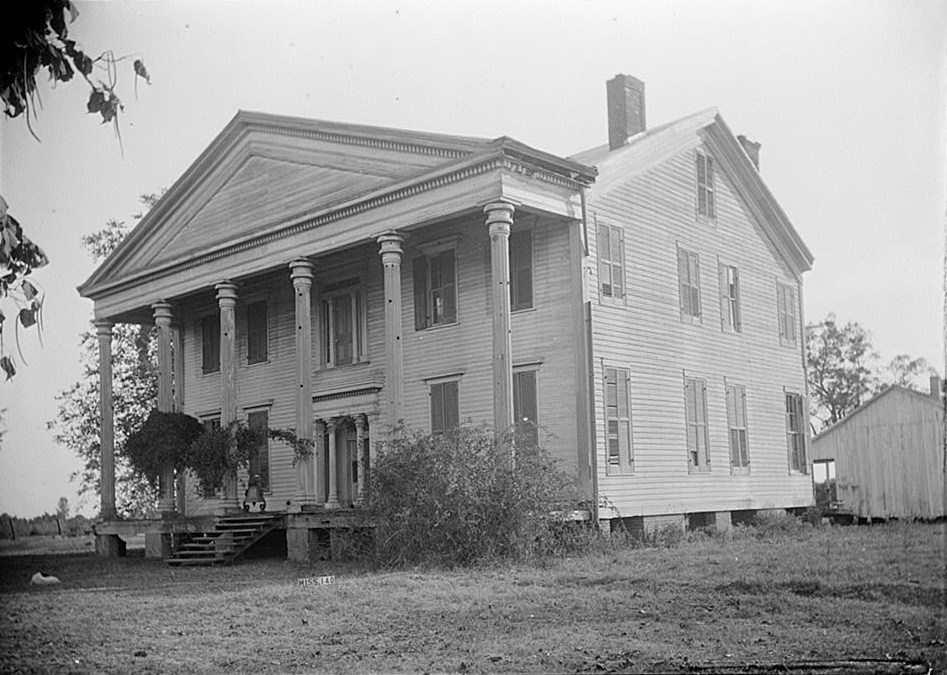
Hollywood (the Burrus House) in Benoit is listed on the National Register of Historic Places.

== History ==
The 1956 movie Baby Doll was shot on location at the Burrus House in Benoit; many local residents played in minor roles.

== Geography ==
According to the United States Census Bureau, the town has a total area of 1.0 square mile (2.6 km^{2}), of which 0.012 square miles (0.03 km^{2}), or 1.23%, is water.

== Demographics ==
Historical population
Census	Pop.	Note	%±
1910	412		—
1920	443		7.5%
1930	438		−1.1%
1940	406		−7.3%
1950	444		9.4%
1960	453		2.0%
1970	473		4.4%
1980	499		5.5%
1990	641		28.5%
2000	611		−4.7%
2010	477		−21.9%
2020	365		−23.5%
U.S. Decennial Census; 2010 2020

=== Racial and ethnic composition ===
Benoit town, Mississippi – Racial and ethnic composition Note: the US Census treats Hispanic/Latino as an ethnic category. This table excludes Latinos from the racial categories and assigns them to a separate category. Hispanics/Latinos may be of any race.
Race / Ethnicity (NH = Non-Hispanic)	Pop 2000	Pop 2010	Pop 2020	% 2000	% 2010	% 2020
White alone (NH)	129	85	82	21.11%	17.82%	22.47%
Black or African American alone (NH)	465	388	282	76.10%	81.34%	77.26%
Native American or Alaska Native alone (NH)	0	0	0	0.00%	0.00%	0.00%
Asian alone (NH)	0	0	0	0.00%	0.00%	0.00%
Native Hawaiian or Pacific Islander alone (NH)	0	0	0	0.00%	0.00%	0.00%
Other race alone (NH)	0	0	0	0.00%	0.00%	0.00%
Mixed race or Multiracial (NH)	3	0	0	0.49%	0.00%	0.00%
Hispanic or Latino (any race)	14	4	1	2.29%	0.84%	0.27%
Total	611	477	365	100.00%	100.00%	100.00%

=== 2000 Census ===
As of the census of 2000, there were 611 people, 193 households, and 153 families residing in the town. The population density was 627.2 inhabitants per square mile (242.2/km^{2}). There were 211 housing units at an average density of 216.6 per square mile (83.6/km^{2}). The racial makeup of the town was 21.28% White, 76.27% African American, 0.98% from other races, and 1.47% from two or more races. Hispanic or Latino of any race were 2.29% of the population.

There were 193 households, out of which 38.3% had children under the age of 18 living with them, 30.6% were married couples living together, 42.5% had a female householder with no husband present, and 20.7% were non-families. 19.7% of all households were made up of individuals, and 10.4% had someone living alone who was 65 years of age or older. The average household size was 3.17 and the average family size was 3.57.

In the town, the population was spread out, with 37.0% under the age of 18, 10.8% from 18 to 24, 24.2% from 25 to 44, 17.5% from 45 to 64, and 10.5% who were 65 years of age or older. The median age was 26 years. For every 100 females, there were 85.7 males. For every 100 females age 18 and over, there were 68.9 males.

The median income for a household in the town was $18,750, and the median income for a family was $18,929. Males had a median income of $30,357 versus $20,750 for females. The per capita income for the town was $7,813. About 43.1% of families and 49.3% of the population were below the poverty line, including 64.0% of those under age 18 and 18.2% of those age 65 or over.

== Education ==
Benoit is served by the West Bolivar Consolidated School District.

Formerly the area had its own school, Ray Brooks School (formerly Nugent Center School), a K-12 school. It was at first a part of the Benoit School District, until July 1, 2014, when that district was consolidated into West Bolivar Consolidated. In 1986 students were moved to West Bolivar High School for high school classes, but they were moved back to Ray Brooks in 2000. Ray Brooks closed in 2020. Tamara Lopez of Delta News TV stated "Residents in Benoit had mixed reactions to the announcement, some angry others sad."

== Notable people ==
- Lavarus Lakeith Giles, professional American and Canadian football running back
- Archie Moore, light heavyweight world champion boxer (1952–1962)
- Robert Powell, composer, organist, and choir director
- Eddie Taylor, electric blues guitarist and singer
