= Pace, Mississippi =

- Town
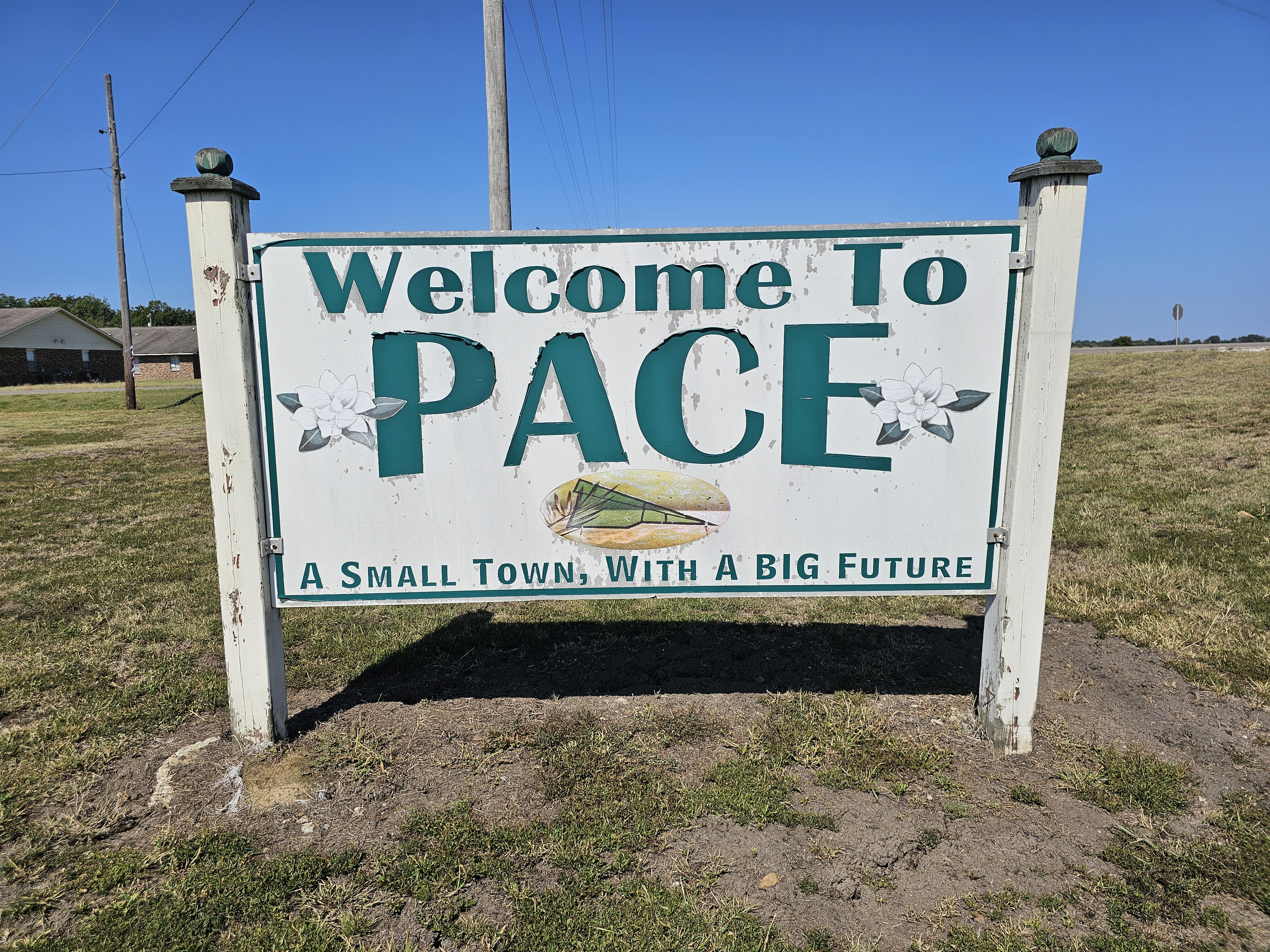
- Welcome sign in Pace

- Flag
- Motto: "A Small Town With A BIG Future
- Location of Pace, Mississippi

- Location in the United States
- Coordinates: 33°47′32″N 90°51′34″W
- Country: United States
- State: Mississippi
- County: Bolivar

Area
  - Total: 0.16 sq mi (0.41 km^{2})
  - Land: 0.15 sq mi (0.40 km^{2})
  - Water: 0.0077 sq mi (0.02 km^{2})
- Elevation: 141 ft (43 m)

Population (2020)
  - Total: 183
  - Density: 1,193.0/sq mi (460.63/km^{2})
- Time zone: UTC-6 (Central (CST))
  - Summer (DST): UTC-5 (CDT)
- ZIP code: 38764
- Area code: 662
- FIPS code: 28-54920
- GNIS feature ID: 2407062

Pace is a town in Bolivar County, Mississippi, United States. Per the 2020 census, the population was 183.

The community is named after James Henry Pace, a planter and land owner in the region.

== Geography ==
Mississippi Highway 8 passes along the town's northern boundary.

According to the United States Census Bureau, the town has a total area of 0.16 square miles (0.41 km^{2}), of which 0.0077 square miles (0.02 km^{2}), or 3.73%, is water.

== Demographics ==
Historical population
Census	Pop.	Note	%±
1930	349		—
1940	426		22.1%
1950	422		−0.9%
1960	420		−0.5%
1970	629		49.8%
1980	519		−17.5%
1990	354		−31.8%
2000	364		2.8%
2010	274		−24.7%
2020	183		−33.2%
U.S. Decennial Census; 2010 2020

=== Racial and ethnic composition ===
Pace town, Mississippi – Racial and ethnic composition Note: the US Census treats Hispanic/Latino as an ethnic category. This table excludes Latinos from the racial categories and assigns them to a separate category. Hispanics/Latinos may be of any race.
Race / Ethnicity (NH = Non-Hispanic)	Pop 2000	Pop 2010	Pop 2020	% 2000	% 2010	% 2020
White alone (NH)	49	45	19	13.46%	16.42%	10.38%
Black or African American alone (NH)	299	225	155	82.14%	82.12%	84.70%
Native American or Alaska Native alone (NH)	4	1	0	1.10%	0.36%	0.00%
Asian alone (NH)	6	0	1	1.65%	0.00%	0.55%
Native Hawaiian or Pacific Islander alone (NH)	0	0	0	0.00%	0.00%	0.00%
Other race alone (NH)	0	0	0	0.00%	0.00%	0.00%
Mixed race or Multiracial (NH)	1	2	6	0.27%	0.73%	3.28%
Hispanic or Latino (any race)	5	1	2	1.37%	0.36%	1.09%
Total	364	274	183	100.00%	100.00%	100.00%

=== 2000 Census ===
As of the census of 2000, there were 364 people, 129 households, and 95 families residing in the town. The population density was 2,365.3 inhabitants per square mile (913.2/km^{2}). There were 131 housing units at an average density of 851.2 units per square mile (328.7 units/km^{2}). The racial makeup of the town was 13.74% White, 82.69% African American, 1.10% Native American, 1.65% Asian, and 0.82% from two or more races. Hispanic or Latino of any race were 1.37% of the population.

There were 129 households, out of which 35.7% had children under the age of 18 living with them, 41.1% were married couples living together, 30.2% had a female householder with no husband present, and 25.6% were non-families. 22.5% of all households were made up of individuals, and 5.4% had someone living alone who was 65 years of age or older. The average household size was 2.82 and the average family size was 3.33.

In the town, the population was spread out, with 30.2% under the age of 18, 7.7% from 18 to 24, 27.7% from 25 to 44, 22.3% from 45 to 64, and 12.1% who were 65 years of age or older. The median age was 34 years. For every 100 females, there were 82.0 males. For every 100 females age 18 and over, there were 75.2 males.

The median income for a household in the town was $24,219, and the median income for a family was $27,857. Males had a median income of $21,042 versus $17,083 for females. The per capita income for the town was $12,434. About 24.5% of families and 26.0% of the population were below the poverty line, including 36.6% of those under age 18 and 13.2% of those age 65 or over.

== Education ==
Pace is served by the West Bolivar Consolidated School District (formerly the West Bolivar School District), which operates West Bolivar High School.

== Notable person ==
- Besmilr Brigham, poet and short story writer
