= Miami Gardens Police Department =

Law enforcement agency for Miami Gardens, Florida

- Abbreviation: MGPD

Agency overview
- Formed: 2007

Jurisdictional structure
- Operations jurisdiction: Miami Gardens, Florida, USA
- Area: 21.8 square miles (56 km^{2})
- Population: 107,167 (2010)
- General nature: Local civilian police

Operational structure
- Headquarters: Miami Gardens, Florida
- Police Officers: ~232
- Civilians: 121
- Agency executive: Delma Noel-Pratt, [Chief of Police]

Website
- Miami Gardens Police

The Miami Gardens Police Department or MGPD, often referred to as the City of Miami Gardens Police, is the chief police department of the U.S. city of Miami Gardens, Florida. Its headquarters located at 18601 NW 27th Ave, Miami Gardens, Florida.

There is one patrolling district and seven neighborhoods for which the following districts are responsible:

- Andover
- Bunche Park
- Carol City
- Lake Lucerne
- Norland, Florida
- Opa-Locka North
- Scott Lake

The department also patrols Hard Rock Stadium, and the Calder Casino & Race Track.

In 2013, serious allegations of civil rights abuses and sweeping misconduct were made against the department. The podcast “This American Life” covered these allegations in-depth in their episode “Cops See it Different: Part 2”

== Chiefs of Police ==
- Matthew Boyd 2007-December 2013
  - Paul Miller (acting) December 2013-May 2014
- Stephen Johnson May 2014-February 2015
  - Antonio Brooklen (acting) February 2015-November 2015
- Antonio Brooklen November 2015-October 1, 2016
  - Cynthia Machanic (acting) October 1, 2016-May 1, 2017
- Delma Noel-Pratt May 1, 2017-present
