= SEED Foundation =

U.S. non-profit organization

The SEED Foundation
- Founded: 1997
- Founder: Eric Adler; Rajiv Vinnakota
- Type: IRS status: 501(c)(3)
- Location: Washington, D.C., United States
- Method: Public-Private Funding
- Key people: Lesley Poole, Dwight Crawford, Vincena Allen
- Website: www.seedfoundation.com

The SEED Foundation (also often referred to as the SEED Schools) is a 501(c)(3) organization, established in 1997 to provide boarding school college-preparatory educational opportunities to underserved students.

In 2002, the SEED School of DC received a $100,000 grant from Oprah Winfrey's Angel Network for the construction of new dormitory facilities. In 2010, the SEED schools were featured on 60 Minutes and the Washington, D.C. school is featured in the 2010 documentary film Waiting for "Superman".

== Schools ==
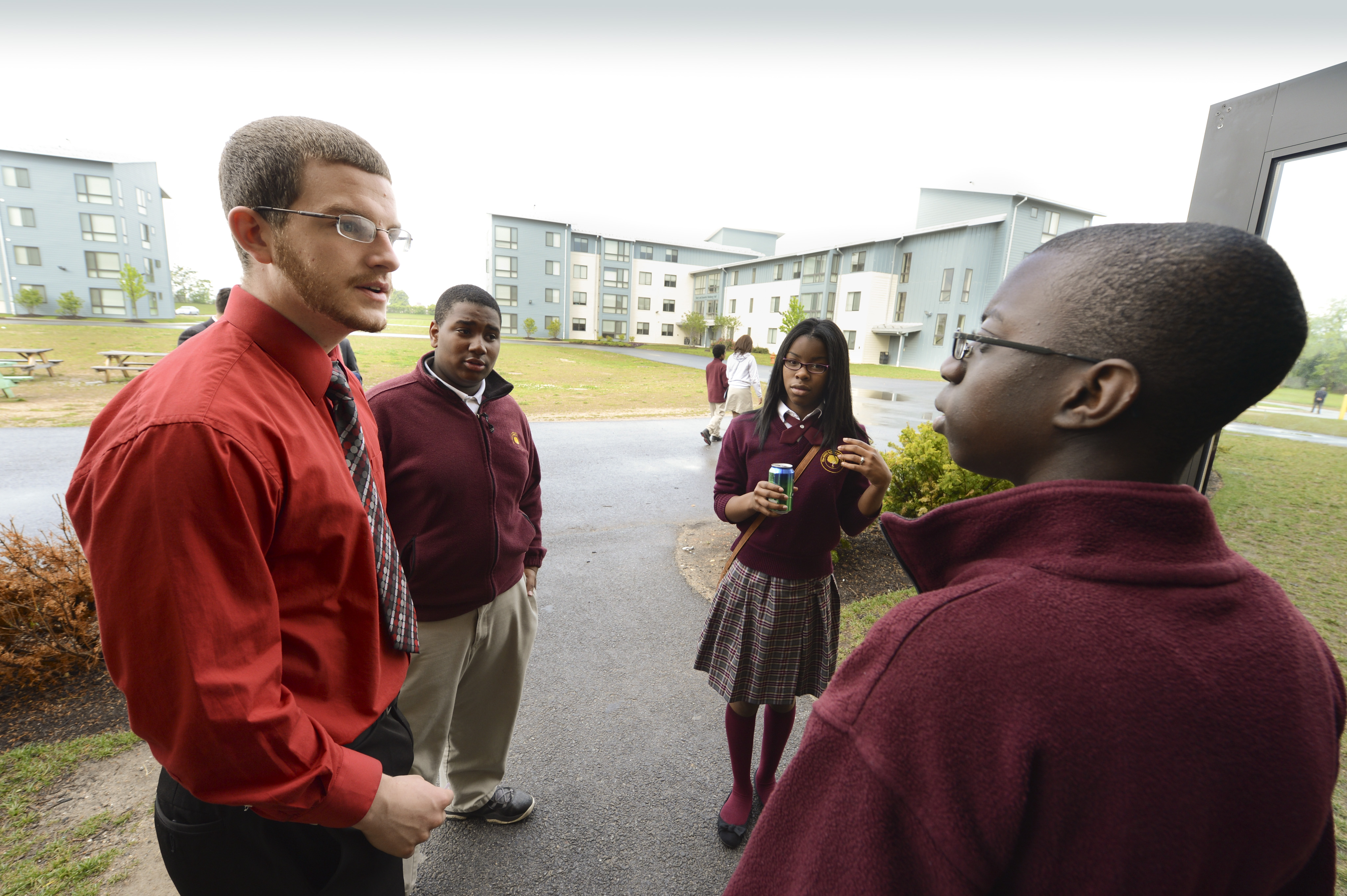
Students at a 2012 meeting on the SEED School's Baltimore campus.

The SEED schools are boarding schools serving disadvantaged students located in Washington, D.C., Maryland, and Miami. The schools integrate "a rigorous academic program with a nurturing boarding program, which teaches life skills and provides a safe and secure environment." The students live in campus dormitories during the week in order to provide students with a uniform residential experience.

=== Washington, D.C. ===
The SEED School in Washington, D.C., opened in 1998, has an enrollment of 320 students from sixth through twelfth grades. The school serves students from across Washington, D.C. The majority of SEED students live in the Southeast Washington, D.C. neighborhood.

The D.C. school has been called successful with "91 percent of ninth graders go on to graduate and 96 percent of graduating seniors are accepted to four-year colleges". The SEED school in Washington D.C. was visited by U.S. president Barack Obama in April 2009, where the president also hosted a bill signing ceremony to enact a national service act. The school was also visited by Charles, Prince of Wales and Camilla, Duchess of Cornwall.

=== Maryland ===
The SEED School of Maryland, opened in August 2008, draws students from across the state. The school currently has an enrollment of 400 students from sixth through twelfth grades. The school's first class of seniors graduated in May 2015. The school is located at 200 Font Hill, Baltimore, Maryland (39°17′2″N 76°39′50.4″W)

SEED Maryland includes boarding facilities. The State of Maryland classifies it as a public school.

=== Miami ===
The SEED School of Miami opened in August 2014 on the Florida Memorial University (FMU) campus in Miami Gardens; FMU is within the former Opa-locka North census-designated place. It serves 97 sixth- and seventh-graders from all over South Florida.

=== Other schools ===
SEED has announced plans to expand with additional schools in other U.S. cities.

Lad Lake met with SEED Foundation officials when they were planning their own charter school.
