= Sunrise, Florida =

City in Florida, United States

- City
- City of Sunrise
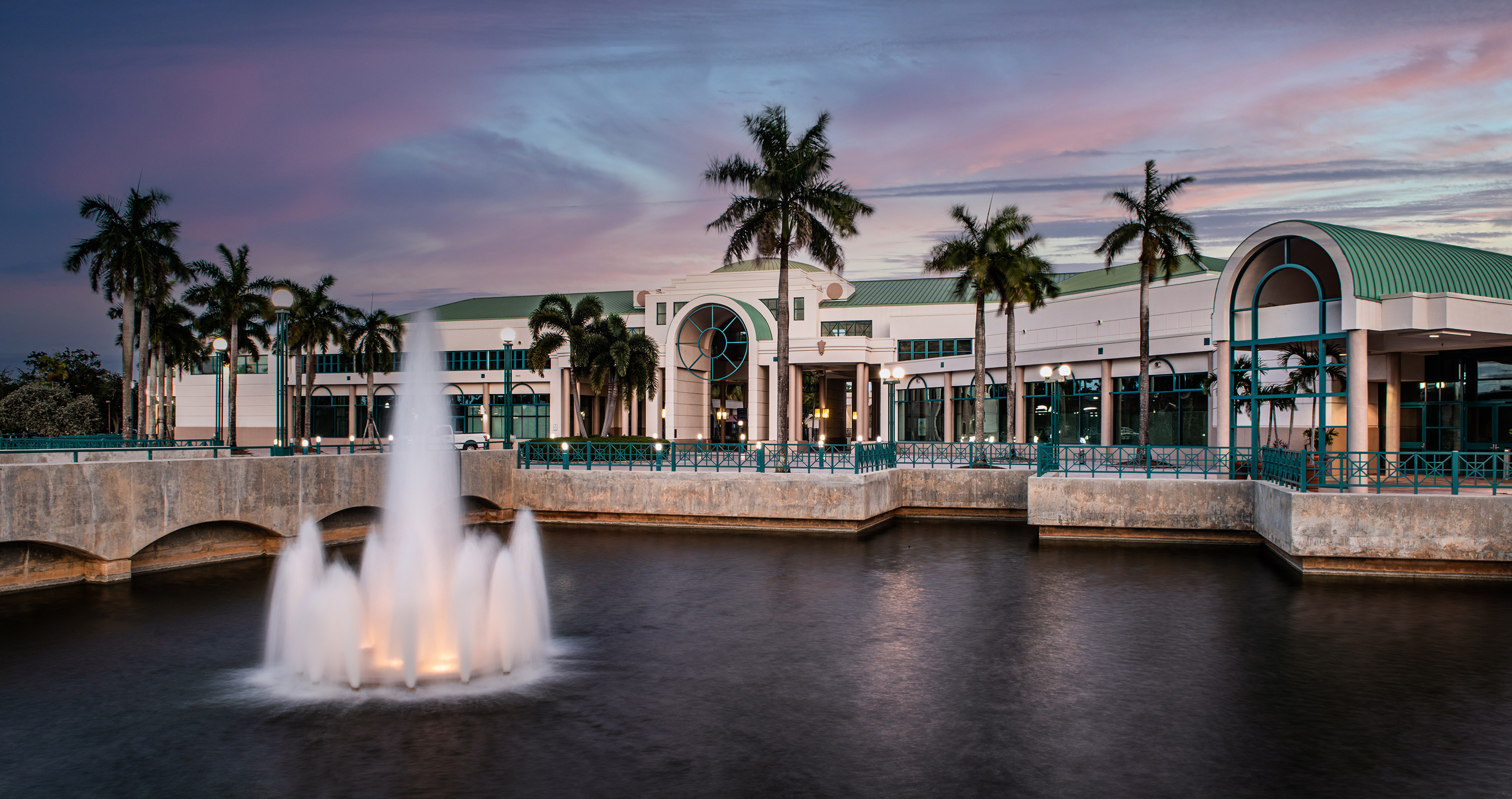
- Sunrise Civic Center

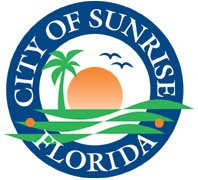
- Flag Seal
- Nicknames: The Center of South Florida
- Interactive map of Sunrise, Florida
- Location within Florida Location within the United States
- Coordinates: 26.171601°N 80.261633°W
- Country: United States
- State: Florida
- County: Broward
- Founded: 1961
- Incorporated: June 22, 1961 as of Sunrise Golf Village
- Incorporated: March 2, 1971 as of Sunrise
- Founder: Norman Johnson

Government
  - Type: Commission–Manager
  - Mayor: Michael J. Ryan

Area
  - Total: 18.123 sq mi (46.938 km^{2})
  - Land: 16.199 sq mi (41.954 km^{2})
  - Water: 1.924 sq mi (4.983 km^{2}) 10.62%
- Elevation: 6.6 ft (2 m)

Population (2020)
  - Total: 97,335
  - Estimate (2024): 100,128
  - Rank: US: 346th FL: 27th
  - Density: 6,008.9/sq mi (2,320.0/km^{2})
- Time zone: UTC–5 (Eastern (EST))
  - Summer (DST): UTC–4 (EDT)
- ZIP Codes: 33313, 33319, 33322–33323, 33325–33326, 33345, 33351
- Area codes: 954 and 754
- FIPS code: 12-69700
- GNIS feature ID: 2405550
- Website: sunrisefl.gov

Sunrise is a city in central-western Broward County, Florida, United States, and is a principal city located in the Miami metropolitan area. The population was 97,335 at the 2020 census, and was estimated at 100,128 in 2024.

== History ==
=== Early history ===
In 1960, Iowa-born developer Norman Johnson paid $9 million for 2,650 acres of land in southwestern Broward County. By 1961 it had fewer than 350 residents.

It has been reported that the community was going to be named Sunset Village, but this did not happen because residents felt that "sunset" was too final, so a change was made to "Sunrise." Mr. Johnson and F.E. Dykstra developed and built an "upside-down house" to lure property buyers. The home was completely furnished. Public interest was aroused through numerous news articles including a feature from Life magazine. It became a national attraction that drew thousands to the Village.

In 1961, Norman Johnson was appointed by Governor C. Farris Bryant as the first Mayor of Sunrise Golf Village.

According to "City of Sunrise Golf Village", a booklet produced by the city in 1969: "On January 10, 1967, (a date called for by City Charter) Sunrise Golf Village emerged from a developer's operation into a free city under complete control of its residents. Also, on this auspicious date, the City elected a Mayor and seven Councilmen to four-year terms of office. The City of Sunrise Golf Village which comprises 3 1/2 square miles, has no air pollution or drainage problems, all paved streets, and street lighting throughout the entire City."

That first elected mayor was John Lomelo Jr., a former Miami nightclub owner who was drawn to Sunrise Golf Village by the Upside-Down House.

=== Growth ===
Originally known as Sunrise Golf Village, the city had a population of 4,300 and comprised just 1.75 square miles by 1967. Then, during the 1970s, as Broward County began to push west, the city experienced its first real growth.

In 1971, the city, by referendum, changed its name to the City of Sunrise. Through annexation, Sunrise eventually expanded to its current boundaries—encompassing more than 18 square miles, reaching the Everglades and dropping south of I-595/State Road 84. The city is situated approximately six miles west of Fort Lauderdale, and is adjoined by the communities of Weston, Davie, Tamarac, Lauderhill, and Plantation.

By October 1984, the city had reached an estimated population of 50,000. In the mid-1980s, growth gave way to challenges, as the city was faced with financial difficulties, limited economic opportunities and a lack of adequate civic amenities. In the early 1990s, Sunrise worked to put its financial house in order, rebuild its infrastructure and establish itself as a center for business headquarters. It is the site of Sawgrass International Corporate Park, which is on a 612-acre lot, the largest corporate park in South Florida.

In 1990, the first phase of Sawgrass Mills opened in Sunrise. Due to its continued popularity and expansion, the shopping and entertainment center has grown to almost 2.3 million square feet. It features 350 outlet and value retailers; food courts and full-service restaurants; movie theater and family entertainment venues.

The National Car Rental Center, now the Amerant Bank Arena, opened in 1998. The arena is the home of the National Hockey League's Florida Panthers, and hosts top entertainers and events, and is the largest indoor arena in Florida.

Sunrise operates its own utility services, including water, wastewater, and natural gas, as well as municipal fire-rescue and police departments. The city also maintains its own system of parks, as well as a soccer club, golf course, tennis club, playgrounds and swimming pools. The Sunrise Civic Center includes a 300-seat theater, an art gallery, an athletic club, and banquet facilities. Sunrise is also home to eleven public schools.

=== Google Maps loss incident ===
In September 2010, Sunrise was "lost" by Google Maps. Individuals attempting to get driving directions or locate a business in Sunrise were redirected to Sarasota, Florida. This was the third time this occurred in Sunrise's history.

=== Recent history ===
On February 2, 2021, a shootout occurred between a gunman and several FBI agents at an apartment complex in Sunrise. At the time, the agents were serving a federal warrant related to a child exploitation case. Two FBI agents were fatally shot and three others were injured. The gunman, who was the subject of the warrant, was later found dead after barricading himself inside the apartment. The shootout was the most violent incident in the FBI's history since the 1986 shootout that left two agents dead and five others injured, and it was also the first time an agent was fatally shot in the line of duty since 2008.

On January 20, 2024, The new City Hall was built. Sunrise City Hall is a modern, five-story, 95,000-square-foot building consolidating most City departments and services. Additional enhancements to the Sunrise municipal complex will include the construction of a new 500-space parking garage, as well as an expanded amphitheater.

== Geography ==
According to the United States Census Bureau, the city has a total area of 18.123 square miles (46.94 km^{2}), of which 16.199 square miles (41.96 km^{2}) is land and 1.924 square miles (4.98 km^{2}) (10.62%) is water.

Sunrise is located approximately 30 miles northwest of Miami and 12 miles west of Fort Lauderdale. It is on the edge of the Miami urban development boundary.

=== Climate ===
Sunrise has a tropical monsoon climate (Am) with hot, humid summers and warm winters.

Climate data for Sunrise, Florida, 1991–2020 normals, extremes 1999–present
Month	Jan	Feb	Mar	Apr	May	Jun	Jul	Aug	Sep	Oct	Nov	Dec	Year
Record high °F (°C)	85 (29)	91 (33)	94 (34)	98 (37)	97 (36)	99 (37)	98 (37)	98 (37)	98 (37)	94 (34)	101 (38)	91 (33)	101 (38)
Mean maximum °F (°C)	85.4 (29.7)	87.2 (30.7)	89.9 (32.2)	92.1 (33.4)	93.4 (34.1)	95.7 (35.4)	95.1 (35.1)	95.6 (35.3)	94.2 (34.6)	91.8 (33.2)	87.8 (31.0)	86.0 (30.0)	97.0 (36.1)
Mean daily maximum °F (°C)	76.9 (24.9)	78.9 (26.1)	81.3 (27.4)	84.5 (29.2)	87.3 (30.7)	90.0 (32.2)	91.7 (33.2)	91.8 (33.2)	89.8 (32.1)	86.8 (30.4)	82.2 (27.9)	78.6 (25.9)	85.0 (29.4)
Daily mean °F (°C)	68.1 (20.1)	70.2 (21.2)	72.7 (22.6)	76.4 (24.7)	80.0 (26.7)	83.0 (28.3)	84.4 (29.1)	84.6 (29.2)	83.2 (28.4)	80.1 (26.7)	74.7 (23.7)	70.7 (21.5)	77.3 (25.2)
Mean daily minimum °F (°C)	59.4 (15.2)	61.5 (16.4)	64.1 (17.8)	68.3 (20.2)	72.7 (22.6)	75.9 (24.4)	77.1 (25.1)	77.5 (25.3)	76.5 (24.7)	73.4 (23.0)	67.1 (19.5)	62.9 (17.2)	69.7 (20.9)
Mean minimum °F (°C)	42.3 (5.7)	46.0 (7.8)	49.6 (9.8)	58.0 (14.4)	64.4 (18.0)	71.4 (21.9)	72.3 (22.4)	73.3 (22.9)	72.3 (22.4)	62.1 (16.7)	53.2 (11.8)	49.1 (9.5)	39.9 (4.4)
Record low °F (°C)	34 (1)	35 (2)	40 (4)	51 (11)	56 (13)	67 (19)	69 (21)	69 (21)	67 (19)	46 (8)	43 (6)	34 (1)	34 (1)
Average precipitation inches (mm)	2.71 (69)	2.83 (72)	2.68 (68)	3.18 (81)	5.18 (132)	8.72 (221)	6.82 (173)	8.49 (216)	7.98 (203)	7.65 (194)	3.56 (90)	2.18 (55)	61.98 (1,574)
Average precipitation days (≥ 0.01 in)	8.5	7.7	7.2	7.4	11.6	17.8	17.4	18.6	17.9	14.2	10.0	9.7	148.0
Source: NOAA (mean maxima/minima 2006–2020)

== Demographics ==
Historical population
Census	Pop.	Note	%±
1970	7,403		—
1980	39,681		436.0%
1990	64,407		62.3%
2000	85,779		33.2%
2010	84,439		−1.6%
2020	97,335		15.3%
2024 (est.)	100,128	▲	2.9%
U.S. Decennial Census; 2020 Census

=== Racial and ethnic composition ===
Sunrise, Florida – racial and ethnic composition Note: the US Census treats Hispanic/Latino as an ethnic category. This table excludes Latinos from the racial categories and assigns them to a separate category. Hispanics/Latinos may be of any race.
Race / ethnicity (NH = non-Hispanic)	Pop. 1980	Pop. 1990	Pop. 2000	Pop. 2010	Pop. 2020
White alone (NH)	37,701 (95.01%)	52,969 (82.24%)	48,863 (56.96%)	31,016 (36.73%)	24,490 (25.16%)
Black or African American alone (NH)	295 (0.74%)	4,545 (7.06%)	17,176 (20.02%)	25,950 (30.73%)	30,270 (31.10%)
Native American or Alaska Native alone (NH)	—	46 (0.07%)	113 (0.13%)	159 (0.19%)	109 (0.11%)
Asian alone (NH)	—	1,210 (1.88%)	2,602 (3.03%)	3,374 (4.00%)	3,929 (4.04%)
Pacific Islander alone (NH)	—	—	55 (0.06%)	65 (0.08%)	70 (0.07%)
Other race alone (NH)	311 (0.78%)	72 (0.11%)	460 (0.54%)	543 (0.64%)	1,010 (1.04%)
Mixed race or multiracial (NH)	—	—	1,855 (2.16%)	1,711 (2.03%)	3,420 (3.51%)
Hispanic or Latino (any race)	1,374 (3.46%)	5,565 (8.64%)	14,655 (17.08%)	21,621 (25.61%)	34,037 (34.97%)
Total	39,681 (100.00%)	64,407 (100.00%)	85,779 (100.00%)	84,439 (100.00%)	97,335 (100.00%)

=== 2020 census ===
As of the 2020 census, Sunrise had a population of 97,335, with 37,348 households and 25,331 families. The population density was 6,008.70 inhabitants per square mile (2,320.0/km^{2}).

The median age was 41.0 years. 20.0% of residents were under the age of 18 and 18.5% of residents were 65 years of age or older. For every 100 females there were 87.3 males, and for every 100 females age 18 and over there were 83.3 males age 18 and over.

100.0% of residents lived in urban areas, while 0.0% lived in rural areas.

Of these households, 29.9% had children under the age of 18 living in them. 43.2% were married-couple households, 16.9% were households with a male householder and no spouse or partner present, and 33.4% were households with a female householder and no spouse or partner present. About 26.6% of all households were made up of individuals and 13.0% had someone living alone who was 65 years of age or older.

There were 40,490 housing units, of which 7.8% were vacant. The homeowner vacancy rate was 1.6% and the rental vacancy rate was 6.9%. The average housing unit density was 2,499.54 per square mile (965.1/km^{2}).

Racial composition as of the 2020 census
Race	Number	Percent
White	31,836	32.7%
Black or African American	31,167	32.0%
American Indian and Alaska Native	237	0.2%
Asian	4,046	4.2%
Native Hawaiian and Other Pacific Islander	79	0.1%
Some other race	9,184	9.4%
Two or more races	20,786	21.4%
Hispanic or Latino (of any race)	34,037	35.0%

=== 2010 census ===
As of the 2010 census, there were 84,439 people, 32,493 households, and _ families residing in the city. The population density was 4,666.43 inhabitants per square mile (1,801.7/km^{2}). There were 37,609 housing units at an average density of 2,078.42 per square mile (802.5/km^{2}). The racial makeup of the city was 56.40% White, 31.81% African American, 0.30% Native American, 4.07% Asian, 0.08% Pacific Islander, 4.05% from some other races and 3.28% from two or more races. Hispanic or Latino people of any race were 25.61% of the population.

=== 2000 census ===
As of 2000, 33.4% had children under the age of 18 living with them, 48.6% were married couples living together, 13.8% had a female householder with no husband present, and 33.2% were non-families. 27.2% of all households were made up of individuals, and 14.4% had someone living alone who was 65 years of age or older. The average household size was 2.54 and the average family size was 3.12.

In 2000, in the city, the population was spread out, with 24.9% under the age of 18, 7.3% from 18 to 24, 31.7% from 25 to 44, 18.4% from 45 to 64, and 17.7% who were 65 years of age or older. The median age was 37 years. For every 100 females, there were 87.9 males. For every 100 females age 18 and over, there were 82.5 males.

In 2000, the median income for a household in the city was $40,998, and the median income for a family was $47,908. Males had a median income of $35,706 versus $28,147 for females. The per capita income for the city was $18,713. About 7.3% of families and 9.7% of the population were below the poverty line, including 12.3% of those under age 18 and 12.5% of those age 65 or over.

As of 2000, speakers of English as a first language accounted for 71.92%, while Spanish was 16.75%, French Creole was at 2.53%, Yiddish at 1.14%, Portuguese at 1.01%, Italian at 0.84%, French at 0.83%, Hebrew at 0.61%, and Chinese at 0.59% of the population.

As of 2000, Sunrise had the 107th highest percentage of Cuban residents in the US, at 2.29% of the city's population, and the sixtieth highest percentage of Colombian residents in the US, at 2.44% of the city's population (tied with Weehawken, New Jersey.) It also had the fourteenth most Jamaican-populated area in the US, with 7.6% of all residents, and the fifty-third highest concentration of Haitians (tied with Lake Alfred and Miami Gardens' Bunche Park neighborhood) at 2.8% of the population.

== Economy ==
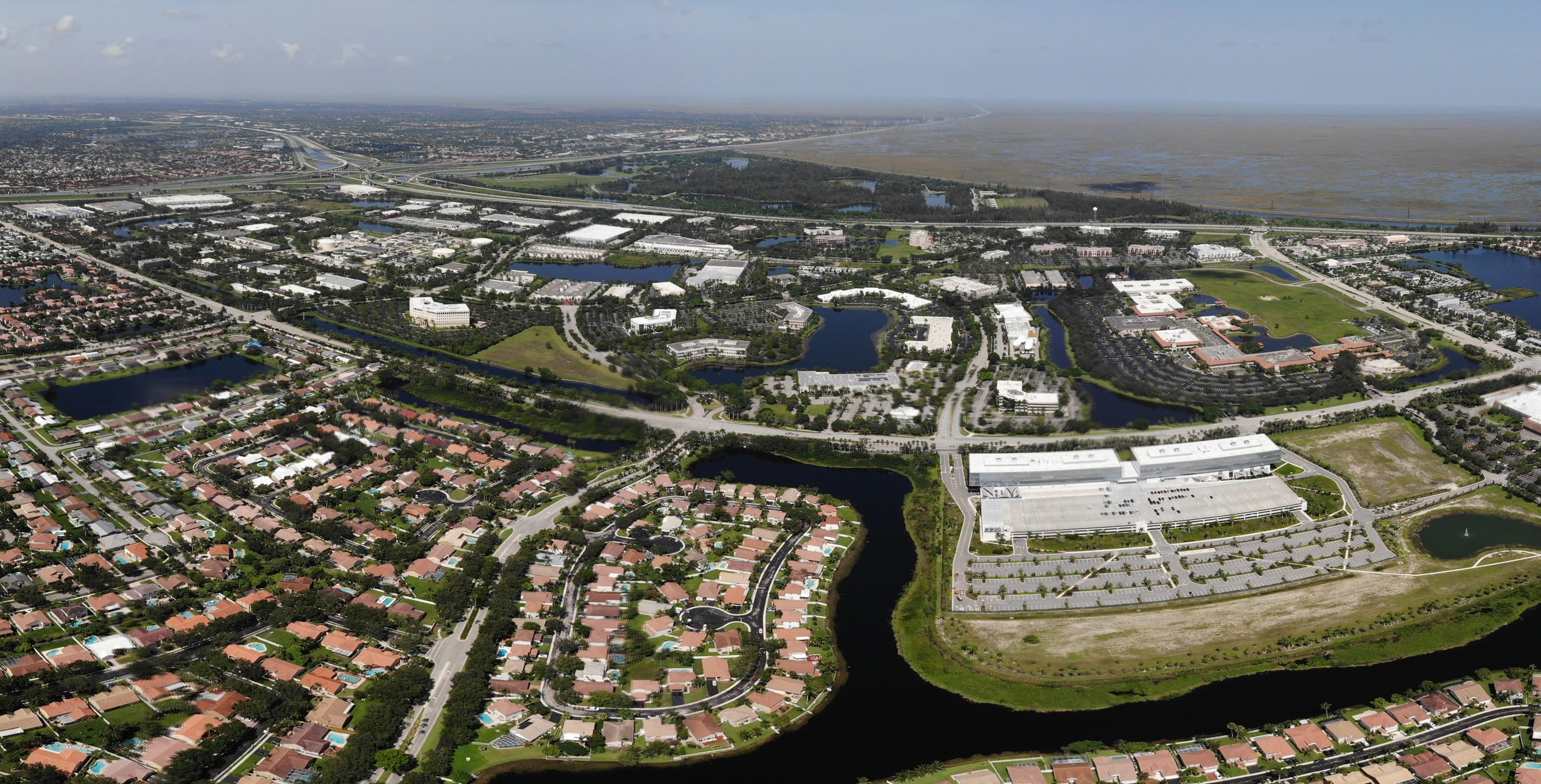
Panoramic aerial view of Sawgrass Corporate Parkway in Sunrise, showing the American Express offices with the Everglades and Weston visible in the background

Sunrise's tax base includes Amerant Bank Arena, Sawgrass Mills, Sawgrass International Corporate Park, IKEA and other commercial developments. Quality job creation through corporate attraction has long been a priority in the city.

Air France's United States reservations call center is located in the Sawgrass Technology Park in Sunrise.

CIGNA Healthcare has a large service and operations center in Sunrise.

Jazwares, a toy manufacturer, is headquartered here.

Emerson Electric Company announced on July 26, 2011, that it would locate its Latin America headquarters at Sawgrass International Corporate Park.

The City of Sunrise announced a New Homebuyer Incentive Program on January 20, 2012. Under this innovative new program, The City of Sunrise will reimburse homebuyers up to $2,000 for select improvements to a newly purchased single-family foreclosure or short sale home. The new program is an effort to attract new residents to Sunrise - and benefit existing residents by helping to improve the appearance and property values in Sunrise neighborhoods.

== Arts and culture ==
Sunrise hosts events throughout the year in celebration of holidays, seasons and other occasions. Highlights include:

Earth Day Festival: This celebration of green living sponsored by the city's Utilities Department. The Earth Day Festival features live music; children's rides and activities; a farmer's market; unique, handcrafted goods, ethnic and traditional foods, and eco-conscious organizations. Giveaways include BPA-free water bottles that can be filled throughout the day at the city's complimentary water station.

Cultural Festival: Designed to celebrate, highlight and unify the diverse cultures represented in the city, the festival showcases multi-ethnic foods, music, art, and dance. This event is held each November in City Park.

The Harvest Festival: This event, held each October, includes costume contests, horse-drawn hayrides and an old fashioned pumpkin patch.

Fourth of July Parade and Fireworks: This regional celebration begins with a patriotic parade, followed by a family-friendly party with free food, rides and live entertainment. The evening's events – made possible by a public/private partnership with the former Bank Atlantic Center, now BB&T Center – include fireworks and live music.

Woodstock: This annual event features hand-made crafts from local artists. Held the first weekend in December, it is a popular event and also features local musical talents, among other entertainment.

The Catholic Church in Sunrise is dedicated to All Saints.

== Sports ==
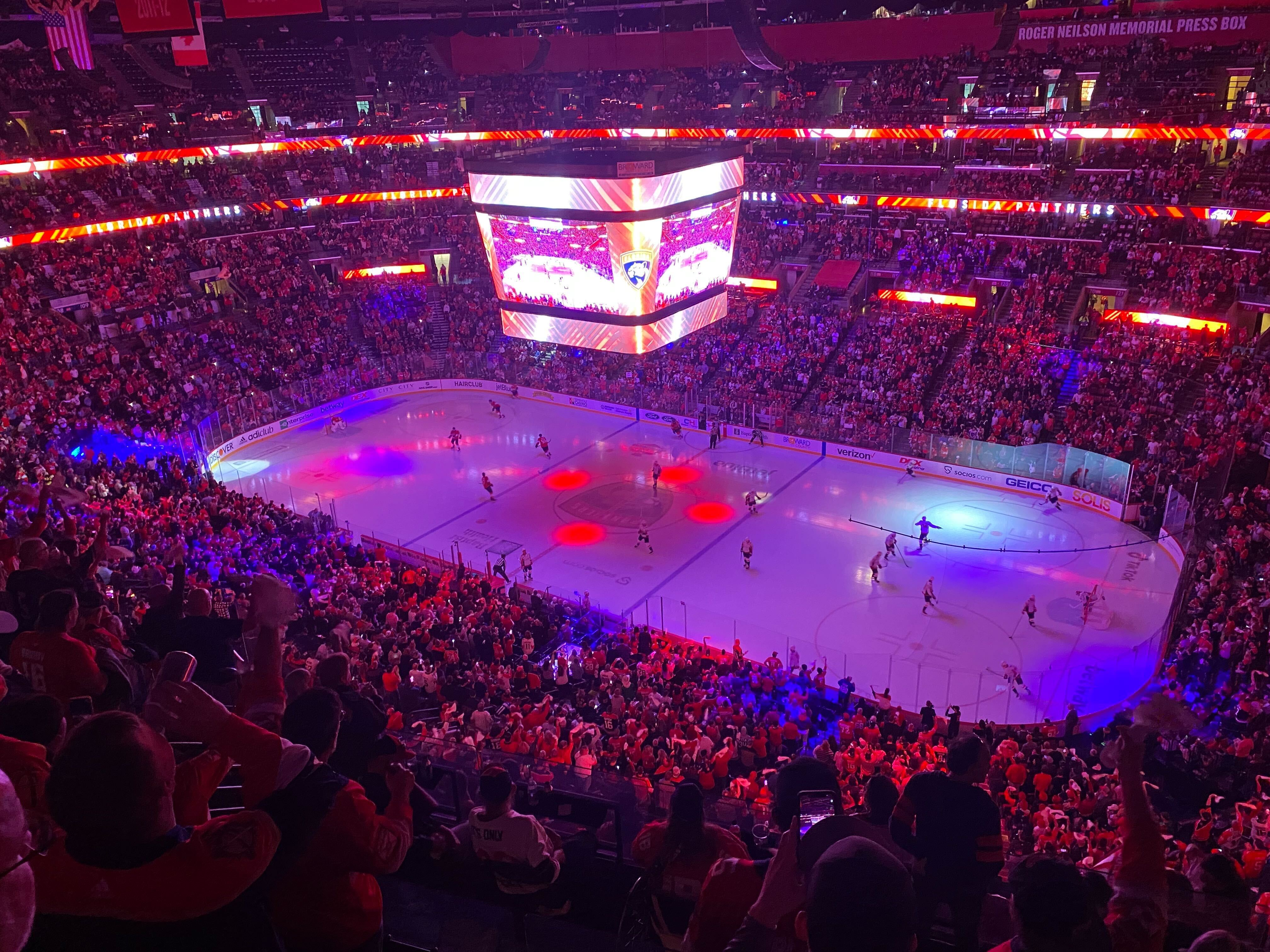
Pre Game at a Florida Panthers 2022 Stanley Cup playoffs game in Sunrise.

Sunrise's Amerant Bank Arena is the home of the Florida Panthers of the National Hockey League. The arena also hosts concerts, circuses, ice shows and other events. The venue's 2011 first-quarter, non-hockey attendance numbers ranked No. 4 in the United States and No. 17 in the world based on calculations by entertainment trade publication Pollstar. On June 24, 2024, the Panthers won their first Stanley Cup, with a 2–1 victory over the Edmonton Oilers, in the seventh game of the finals, on home ice in front of their fans. The Panthers repeated as champions in 2025, beating the Edmonton Oilers again in the finals 4 games to 2.

In 2015, the local girls youth soccer club Sunrise Soccer recorded three state championships out of six age groups (U14, U15, and U17). In 2016, the U15 and U17 teams qualified for the US Youth Soccer National League with the U15 finishing second and the U17 finishing third.

In 2010, Sunrise finished the complete renovation and rebranding of its executive course, Seven Bridges at Springtree Golf Club. The 67-acre facility first opened in 1972. It now features a 7,000-square-foot clubhouse with a pro shop, locker rooms and a 120-seat dining area available for breakfast, lunch and catered events.

The city also operates the 15-court Sunrise Tennis Club, three pools, and more than 250 acres of park land.

The Sunrise Suns Wheelchair Basketball Team originally began as a recreational team under the umbrella of Spinal Cord Injury Support Group, Broward chapter. Dr Lauren Lerner, Fran Wade and Sue Krinsky all of HealthSouth Sunrise Rehabilitation Hospital as well as members of the board of directors for the Spinal Cord Injury Support Group saw a need to develop a wheelchair basketball program for the disabled.

== Government ==
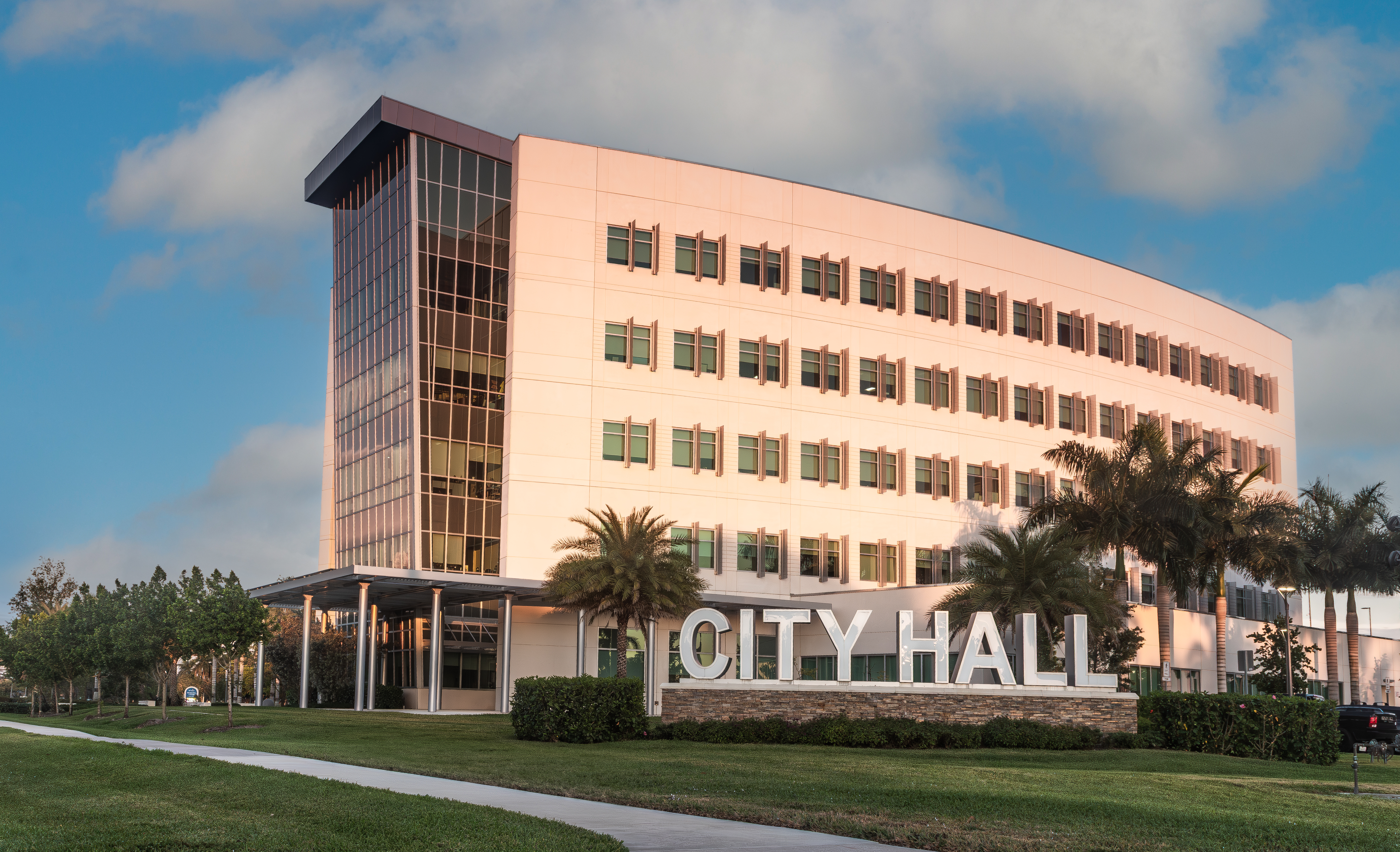
City of Sunrise Florida City Hall

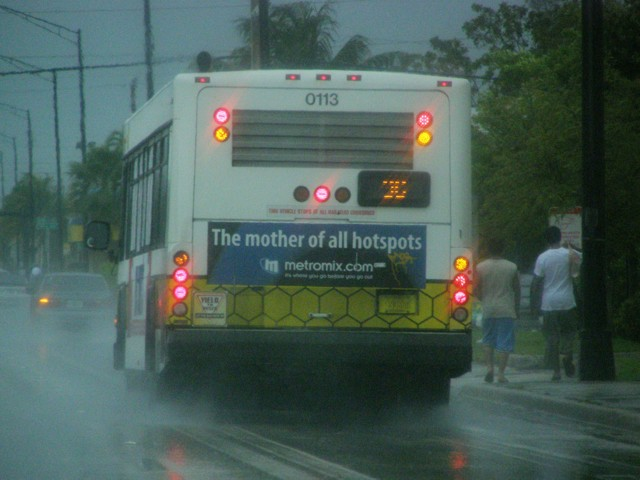
A Broward County Transit Bus in Sunrise.

The City of Sunrise operates under a commission/manager form of government, led by a mayor and four city commissioners who are elected to four-year terms on a non-partisan basis. The deputy mayor and assistant deputy mayor are selected on a rotating basis in March of each year.

It is the commission's responsibility to set policy, establish laws and adopt the city's budget. The commission-appointed city manager oversees the day-to-day operations of Sunrise.

Commission meetings are typically conducted on the second and fourth Tuesday of each month in City Hall. Live and archived video of public meetings is available on www.sunrisefl.gov. Meetings are also rebroadcast on local Comcast Cable Channel 78.

Sunrise is a full-service city with a comprehensive array of departments, including: Finance and Administrative Services, City Attorney, City Clerk, City Manager, Community Development, Leisure Services, Information Technology, Human Resources, and Utilities.

=== Infrastructure ===
The Sunrise Utilities Department operates a water and wastewater system that spans approximately 70 miles and serves more than 200,000 residential and commercial customers. The system consists of over 500 miles of water distribution mains; over 600 miles of sewer piping and mains; 200 wastewater and pump stations; three water treatment facilities; four water re-pump facilities and three wastewater treatment plants.

The Utilities Department also oversees the sixth largest municipal gas system in Florida, serving nearly 10,000 homes and businesses.

== Education ==
Sunrise is home to 11 public schools – eight elementary schools, two middle schools, and one high school – operated by Broward County Public Schools. Higher education is offered by nearby public and private institutions, including Broward College, Barry University and Nova Southeastern University.

=== Elementary schools ===
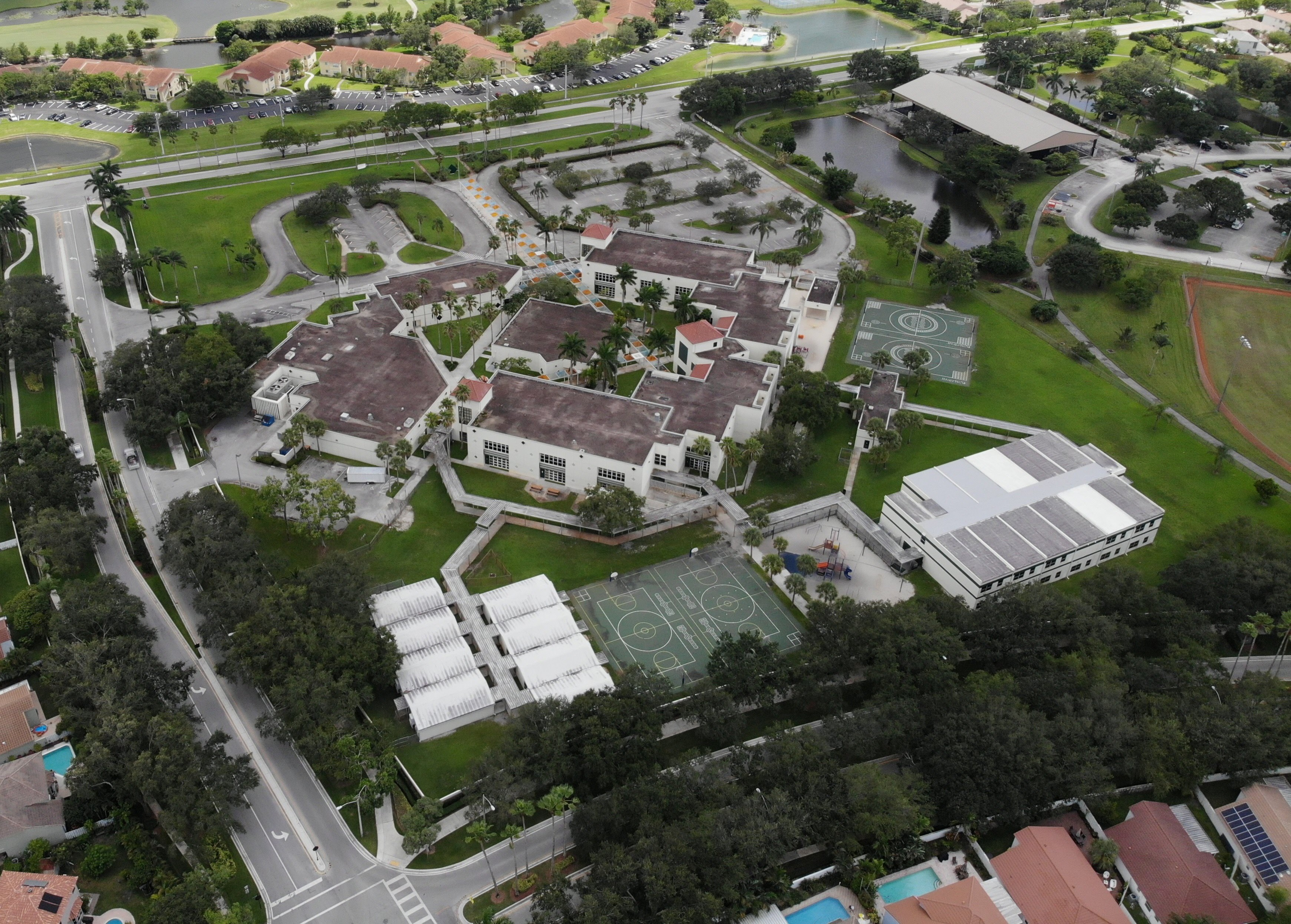
An aerial photograph of Sawgrass Elementary School.

- Banyan Elementary School (It opened c. 1981. In 2012, a $1.3 million media center was installed.)
- Discovery Elementary School
- Horizon Elementary School
- Nob Hill Elementary School
- Sandpiper Elementary School (Opened 1989)
- Sawgrass Elementary School (Opened 1993)
- Village Elementary School
- Welleby Elementary School

=== Middle schools ===
- Bair Middle School (Opened 1975)
- Westpine Middle School (Opened 1991)

=== High schools ===
- Piper High School

=== Private schools ===
- Franklin Academy (Opened 2015)
- Harvard Academy
- Nob Hill Academy
- Salah Tawfik Elementary & Middle School
