= Antioch Missionary Baptist Church of Miami Gardens =

Coordinates: 25.969673°N 80.257737°W

- Antioch Missionary Baptist Church of Miami Gardens
- Location: 21311 Northwest 34th Avenue, Miami Gardens, Florida 33056
- Country: United States
- Denomination: Baptist
- Website: antiochfl.com

History
- Founded: 1957
- Founder: James A. Rudolph

The Antioch Missionary Baptist Church of Miami Gardens is a Baptist megachurch in Lake Lucerne, Miami Gardens, a suburb of Miami, Florida, USA that provides a blend of traditional and contemporary worship. It is affiliated with the National Baptist Convention, USA. The senior pastor is Arthur Jackson, III.

== History ==
The church was founded in 1957 in a small house. In 1961, a new building was dedicated. Pastors in the early years were James A. Rudolph, Albert Essex, John C. Cherry, and Floyd W. Larkin who was pastor from 1985 to 1990.

With a growing congregation, Cherry arranged to purchase two lots adjacent to the church. Construction of a larger building began in 1973 and was finally completed under the leadership of Larkin in 1985. The congregation continued to increase, and the church purchased three more lots, on which the present building stands, during Larkin's tenure as pastor. The $2 million 2,000 seat sanctuary and administrative building was built in 1998, and seven years later all debts had been paid off.

The Miami Gardens Campus was in the Lake Lucerne census-designated place, in an unincorporated area, until Miami Gardens incorporated in 2003.

In a 2008 survey, Outreach Magazine ranked the church 97th largest in the USA based on average weekly attendance of 7,000.

In 2021, a new 2,500 seat sanctuary was dedicated.

== Community involvement ==
The church holds an annual Family Fall Festival, which offers families games, rides, prizes, costume contest, music, candy and refreshments. In December 2009 the Antioch Missionary Baptist Church held a National Mentoring Training Day event to encourage adults to become more engaged in the community as mentors. In January 2010 the church held its Annual Fresh Start Fitness Health Fair. The purpose was to encourage activities that help eliminate or reduce blood pressure levels, diabetes, and high cholesterol. The church joined the 50 Million Pound Challenge, a weight loss competition, coming first among churches.

The former Vice-Mayor of the city of Miami Gardens, Aaron Campbell, Jr., is a member of the church. In January 2010 the church was working with the city of Miami Gardens to collect donations for Haiti relief efforts following the major earthquake in the island. The church acted as a collection center for donated goods.

== See also ==
- List of the largest churches in the USA
