= Dousman, Wisconsin =

- Village
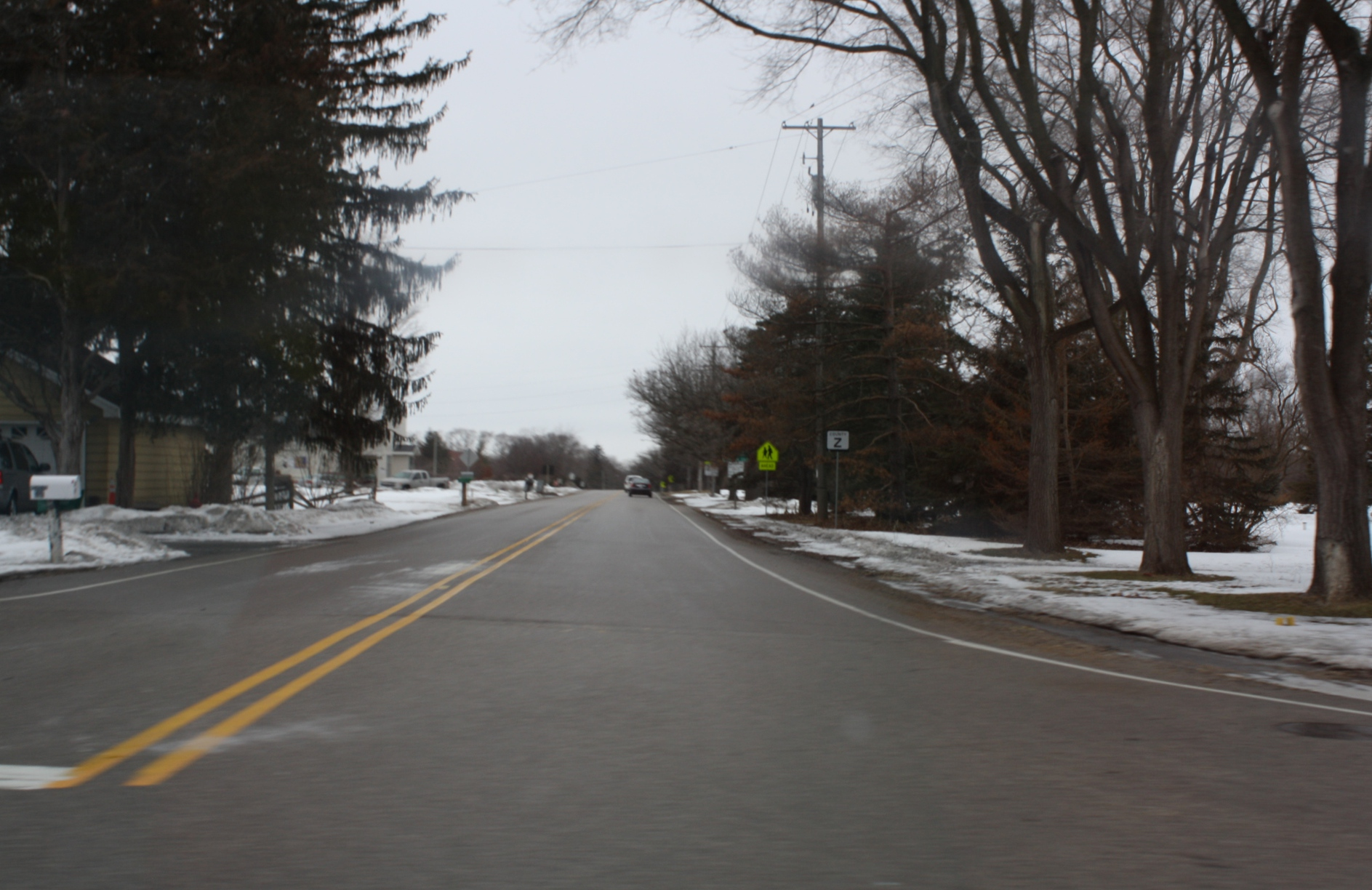
- Looking west at Dousman

- Location of Dousman in Waukesha County, Wisconsin.
- Coordinates: 43°0′53″N 88°28′21″W
- Country: United States
- State: Wisconsin
- County: Waukesha
- Settled: May 6, 1882

Area
  - Total: 2.77 sq mi (7.17 km^{2})
  - Land: 2.63 sq mi (6.82 km^{2})
  - Water: 0.14 sq mi (0.35 km^{2})
- Elevation: 866 ft (264 m)

Population (2020)
  - Total: 2,419
  - Density: 884.6/sq mi (341.54/km^{2})
- Time zone: UTC-6 (Central (CST))
  - Summer (DST): UTC-5 (CDT)
- ZIP Code: 53118
- Area code: 262
- FIPS code: 55-20550
- GNIS feature ID: 1564086
- Website: villageofdousman.gov

Dousman is a village in Waukesha County, Wisconsin, United States. The population was 2,419 at the 2020 census.

== History ==
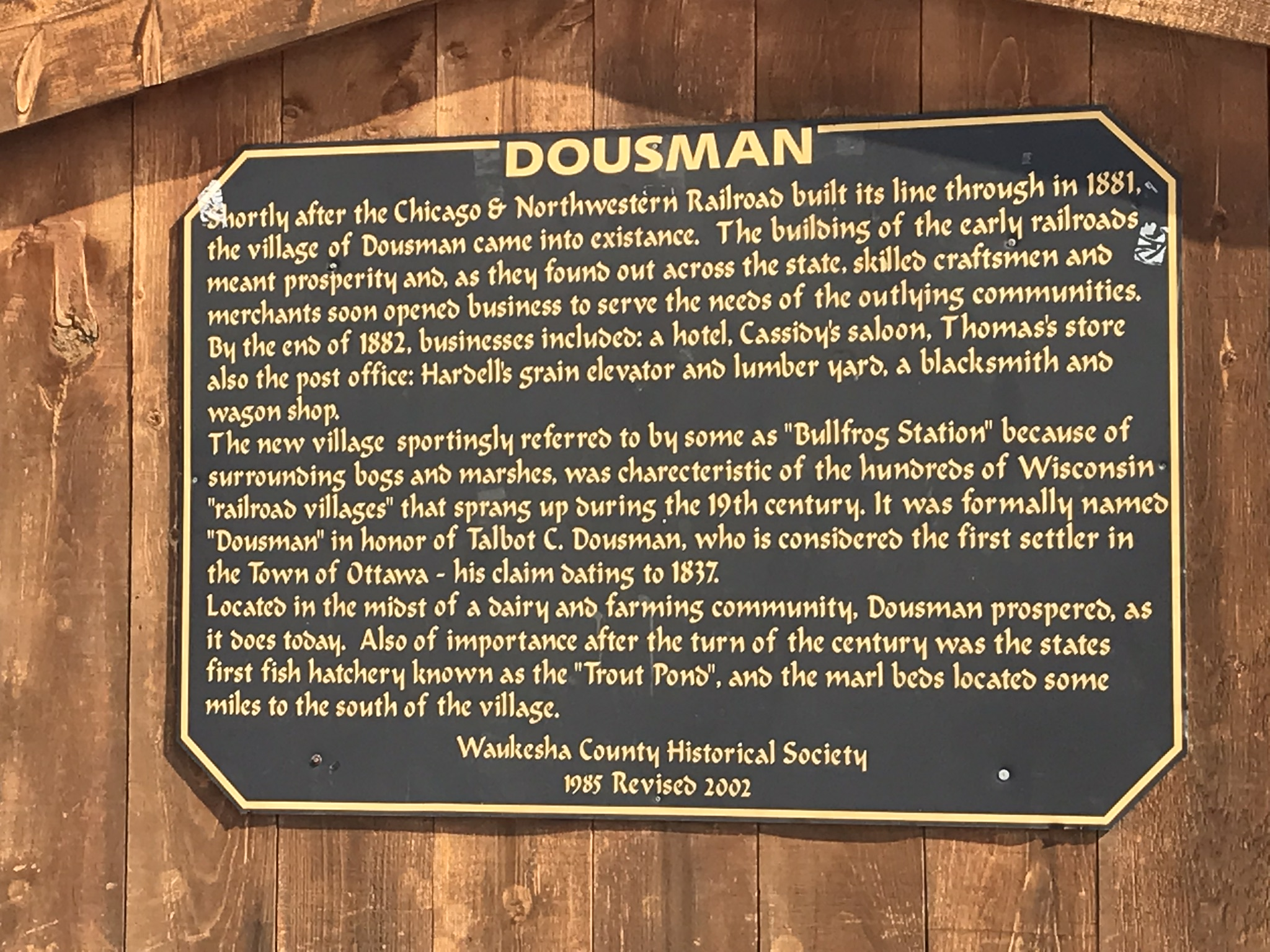
Historic marker in Cory Park

A post office called Dousman has been in operation since 1856. Founded in 1881, the village was named for Talbot C. Dousman, a local farmer and businessman who helped bring the Chicago and North Western railroad to the area. The village was incorporated in 1917.

The village was once called "Bullfrog Station" because of the numerous bullfrogs in the area. The local baseball team is still called the Dousman Frogs and an annual frog jumping competition takes place during Dousman's Derby Days.

== Geography ==
Dousman is located at 43°0′53″N 88°28′21″W (43.014801, −88.472564).

According to the United States Census Bureau, the village has a total area of 2.68 square miles (6.94 km^{2}), of which 2.58 square miles (6.68 km^{2}) is land and 0.10 square miles (0.26 km^{2}) is water.

The Glacial Drumlin State Trail, a 47-mile-long (76 km) hiking-biking-snowmobile trail that runs east–west between the towns of Cottage Grove and Waukesha, passes through the middle of Dousman. The trail lies on the former roadbed of the Chicago & Northwestern Railway.

== Demographics ==
Historical population
| Census | Pop. | Note | %± |
|---|---|---|---|
| 1920 | 235 | | — |
| 1930 | 256 | | 8.9% |
| 1940 | 272 | | 6.3% |
| 1950 | 328 | | 20.6% |
| 1960 | 410 | | 25.0% |
| 1970 | 451 | | 10.0% |
| 1980 | 1,153 | | 155.7% |
| 1990 | 1,277 | | 10.8% |
| 2000 | 1,584 | | 24.0% |
| 2010 | 2,302 | | 45.3% |
| 2020 | 2,419 | | 5.1% |
U.S. Decennial Census

=== 2010 census ===
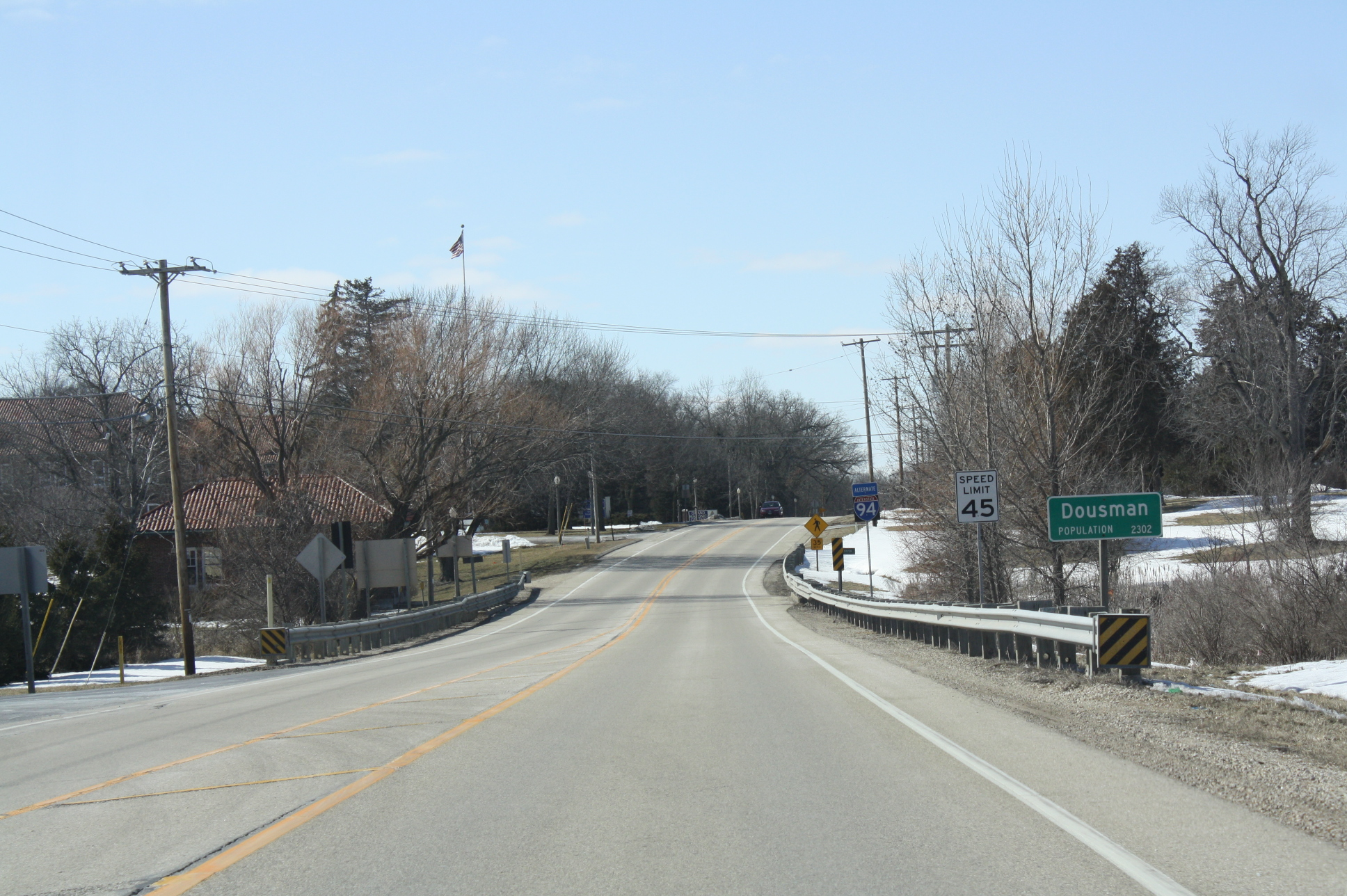
Entering Dousman looking west

As of the census of 2010, there were 2,302 people, 905 households, and 585 families living in the village. The population density was 892.2 inhabitants per square mile (344.5/km^{2}). There were 975 housing units at an average density of 377.9 per square mile (145.9/km^{2}). The racial makeup of the village was 96.8% White, 0.7% African American, 0.5% Native American, 0.9% Asian, 0.1% from other races, and 1.0% from two or more races. Hispanic or Latino of any race were 2.9% of the population.

There were 905 households, of which 35.5% had children under the age of 18 living with them, 51.8% were married couples living together, 9.0% had a female householder with no husband present, 3.9% had a male householder with no wife present, and 35.4% were non-families. 30.8% of all households were made up of individuals, and 19.3% had someone living alone who was 65 years of age or older. The average household size was 2.44 and the average family size was 3.08.

The median age in the village was 40.9 years. 26.2% of residents were under the age of 18; 6.1% were between the ages of 18 and 24; 24.4% were from 25 to 44; 25.1% were from 45 to 64; and 18.1% were 65 years of age or older. The gender makeup of the village was 46.5% male and 53.5% female.

=== 2000 census ===
As of the census of 2000, there were 1,584 people, 575 households, and 393 families living in the village. The population density was 1,284.2 people per square mile (497.2/km^{2}). There were 587 housing units at an average density of 475.9 per square mile (184.3/km^{2}). The racial makeup of the village was 96.59% White, 0.57% African American, 0.06% Native American, 0.82% Asian, 0.57% from other races, and 1.39% from two or more races. Hispanic or Latino of any race were 2.34% of the population.

Of the 575 households, 39.7% had children under the age of 18 living with them, 49.0% were married couples living together, 15.0% had a female householder with no husband present, and 31.5% were non-families. Some 24.7% of all households were made up of individuals, and 9.9% had someone living alone who was 65 years of age or older. The average household size was 2.58 and the average family size was 3.11.

In the village, the population was spread out, with 27.7% under the age of 18, 7.6% from 18 to 24, 32.4% from 25 to 44, 16.9% from 45 to 64, and 15.3% who were 65 years of age or older. The median age was 35 years. For every 100 females, there were 91.1 males. For every 100 females age 18 and over, there were 86.9 males.

The median income for a household in the village was $46,944, and the median income for a family was $53,409. Males had a median income of $40,677 versus $30,882 for females. The per capita income for the village was $21,722. About 3.0% of families and 4.5% of the population were below the poverty line, including 9.2% of those under age 18 and 2.4% of those age 65 or over.

== Law enforcement ==
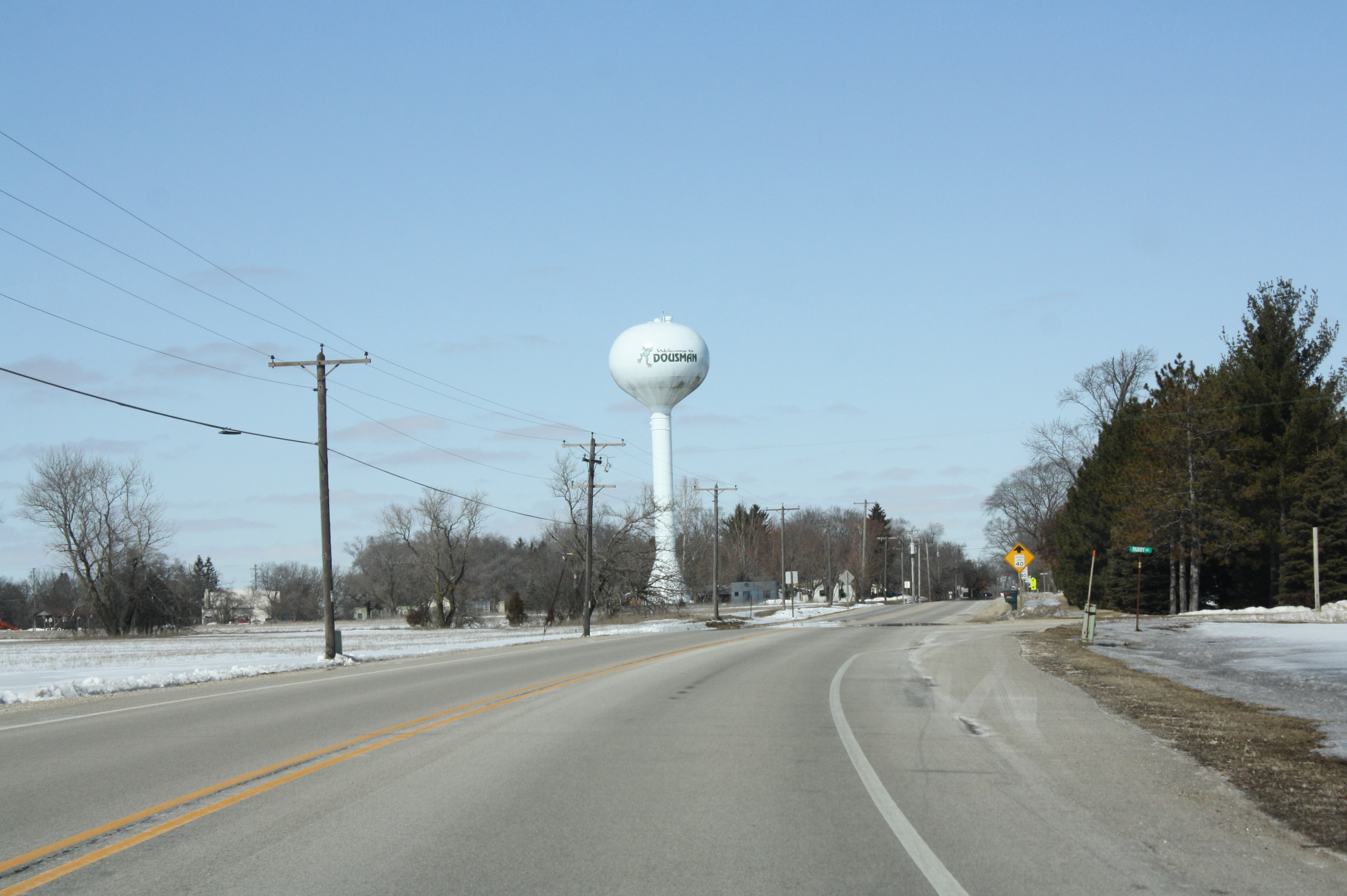
Entering Dousman from the south

Dousman has a volunteer fire department with 48 trained firefighters and EMTs.

The Village of Dousman contracts with the Village of Summit for Police Protection.

== Education ==
- Dousman Elementary School, public grade school
- Kettle Moraine Middle School, public middle school
- Lad Lake, residential treatment center
- St. Bruno Private School

== Notable residents ==
- Brianna Decker, ice hockey player & Olympic gold medalist, member of the gold medal-winning United States Women's national Hockey team at the 2018 Winter Olympics
- J. H. Smith, former mayor of Dousman and co-founder of the city of Anchorage, Alaska
