= Earl Sampson =

Plaintiff in 2013 US civil rights lawsuit

- Known for: Being repeatedly arrested by police for trespassing while at his own place of employment

Earl Sampson is a black man from Miami Gardens, Florida, who, beginning in 2008, was repeatedly arrested by police for trespassing while he was at his own place of employment. His federal civil rights lawsuit against the city was settled under undisclosed terms in 2015.

== Incidents ==
The Miami Gardens Police Department convinced the owner of the Quickstop convenience store, Alex Saleh, to sign up for "The Zero-Tolerance Zone Trespassing Program". Afterwards police began targeting black customers who were standing in line to buy items at the store. Police officers also focused their attention on Sampson, whose only criminal conviction was for marijuana possession.

During the five-year period from 2008 to 2013, Sampson was "unlawfully stopped-and-frisked, searched, seized, and/or arrested 288 times," for a total of 63 arrests, 33 of which resulted in court action. He was also searched over 100 times and jailed at least 56 times; the majority of these events occurred at the Quickstop.

Sampson pleaded guilty to the trespassing charges filed against him, since pleading not guilty would have meant remaining in jail, posting bond, meeting trial dates, and spending money.

Saleh, who had known Sampson since he was 14, criticized the police for targeting Sampson, but the targeting continued, and began occurring throughout Miami Gardens. Saleh filed a complaint with internal affairs at the MGPD, which only resulted in an increase of aggression and targeting by police officers towards his store and their customers. In response, Saleh installed 15 cameras in his store, and used the resulting videotapes to prove that Sampson was behaving properly when targeted by police. In 2012, Saleh filed a complaint with the State Attorney, but the office declined to investigate the claim.

A portion of a February 2015 This American Life episode, "Inconvenience Store", Act One of "548: Cops See It Differently, Part Two," chronicled the Sampson incident. Conor Friedersdorf of The Atlantic wrote, "Neither a public defender nor a judge was able to spot or stop this miscarriage of justice either. No one inside the system successfully exposed or remedied the abusive situation. Things only changed for Sampson when the store owner got video evidence and took it to the media."

== Legal response ==
In November 2013, Sampson and 10 other similarly targeted individuals filed a federal civil rights lawsuit in the US District Court for the Southern District of Florida against the city of Miami Gardens, its mayor, city manager, chief of police, and numerous individual members of the Miami Gardens Police Department. The parties reached a settlement on June 23, 2015, details of which are unknown.

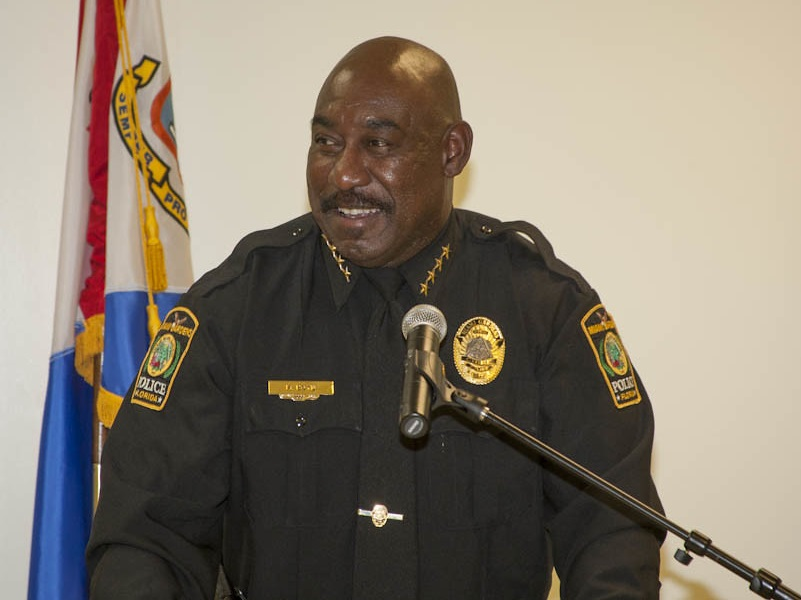
Miami Gardens’ police chief Matthew Boyd

A month after the lawsuit was filed, Police Chief Matthew Boyd suddenly resigned, though sources inside the department allege it was part of a previously announced plan to retire the following month. Many of the officers named in the lawsuit continued to work for the MGPD after the settlement. Miami Gardens Mayor, Oliver Gilbert, and City Manager, Cameron Benson, announced they would launch an investigation into the incident, and that "any officers who violated laws will be disciplined — up to and including being fired." No outcome or proceeds of this investigation have been released.

=== Officer Jose Rosado ===
One of the officers named in the lawsuit, Jose Rosado, opted to help Sampson and his fellow plaintiffs rather than siding with the police department, claiming he "consistently took issue" with the excessive directives given by his supervisors. Rosado provided information regarding law violations and public waste committed by police department staff to city officials in 2014 as well as via a sworn affidavit in the Sampson lawsuit a year later. In particular, Rosado mentioned a supervisor named Maj. Anthony Chapman who directed him to "target black males between the ages of 15 and 30 and to conduct more field contacts with all such individuals regardless of probable cause." In his sworn affidavit, Rosado noted that he never reported any of this misconduct in the past because he'd been threatened with termination should he do so.

Rosado was subsequently fired from the MGPD in 2015 and filed a lawsuit the following year alleging wrongful termination. In the suit, he claims to have suffered harassment, denial of assignments and opportunities because of not being a "team player," multiple unsubstantiated complaints filed against him, and retaliation specifically from Maj. Chapman, who continued to be employed by the department. His lawsuit was unsuccessful.
