= Sunshine State Arch =

- U.S. National Register of Historic Places
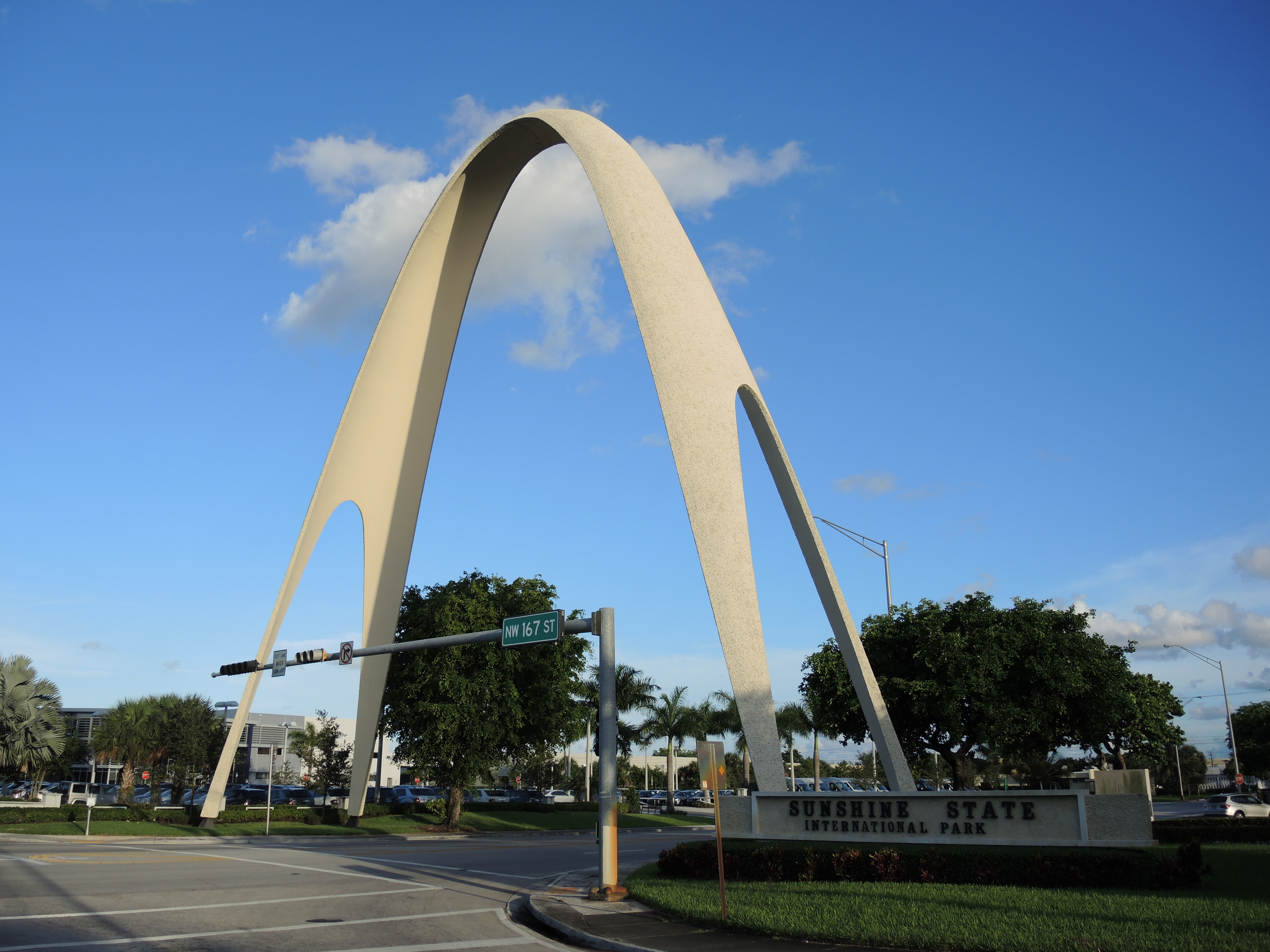
- Sunshine State Arch

- Location within Miami Location within Florida Location within the United States
- Location: Miami Gardens, Florida
- Coordinates: 25°55′37″N 80°13′18″W
- NRHP reference No.: 14000210
- Added to NRHP: May 19, 2014

Sunshine State Arch is a national historic site located at the intersection between NW 13th Ave. and NW 167th St., at the entrance to the Sunshine State Industrial Park (Sunshine State International Park, Inc.) in Miami Gardens, Miami-Dade County, Florida, USA. It was inspired by the monumental Gateway Arch in St. Louis. The Sunshine State Arch was finished in 1964, three years before the Gateway Arch. It was designed by Walter C. Harry.

It was added to the National Register of Historic Places in 2014.
