= Merchandize Liquidators =

American wholesale liquidator and distributor

- Company type: LLC
- Founded: Florida, U.S. (2003)
- Headquarters: Charlotte, North Carolina, U.S.
- Area served: North America, Europe, Latin America
- Products: wholesale clothing, shoes, cosmetics, general merchandise, toys, health and beauty, electronics
- Website: Merchandizeliquidators.com

Merchandize Liquidators is an American wholesale liquidator and distributor in the reverse logistics industry. Working with manufacturers, national retailers and department stores, the company specializes in buying all available overstock merchandise. The company works on bringing products from major US retailers to the secondary markets. The company also sells new, overstock, surplus, used and salvaged goods. Merchandize Liquidators was cited by Inc. Magazine as one of the fastest-growing companies in the US in 2012 2011 and 2010.

== History ==
In 2010, 2011 and 2012, Inc. named it one of the fastest-growing companies in the nation. In 2012, Merchandize Liquidators doubled its revenues. Merchandize Liquidators 2011 percentage revenue growth for the four-year period through 2011 was more than 700 percent, according to a report by a leading trade publication. Merchandize Liquidators was ranked #523 on the Inc. 5000 list for 2011, which was published in August 2012. The report also ranked the company #18 in Miami, and #35 for Business Products and Services.

As of 2016, Merchandize Liquidators was acquired by a private equity group. The company is currently headquartered to Charlotte, NC and has multiple locations across the country.

== Recognition ==
- Inc. Magazine, Fastest Growing Companies in the US, 2012
- Inc. Magazine, Fastest Growing Companies in the US, 2011
- Inc. Magazine, Fastest Growing Companies in the US, 2010
