= Scott Lake, Florida =

Scott Lake
- Neighborhood of Miami Gardens
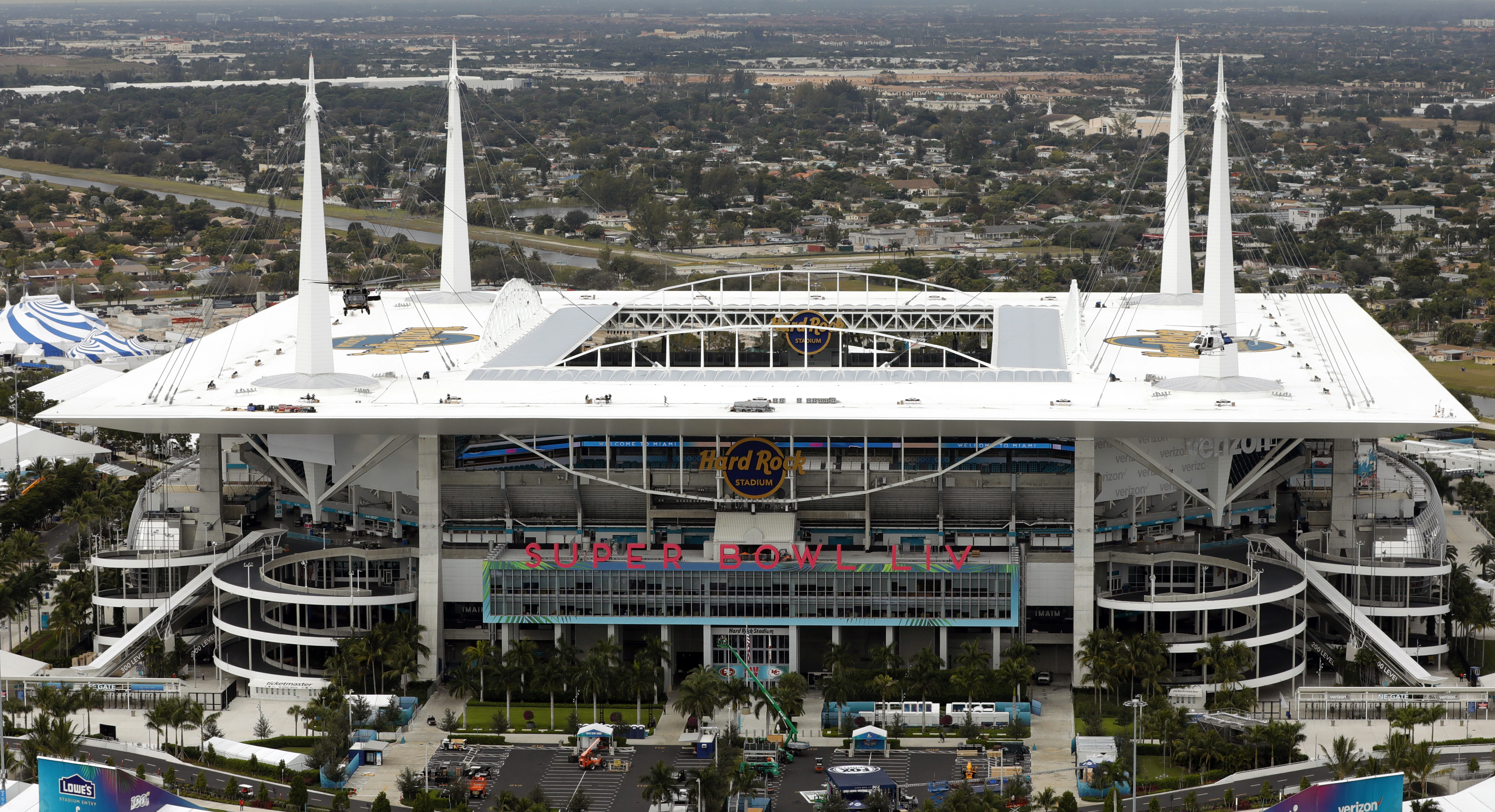
- Hard Rock Stadium, January 2020

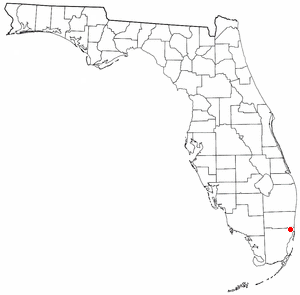
- Location in the state of Florida
- Coordinates: 25°56′8″N 80°13′55″W
- Country: United States
- State: Florida
- County: Miami-Dade
- City: Miami Gardens

Area
  - Total: 3.4 sq mi (8.7 km^{2})
  - Land: 3.3 sq mi (8.5 km^{2})
  - Water: 0.077 sq mi (0.2 km^{2})

Population (2000)
  - Total: 14,401
  - Density: 4,378/sq mi (1,690.5/km^{2})
- Time zone: UTC-5 (Eastern (EST))
  - Summer (DST): UTC-4 (EDT)
- ZIP code: 33056
- FIPS code: 12-64587

Scott Lake is a neighborhood in Miami Gardens, Florida. It was formerly its own census-designated place. The population was 14,401 at the 2000 census.

== Geography ==
Scott Lake is located at 25°56′8″N 80°13′55″W (25.935521, -80.231993).

According to the U.S. Census Bureau, the CDP has a total area of 8.7 km^{2} (3.4 sq mi). 8.5 km^{2} (3.3 sq mi) of it is land and 0.2 km^{2} (0.077 sq mi) of it (1.79%) is water.

== Demographics ==
Historical population
Census	Pop.	Note	%±
1980	14,154		—
1990	14,588		3.1%
2000	14,401		−1.3%
U.S. Decennial Census; 1990 2000

=== 2000 census ===
Scott Lake CDP, Florida – Racial and ethnic composition Note: the US Census treats Hispanic/Latino as an ethnic category. This table excludes Latinos from the racial categories and assigns them to a separate category. Hispanics/Latinos may be of any race.
Race / Ethnicity (NH = Non-Hispanic)	Pop 2000	% 2000
White alone (NH)	287	1.99%
Black or African American alone (NH)	12,916	89.69%
Native American or Alaska Native alone (NH)	17	0.12%
Asian alone (NH)	56	0.39%
Native Hawaiian or Pacific Islander alone (NH)	4	0.03%
Other race alone (NH)	50	0.35%
Mixed race or Multiracial (NH)	282	1.96%
Hispanic or Latino (any race)	789	5.48%
Total	14,401	100.00%

As of the census of 2000, there were 14,401 people, 4,033 households, and 3,440 families residing in the CDP. The population density was 1,690.0 people/km^{2} (4,377 people/mi^{2}). There were 4,159 housing units at an average density of 488.1 units/km^{2} (1,264 units/mi^{2}). The racial makeup of the CDP is 4.65% White (2% were Non-Hispanic White,) 91.20% African American, 0.18% Native American, 0.41% Asian, 0.04% Pacific Islander, 1.01% from other races, and 2.51% from two or more races. Hispanic or Latino of any race were 5.48% of the population.

There were 4,033 households, out of which 40.0% had children under the age of 18 living with them, 49.5% were married couples living together, 29.1% had a female householder with no husband present, and 14.7% were non-families. 11.1% of all households were made up of individuals, and 2.7% had someone living alone who was 65 years of age or older. The average household size was 3.57 and the average family size was 3.79.

In the CDP, the population was spread out, with 31.3% under the age of 18, 10.3% from 18 to 24, 26.1% from 25 to 44, 25.2% from 45 to 64, and 7.1% who were 65 years of age or older. The median age was 31 years. For every 100 females, there were 86.7 males. For every 100 females age 18 and over, there were 80.5 males.

The median income for a household in the CDP was $47,668, and the median income for a family was $47,586. Males had a median income of $31,250 versus $27,572 for females. The per capita income for the CDP was $15,740. About 12.5% of families and 16.4% of the population were below the poverty line, including 24.2% of those under age 18 and 15.9% of those age 65 or over.

As of 2000, before being annexed to Miami Gardens, English as a first language accounted for 85.76% of all residents, while 6.81% spoke Spanish, French Creole accounted for 5.83%, French was at 0.93%, and Jamaican Creole as a mother tongue made up 0.64% of the population.

== Education ==
The Miami-Dade County Public Schools operates area public schools. Schools in the former CDP include:

- Crestview Elementary School
- Parkview Elementary School
- Scott Lake Elementary School

== Parks and recreation ==
Hard Rock Stadium is in the former Scott Lake CDP.
