= Bunche Park, Florida =

Bunche Park
- Neighborhood of Miami Gardens
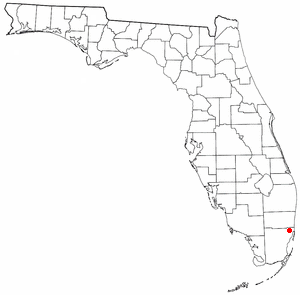
- Location in the state of Florida
- Coordinates: 25°55′19″N 80°14′4″W
- Country: United States
- State: Florida
- County: Miami-Dade
- City: Miami Gardens

Area
  - Total: 0.77 sq mi (2.0 km^{2})
  - Land: 0.77 sq mi (2.0 km^{2})
  - Water: 0 sq mi (0.0 km^{2})

Population (2000)
  - Total: 9,972
  - Density: 5,240/sq mi (2,023.2/km^{2})
- Time zone: UTC-5 (Eastern (EST))
  - Summer (DST): UTC-4 (EDT)
- ZIP code: 33054
- FIPS code: 12-09500

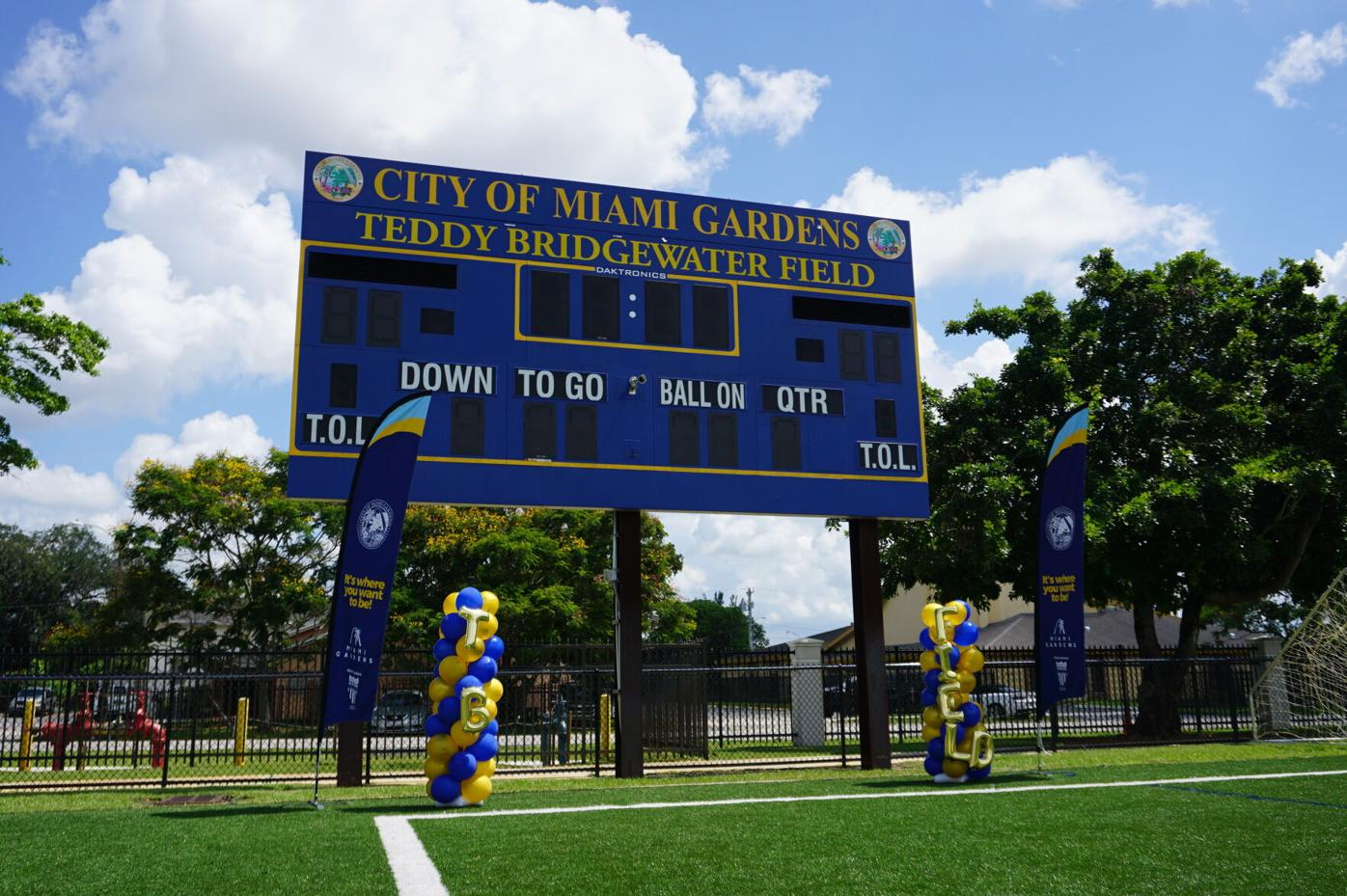
Bunche Park Football Field

Bunche Park is a neighborhood in Miami Gardens, Florida, adjacent to Opa-Locka, and just 23 minutes north of Downtown Miami. The neighborhood is home to one of the largest sport programs in Miami-Dade County, especially known for its football culture. The area is named after Dr. Ralph Bunche, a civil rights leader and the first African American to win a Nobel Peace Prize. The neighborhood has the third-most largest Bahamian population in Dade County.

== Geography ==
Bunche Park is located at 25°55′19″N 80°14′4″W (25.921871, -80.234469).

According to the United States Census Bureau, the CDP has a total area of 2.0 km^{2} (0.77 sq mi), all land.

== Demographics ==
Historical population
Census	Pop.	Note	%±
1970	5,773		—
1990	4,388		—
2000	3,972		−9.5%

Bunche Park CDP, Florida – Racial and ethnic composition Note: the US Census treats Hispanic/Latino as an ethnic category. This table excludes Latinos from the racial categories and assigns them to a separate category. Hispanics/Latinos may be of any race.
Race / Ethnicity (NH = Non-Hispanic)	Pop 2000	% 2000
White alone (NH)	13	0.33%
Black or African American alone (NH)	9,792	95.47%
Native American or Alaska Native alone (NH)	2	0.05%
Asian alone (NH)	5	0.13%
Native Hawaiian or Pacific Islander alone (NH)	0	0.00%
Other race alone (NH)	6	0.15%
Mixed race or Multiracial (NH)	33	0.83%
Hispanic or Latino (any race)	121	3.05%
Total	9,972	100.00%

As of the census of 2000, there were 3,972 people, 1,350 households, and 981 families residing in the CDP. The population density was 2,017.9 people/km^{2} (5,226 people/mi^{2}). There were 1,432 housing units at an average density of 727.5 units/km^{2} (1,884 units/mi^{2}). The racial makeup of the CDP was 1.36% White, 96.45% Blacks or African American, 0.08% Native American, 0.13% Asian, 0.63% from other races, and 1.36% from two or more races. Hispanic or Latino of any race were 3.05% of the population.

In 2000 Bunche Park was the place in the United States that had the highest percentage of Bahamians, with 3.8% of the population reporting this ancestry.

There were 1,350 households, out of which 25.4% had children under the age of 18 living with them, 29.7% were married couples living together, 34.4% had a female householder with no husband present, and 27.3% were non-families. 24.1% of all households were made up of individuals, and 13.8% had someone living alone who was 65 years of age or older. The average household size was 2.93 and the average family size was 3.45.

In the CDP, the population was spread out, with 28.4% under the age of 18, 7.9% from 18 to 24, 24.7% from 25 to 44, 17.7% from 45 to 64, and 21.3% who were 65 years of age or older. The median age was 38 years. For every 100 females, there were 83.8 males. For every 100 females age 18 and over, there were 75.9 males.

The median income for a household in the CDP was $25,898, and the median income for a family was $28,645. Males had a median income of $25,677 versus $22,259 for females. The per capita income for the CDP was $11,438. About 22.5% of families and 27.0% of the population were below the poverty line, including 38.4% of those under age 18 and 20.2% of those age 65 or over.

As of 2000, before being annexed to Miami Gardens, English as a first language accounted for 95.97% of all residents, while Spanish was at 3.07%, and French Creole as a mother tongue made up 0.94% of the population.

As of 2000, the Bunche Park section of Miami Gardens had the ninth highest percentage of African-American and black residents in the US, with 96.5% of the populace. It was the most Bahamian place in the United States, as well as having the highest percentage of British West Indians in the US, at 1.8% (which tied with Brentwood, Maryland.) It was also home to the fifty-third highest percentage of Haitians in the US, at 2.8% of all residents (which also tied with Sunrise, Florida; Lake Alfred, Florida; and Brentwood, New York).

== Education ==
Miami-Dade County Public Schools operates public schools. Schools in the former CDP:

- North Dade Middle School
- Bunche Park Elementary School
- North Dade Center for Modern Language
- Bunche Park Senior High School (2002-2020)
