= Opa-locka North, Florida =

Opa-locka North
- Neighborhood of Miami Gardens
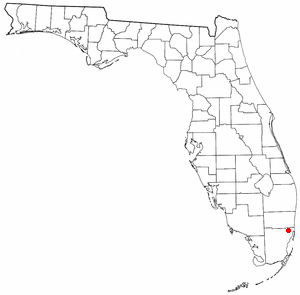
- Location in the state of Florida
- Coordinates: 25°55′16″N 80°15′46″W
- Country: United States
- State: Florida
- County: Miami-Dade
- City: Miami Gardens

Area
  - Total: 2.3 sq mi (5.9 km^{2})
  - Land: 2.2 sq mi (5.6 km^{2})
  - Water: 0.12 sq mi (0.3 km^{2})

Population (2000)
  - Total: 6,224
  - Density: 2,863/sq mi (1,105.5/km^{2})
- Time zone: UTC-5 (Eastern (EST))
  - Summer (DST): UTC-4 (EDT)
- ZIP code: 33054
- FIPS code: 12-51662

Opa-locka North is a neighborhood in Miami Gardens, Florida, United States. It was formerly a census-designated place. The population was 6,224 at the 2000 census.

== Geography ==
Opa-locka North is located at 25°55′16″N 80°15′46″W (25.921121, -80.262795).

According to the United States Census Bureau, the CDP has a total area of 5.9 km^{2} (2.3 sq mi). 5.6 km^{2} (2.2 sq mi) of it is land and 0.3 km^{2} (0.12 sq mi) of it (4.80%) is water.

== Demographics ==
Historical population
Census	Pop.	Note	%±
1980	5,721		—
1990	6,568		14.8%
2000	6,224		−5.2%
U.S. Decennial Census; 1990 2000

Opa-locka North CDP, Florida – Racial and ethnic composition Note: the US Census treats Hispanic/Latino as an ethnic category. This table excludes Latinos from the racial categories and assigns them to a separate category. Hispanics/Latinos may be of any race.
Race / Ethnicity (NH = Non-Hispanic)	Pop 2000	% 2000
White alone (NH)	343	5.51%
Black or African American alone (NH)	4,568	73.39%
Native American or Alaska Native alone (NH)	7	0.11%
Asian alone (NH)	29	0.47%
Native Hawaiian or Pacific Islander alone (NH)	2	0.03%
Other race alone (NH)	10	0.16%
Mixed race or Multiracial (NH)	76	1.22%
Hispanic or Latino (any race)	1,189	19.10%
Total	6,224	100.00%

As of the census of 2000, there were 6,224 people, 1,502 households, and 1,264 families residing in the CDP. The population density was 1,107.4 people/km^{2} (2,868 people/mi^{2}). There were 1,588 housing units at an average density of 282.5 units/km^{2} (732 units/mi^{2}). The racial makeup of the CDP was 20.07% White (5.5% were Non-Hispanic White,) 74.98% African American, 0.16% Native American, 0.47% Asian, 0.03% Pacific Islander, 1.83% from other races, and 2.46% from two or more races. Hispanic or Latino of any race were 19.10% of the population.

There were 1,502 households, out of which 41.5% had children under the age of 18 living with them, 44.2% were married couples living together, 31.9% had a female householder with no husband present, and 15.8% were non-families. 11.5% of all households were made up of individuals, and 2.7% had someone living alone who was 65 years of age or older. The average household size was 3.58 and the average family size was 3.79.

In the CDP, the population was spread out, with 28.0% under the age of 18, 21.5% from 18 to 24, 25.4% from 25 to 44, 18.5% from 45 to 64, and 6.6% who were 65 years of age or older. The median age was 25 years. For every 100 females, there were 90.3 males. For every 100 females age 18 and over, there were 83.9 males.

The median income for a household in the CDP was $35,618, and the median income for a family was $32,283. Males had a median income of $25,777 versus $21,112 for females. The per capita income for the CDP was $10,780. About 17.2% of families and 19.9% of the population were below the poverty line, including 23.5% of those under age 18 and 19.1% of those age 65 or over.

As of 2000, before being annexed to Miami Gardens, English as a first language accounted for 75.24% of all residents, while Spanish was spoken by 21.04%, French Creole was at 3.27%, and Jamaican Creole as a mother tongue made up 0.44% of the population.

== Education ==
Miami-Dade County Public Schools operates area public schools. Golden Glades Elementary School is in the former CDP. Jann Mann Educational Center, an alternative middle and high school, is also in the former CDP.

Monsignor Edward Pace High School is in the former CDP.

Florida Memorial University (previously Florida Memorial College) is in the former CDP, as is the SEED Foundation Miami School, on the FMU campus. St. Thomas University is also in the former CDP.
