= Norland, Florida =

Norland
- Neighborhood of Miami Gardens
- Interactive map of Norland
- Coordinates: 25°56′49″N 80°12′39″W
- Country: United States
- State: Florida
- County: Miami-Dade
- City: Miami Gardens

Area
  - Total: 3.7 sq mi (9.5 km^{2})
  - Land: 3.6 sq mi (9.4 km^{2})
  - Water: 0.039 sq mi (0.1 km^{2})

Population (2000)
  - Total: 22,995
  - Density: 6,369/sq mi (2,459.2/km^{2})
- Time zone: UTC-5 (Eastern (EST))
  - Summer (DST): UTC-4 (EDT)
- ZIP code: 33169
- FIPS code: 12-49000

Norland, also known as Norwood, is a neighborhood located in Miami Gardens, Florida, United States. The population was 22,995 at the 2000 census. In 2003 the majority of this CDP was incorporated into the city of Miami Gardens, and it now serves as one of the city's neighborhoods. Norland is a predominantly black neighborhood of African-American and Afro-Caribbean and has an estimated population of 23,500.

Norland has a significant population of Afro-Caribbbean, widely referred to as “Little Jamaica”. It has one of the largest concentrations of Jamaican communities in Florida, which holds restaurants and Jamaican -owned businesses.

== Geography ==
Norland is located at 25°56′49″N 80°12′39″W (25.947070, -80.210939).

According to the United States Census Bureau, the CDP has a total area of 9.5 km^{2} (3.7 sq mi). 9.3 km^{2} (3.6 sq mi) of it is land and 0.1 km^{2} (0.039 sq mi) of it (1.10%) is water.

== Demographics ==
Historical population
Census	Pop.	Note	%±
1970	14,973		—
1980	19,471		30.0%
1990	22,109		13.5%
2000	22,995		4.0%
U.S. Decennial Census; 1990 2000; Census area returned as Norwood 1970.

=== 2000 census ===
Norland CDP, Florida – Racial and ethnic composition Note: the US Census treats Hispanic/Latino as an ethnic category. This table excludes Latinos from the racial categories and assigns them to a separate category. Hispanics/Latinos may be of any race.
Race / Ethnicity (NH = Non-Hispanic)	Pop 2000	% 2000
White alone (NH)	1,764	7.67%
Black or African American alone (NH)	17,916	77.91%
Native American or Alaska Native alone (NH)	20	0.09%
Asian alone (NH)	240	1.04%
Native Hawaiian or Pacific Islander alone (NH)	1	0.00%
Other race alone (NH)	65	0.28%
Mixed race or Multiracial (NH)	704	3.06%
Hispanic or Latino (any race)	2,285	9.94%
Total	22,995	100.00%

As of the census of 2000, there were 22,995 people, 6,966 households, and 5,315 families residing in the CDP. The population density was 2,459.4 people/km^{2} (6,370 people/mi^{2}). There were 7,399 housing units at an average density of 791.3 units/km^{2} (2,049 units/mi^{2}). The racial makeup of the CDP was 13.00% White (7.7% were Non-Hispanic White,) 79.52% African American, 0.15% Native American, 1.08% Asian, 2.18% from other races, and 4.07% from two or more races. Hispanic or Latino of any race were 9.94% of the population.

There were 6,966 households, out of which 44.3% had children under the age of 18 living with them, 40.6% were married couples living together, 28.0% had a female householder with no husband present, and 23.7% were non-families. 19.7% of all households were made up of individuals, and 6.6% had someone living alone who was 65 years of age or older. The average household size was 3.24 and the average family size was 3.68.

In the CDP, the population was spread out, with 32.1% under the age of 18, 10.6% from 18 to 24, 28.3% from 25 to 44, 19.7% from 45 to 64, and 9.3% who were 65 years of age or older. The median age was 30 years. For every 100 females, there were 85.1 males. For every 100 females age 18 and over, there were 78.8 males.

The median income for a household in the CDP was $36,242, and the median income for a family was $38,648. Males had a median income of $27,459 versus $24,350 for females. The per capita income for the CDP was $13,718. About 12.7% of families and 16.0% of the population were below the poverty line, including 19.6% of those under age 18 and 17.9% of those age 65 or over.

As of 2000, before being annexed to Miami Gardens, English as a first language was spoken by 74.87% of all residents, and French Creole accounted for 12.92%, Spanish was at 10.19%, and French as a mother tongue made up 1.02% of the population.

== Education ==
Miami-Dade County Public Schools operates area public schools. Schools in the former Norland CDP include:

Secondary

- Miami Norland High School
- Norland Middle School

Elementary

- Hibiscus Elementary School
- Norland Elementary School
- Norwood Elementary School
- Parkway Elementary School
