= Lake Lucerne, Florida =

Lake Lucerne
- Neighborhood of Miami Gardens
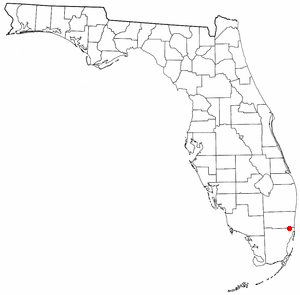
- Location in the state of Florida
- Coordinates: 25°57′56″N 80°15′14″W
- Country: United States
- State: Florida
- County: Miami-Dade
- City: Miami Gardens

Area
  - Total: 2.6 sq mi (6.8 km^{2})
  - Land: 2.6 sq mi (6.8 km^{2})
  - Water: 0 sq mi (0.0 km^{2})

Population (2000)
  - Total: 9,132
  - Density: 3,492/sq mi (1,348.4/km^{2})
- Time zone: UTC-5 (Eastern (EST))
  - Summer (DST): UTC-4 (EDT)
- ZIP code: 33056
- FIPS code: 12-38300

Lake Lucerne is a neighborhood in Miami Gardens, Florida. It is formerly a census-designated place. The population was 9,132 at the time of the 2000 United States census.

== Geography ==
Lake Lucerne is located at 25°57′56″N 80°15′14″W (25.965420, -80.253858).

According to the United States Census Bureau, the CDP has a total area of 6.8 km^{2} (2.6 sq mi). 6.8 km^{2} (2.6 sq mi) of it is land and 0.38% is water.

== Demographics ==
Historical population
Census	Pop.	Note	%±
1980	9,762		—
1990	9,478		−2.9%
2000	9,132		−3.7%

Lake Lucerne CDP, Florida – Racial and ethnic composition Note: the US Census treats Hispanic/Latino as an ethnic category. This table excludes Latinos from the racial categories and assigns them to a separate category. Hispanics/Latinos may be of any race.
Race / Ethnicity (NH = Non-Hispanic)	Pop 2000	% 2000
White alone (NH)	141	1.54%
Black or African American alone (NH)	7,509	82.23%
Native American or Alaska Native alone (NH)	11	0.12%
Asian alone (NH)	15	0.16%
Native Hawaiian or Pacific Islander alone (NH)	0	0.00%
Other race alone (NH)	13	0.14%
Mixed race or Multiracial (NH)	90	0.99%
Hispanic or Latino (any race)	1,353	14.82%
Total	9,132	100.00%

As of the census of 2000, there were 9,132 people, 2,631 households, and 2,117 families residing in the CDP. The population density was 1,350.9 people/km^{2} (3,499 people/mi^{2}). There were 2,835 housing units at an average density of 419.4 units/km^{2} (1,086 units/mi^{2}). The racial makeup of the CDP was 11.09% White (1.5% were Non-Hispanic White,) 83.75% African American, 0.19% Native American, 0.16% Asian, 0.01% Pacific Islander, 2.54% from other races, and 2.26% from two or more races. Hispanic or Latino of any race were 14.82% of the population.

There were 2,631 households, out of which 39.3% had children under the age of 18 living with them, 39.6% were married couples living together, 33.8% had a female householder with no husband present, and 19.5% were non-families. 15.0% of all households were made up of individuals, and 3.5% had someone living alone who was 65 years of age or older. The average household size was 3.47 and the average family size was 3.83.

In the CDP, the population was spread out, with 33.5% under the age of 18, 10.8% from 18 to 24, 28.0% from 25 to 44, 20.8% from 45 to 64, and 7.0% who were 65 years of age or older. The median age was 29 years. For every 100 females, there were 88.4 males. For every 100 females age 18 and over, there were 80.8 males.

The median income for a household in the CDP was $35,166, and the median income for a family was $37,027. Males had a median income of $25,281 versus $22,031 for females. The per capita income for the CDP was $13,482. About 15.8% of families and 16.5% of the population were below the poverty line, including 22.1% of those under age 18 and 17.7% of those age 65 or over.

As of 2000, before being annexed to Miami Gardens, English as a first language accounted for 82.27% of all residents, while Spanish accounted for 14.16%, French Creole was at 2.55%, and French as a mother tongue made up 1.00% of the population.

== Education ==
The Miami-Dade County Public Schools operate area public schools. Those in the former CDP include:

- North County K-8 Center
- Robert Renick Education Center (alternative)

== Religion ==
Antioch Mission Baptist Church of Miami Gardens is in the former CDP.

== Recreation ==
Calder Casino is in the former Lake Lucerne CDP.
