= Lad Lake =

Residential care center in Dousman, Wisconsin, U.S.

Coordinates: 43.014799°N 88.449576°W

- Formation: 1902
- Purpose: Treatment, education, and counseling for adolescent males
- Location: Dousman, Wisconsin
- Website: www.ladlake.org
- Formerly called: Wisconsin Home and Farm School

Lad Lake is a social service agency with programs for historically underserved youth in Dousman, Wisconsin, United States. Established in 1902 in Dousman, thirty miles west of Milwaukee, on 367 acres of land, the residential campus was originally known as the Wisconsin Home and Farm School.
