= Miami Gardens, Florida =

City in the United States

- City
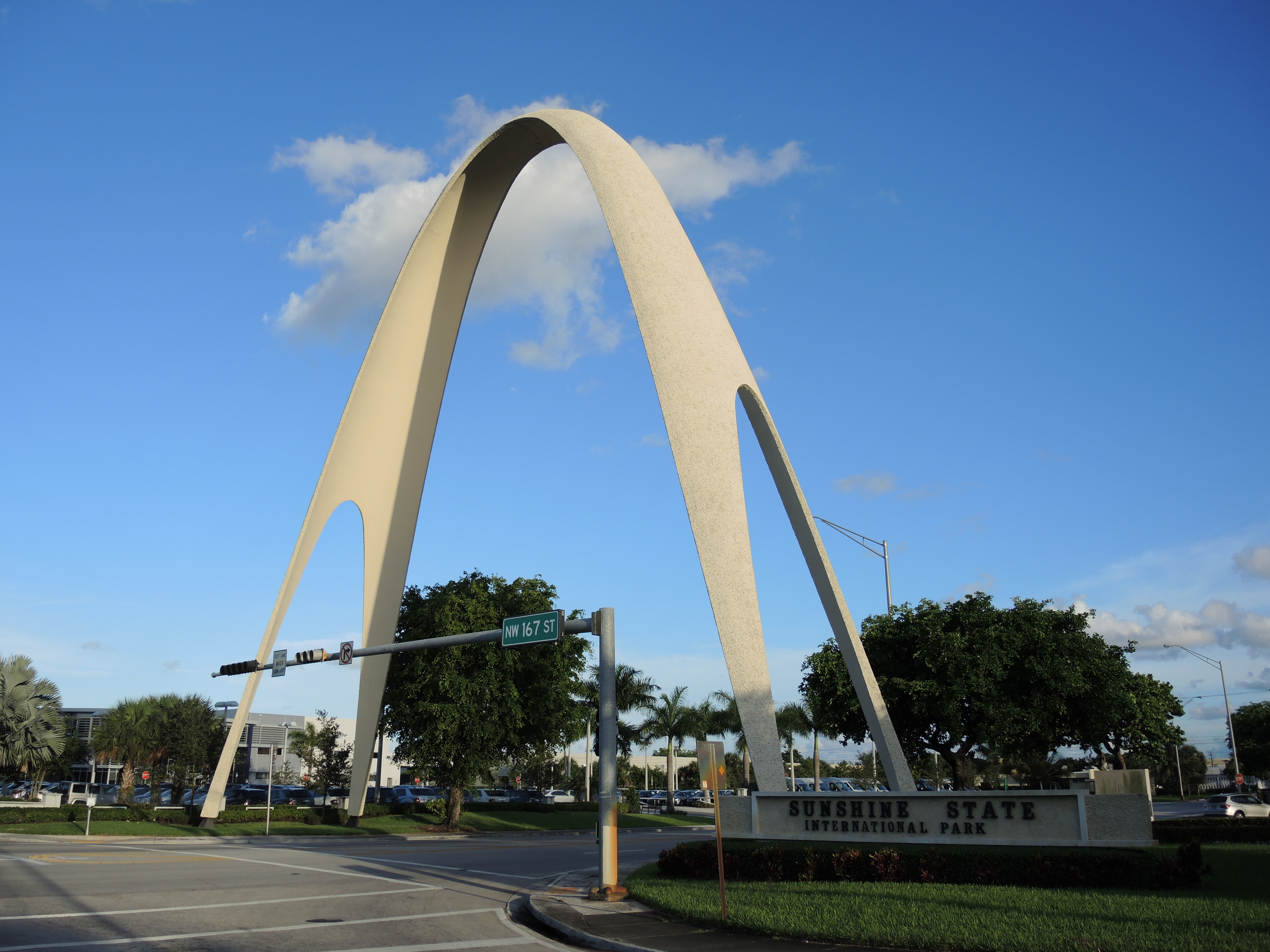
- The Sunshine State Arch of Miami Gardens

- Flag Seal
- Interactive map of Miami Gardens, Florida
- Location within Florida Location within the United States
- Coordinates: 25°56′31″N 80°15′23″W
- Country: United States
- State: Florida
- County: Miami-Dade
- Incorporated: May 13, 2003; 23 years ago

Government
  - Type: Council-Manager
  - Mayor: Rodney Harris

Area
  - City: 19.00 sq mi (49.21 km^{2})
  - Land: 18.23 sq mi (47.21 km^{2})
  - Water: 0.77 sq mi (2.00 km^{2})
- Elevation: 10 ft (3.0 m)

Population (2020)
  - City: 111,640
  - Density: 6,125/sq mi (2,365/km^{2})
  - Metro: 5,564,635
- Time zone: UTC−5 (EST)
  - Summer (DST): UTC−4 (EDT)
- ZIP codes: 33014, 33054, 33055, 33056, 33152, 33169
- Area codes: 305, 786, 645
- FIPS code: 12-45050
- GNIS feature ID: 2404249
- Website: miamigardens-fl.gov

Miami Gardens is a city in north-central Miami-Dade County, Florida, United States. It is a suburb of Miami and located 16 miles (26 km) north of downtown Miami with city boundaries that stretch from I-95 and Northeast 2nd Avenue to its east to Northwest 47th and Northwest 57th Avenues to its west, and from the Broward County line to its north to 151st Street to its south. The city's name originated from Florida State Road 860, a major roadway through the area also known as Miami Gardens Drive. It had a population of 111,640 as of 2020.

Miami Gardens is Florida's most populous city with a majority African American population and also home to the largest percentage of African Americans (66.97 percent) of any city in Florida, according to the U.S. Census Bureau. The city also has a significant Caribbean population, particularly residents of Jamaicans, Haitians and Bahamians, and is home to the largest population of Bahamians in the United States. It is a principal city in the Miami metropolitan area of South Florida, which is the nation's sixth-largest, and world's 65th-largest metropolitan area with a population of 6.158 million people as of 2020. Miami Gardens is the home of Hard Rock Stadium, a 64,767 capacity multi-purpose stadium that serves as the home field for both the Miami Dolphins of the National Football League and the Miami Hurricanes, the University of Miami's college football team.

== History ==
In the wake of the construction of I-95 in the late 1960s, many middle- and upper-income African American and West Indian American families migrated from Miami neighborhoods like Liberty City to what became Miami Gardens (also called Carol City, Norland, or Norwood) as race-based covenants were outlawed with the Fair Housing Act, and mostly lower income blacks moved into the Liberty City and Little Haiti neighborhoods surrounding Liberty Square and Edison Courts.

Miami Gardens was incorporated on May 13, 2003. The city's neighborhoods of Andover, Bunche Park, Carol City, Lake Lucerne, Norland, Opa-locka North, and Scott Lake were previously unincorporated areas within Miami-Dade County.

In 2007, Mayor Shirley Gibson said that the city would no longer allow any low-income housing developments; many residents blamed the developments for spreading crime and recreational drugs throughout the city. Around that time, the city's tax revenues dropped to the third-lowest in Miami-Dade County.

In 2012, Oliver Gilbert, only the second mayor the city has had, proposed forming a community redevelopment agency (CRA). CRAs are formed to remove "slum and blight", to improve the physical environment of the city and to combat the social and economic problems typical of slum areas. CRAs are funded with property tax increases, which funds are used, in part, to stimulate private investment in the rehabilitation of the community.

During the 2026 FIFA World Cup, Hard Rock Stadium hosted multiple matches during the tournament.

== Demographics ==
Historical population
Census	Pop.	Note	%±
1990	116,713		—
2000	124,656		6.8%
2010	107,167		−14.0%
2020	111,640		4.2%
U.S. Decennial Census; 2010 2020

The city was incorporated in 2003, but various parts of the city appeared as census designated places in the 2000 census and previous censuses. The community is made up of the neighborhoods (all former CDPs) of Andover, Bunche Park, Carol City, Lake Lucerne, Norland, Opa-locka North, and Scott Lake. The United States Census Bureau enumerated that the population of Miami Gardens was 111,640 per the 2020 census.

=== 2010 and 2020 census ===
Miami Gardens, Florida – Racial and ethnic composition Note: the US Census treats Hispanic/Latino as an ethnic category. This table excludes Latinos from the racial categories and assigns them to a separate category. Hispanics/Latinos may be of any race.
Race / Ethnicity (NH = Non-Hispanic)	Pop 2010	Pop 2020	% 2010	% 2020
White alone (NH)	2,806	2,742	2.62%	2.46%
Black or African American alone (NH)	78,629	69,071	73.37%	61.87%
Native American or Alaska Native alone (NH)	154	94	0.14%	0.08%
Asian alone (NH)	611	722	0.57%	0.65%
Pacific Islander or Native Hawaiian alone (NH)	27	11	0.03%	0.01%
Other race alone (NH)	190	646	0.18%	0.58%
Mixed race or Multiracial (NH)	1,144	1,643	1.07%	1.47%
Hispanic or Latino (any race)	23,606	36,711	22.03%	32.88%
Total	107,167	111,640	100.00%	100.00%

As of the 2020 United States census, there were 111,640 people, 30,946 households, and 23,158 families residing in the city.

As of 2016, the age distribution was 5.6% under the age of 5, 6.7% from 5 to 9, 6.5% from 10 to 14, 15.5% from 15 to 24, 14.6% from 25 to 34, 12.7% 35 to 44, 13.1% 45 to 54, 12.6% 55 to 64, and 12.7% who were 65 years of age or older. The population was 46.9% male and 53.1% female. Families made up 72% of households, while 28% were non-families. The average household size was 3.52 members, and the city covered 20 square miles (52 km^{2}).

As of the 2010 United States census, there were 107,167 people, 32,000 households, and 23,749 families residing in the city. In 2010, 6.0% of households were vacant.

==== Hispanic population ====
#	2010-2014 Hispanic population of Miami Gardens	Percentage
1	Cuban	43.94%
2	Central American	17.78%
3	Puerto Rican	11.96%
4	South American	8.25%
5	Mexican	3.06%

== Crime rates ==
According to City Rating, Miami Gardens crime statistics have decreased in the past 13 years. The crimes that have decreased the most are property crimes and violent crimes. The crime rate for Miami Gardens for 2018 is expected to be lower than in 2016. Miami Garden's 2016 violent crime rate was 63.64% higher than the national violent crime rate, and the property crime rate was 30.99% higher than the national property crime rate.

In 2016, Miami Gardens' violent crime rate was higher than that in Florida by 50.99%, and the property crime rate was 19.49% higher.

In 2016, there were 432 reported cases of aggravated assault, 22 reported cases of arson, 509 reported cases of burglary, 24 cases of forcible rape, 2,743 cases of larceny and theft, 419 reported cases of motor vehicle theft, 22 reported cases of murder and manslaughter, and 265 cases of robbery.

The projected 2018 crime data is as follows: 286 reported cases of aggravated assault, 26 reported cases of arson, 435 reported cases of burglary, 7 cases reported of forcible rape, 2,139 cases reported of larceny and theft, 205 cases reported of motor vehicle theft, 18 reported cases of murder and manslaughter, and 102 reported cases of robbery.

== Sports facilities ==
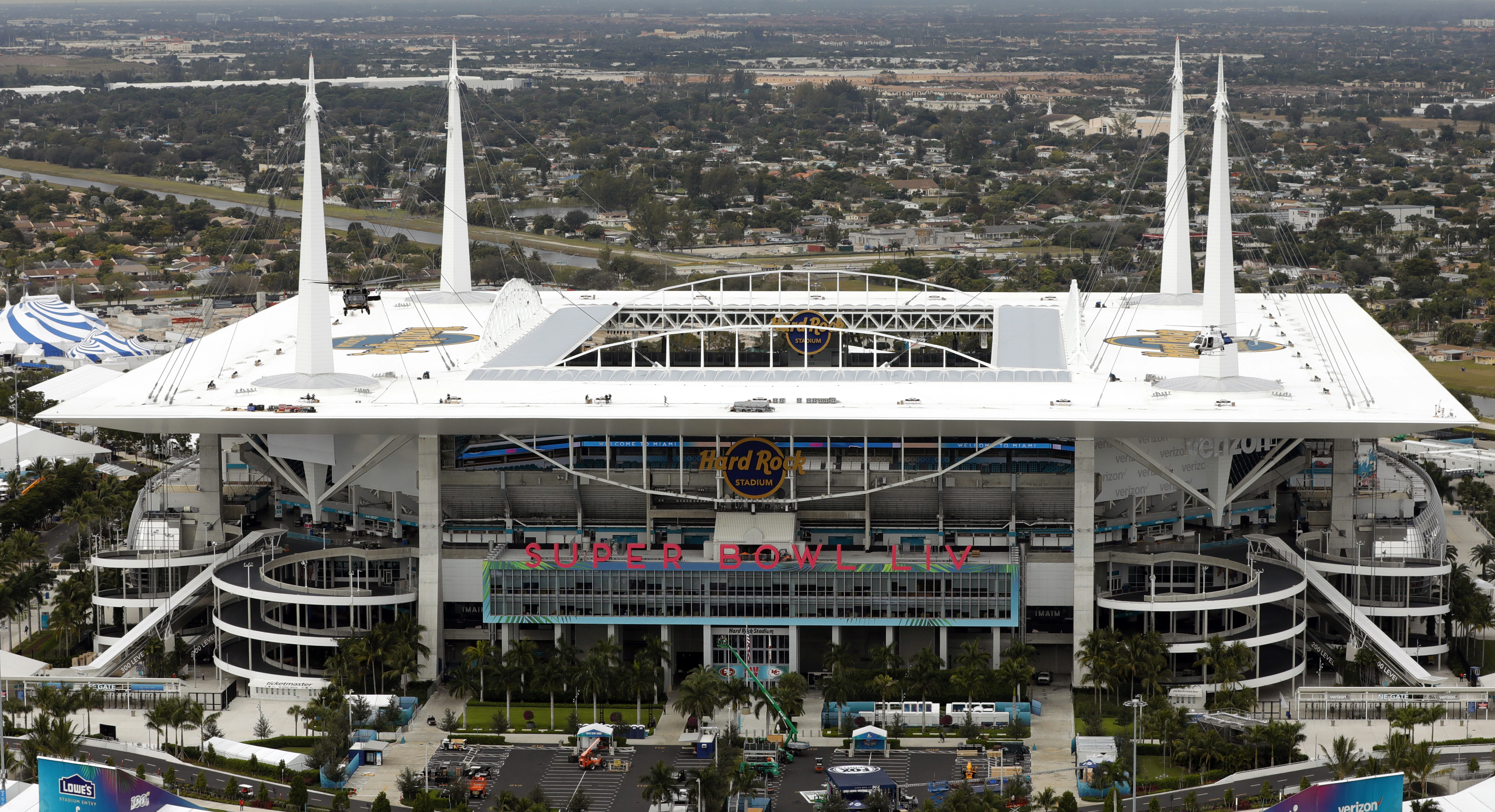
Hard Rock Stadium in Miami Gardens is the home field for both the Miami Dolphins of the National Football League and the Miami Hurricanes, the University of Miami's five-time national championship NCAA Division I college football team, January 2020

The Calder Race Course opened in 1971.

Miami Gardens is home to the Miami Dolphins, who play in Hard Rock Stadium on land that was part of the Lake Lucerne CDP. This stadium also hosts the annual Orange Bowl college football game, and is the home field for the University of Miami Hurricanes football team. The Miami Open tennis tournament is held on the grounds of the stadium. The Florida Marlins of Major League Baseball shared Hard Rock Stadium with the Dolphins for almost two decades until, in 2012, they relocated to Miami and changed their name to the Miami Marlins.

It has hosted the Miami Grand Prix, at the Miami International Autodrome, since 2022 for Formula One.

== Healthcare ==
The city of Miami Gardens has several health care clinics and facilities that offer medical care and support to its residents. Although the city has no hospital directly within its limits, Jackson North Medical Center, Concentra Urgent Care, and, Chen Medical Center provide medical services to the residents of Miami Gardens. Supplementing this, several health care clinics and facilities provide medical services that include general medicine, walk-in/urgent care, dental services, gynecology, physical therapy, chiropractor services, laboratory tests, x-rays, sonograms, osteoporosis screening, vaccinations, and health and exercise programs.

== Government ==
Miami Gardens is governed by a seven-member city council. Members include Mayor Rodney Harris (since 2020), and six council members, four elected from districts and two elected citywide. The mayor recommends – and the city council hires – the City Manager, City Attorney, and City Clerk.

These are 17 of the many departments for which the City Manager of Miami Gardens creates a budget.

#	Department	City Manager's Budget 2017–2018
1	Legislative Department	$969,411
2	Office of City Manager	$1,434,310
3	Office of City Manager Public Affairs Office	$3,922,843
4	Office of City Clerk	$450,730
5	Finance Department	$1,109,545
6	Human Resources Department	$1,076,395
7	Office of the City Attorney	$589,165
8	Planning and Zoning Office	$782,854
9	Public Safety Department Police Administration Division	$30,891,829
10	Public Safety Police School Crossing Guard Program Division	$483,407
11	Public Safety Department Police Investigations Division	$67,000
12	Public Safety Police Operations Division	$43,800
13	Public Safety Police Support Services Division	$265,003
14	Public Safety Cops Grant	$1,146,231
15	Public Safety Cops III	$1,190,853
15	Public Safety Cops IV	$1,050,309
16	Code Compliance Division	$1,441,100
17	Parks & Recreation Department Recreation Division	$2,268,224

=== Mayors ===
Image	Mayor	Years	Notes
	Shirley Gibson	2003–2012	
	Oliver G. Gilbert III	2012–2020	
	Rodney Harris	2020–Present	

=== Police ===
The Miami Gardens Police Department is the lead law enforcement agency for the 110,000 residents living within the city's 20 square miles (52 km^{2}). The department operates under a unified command structure with its headquarters located at 1020 NW 163 Drive, Miami Gardens, Florida 33169. The department became operational on Sunday, December 16, 2007, with 159 sworn officers. Since then, the department has grown to 259 members consisting of 201 sworn positions with 58 non-sworn support positions.

== Police incidents and concerns ==
In 2013, law enforcement abuses were alleged regarding the Miami Gardens Police Department by several news outlets. The abuses were first uncovered when it became public that a convenience store employee, Earl Sampson was arrested 27 times for trespassing, while working at and around the store at which he was employed. Video evidence was gathered by the owner of the store, Ali Saleh, showing Miami Garden police involved in clear and repeated misconduct involving his employee, and customers. According to the Miami Herald's Julie K. Brown: "The videos show, among other things, cops stopping citizens, questioning them, aggressively searching them and arresting them for trespassing when they have permission to be on the premises". It appeared Sampson had been arrested in this way due to police quotas, a department culture, and that Sampson was easy to arrest. Sampson always pleaded guilty so they would let him out almost immediately, with one exception where he pleaded not guilty, and he was jailed for 20 days. The guilty plea would validate the officers' improper arrest and increment their quota, so he became a continuous target.

=== Volume of stops ===
It was reported that, between 2008 and 2013, 99,980 stops occurred in Miami Gardens, involving 56,922 people, over half of the city's population. In the City of Miami, 3,753 stops occurred during the same period, with four times the population. Some stops involved children aged 5 to 7, totaling more than 1,000 children. These numbers were compiled after news regarding Earl Sampson.

=== Resignation and lawsuits ===
Following these reports, the police chief resigned. Civil rights lawsuits have been filed against the Miami Gardens Police Department by the store owner and others who were illegally detained and/or arrested. A police officer filed a lawsuit claiming that he had been fired for reporting abuses.

== Economy ==
In 2003, Miami Gardens based Merchandize Liquidators was founded.

== Education ==
=== Public schools ===
Miami-Dade County Public Schools operates area public schools.

#	Miami Gardens' elementary schools	2012 school grade
1	Brentwood Elementary School	C
2	Bunche Park Elementary School	A
3	Norwood Elementary School	B
4	North County Elementary School	C
5	Skyway Elementary School	C
6	Parkway Elementary School	C

#	Miami Gardens' middle schools	2012 school grade
1	North Dade Middle School	A
2	Lake Stevens Middle School	C
3	Parkway Middle School	D
4	Carol City Middle School	D

Norland Middle School, in the Miami Gardens area, has a magnet program in dance, music, theatre and art, which began in 1985. The young actors Alex R. Hibbert and Jaden Piner, who starred in the Oscar-winning film Moonlight, were trained at this school.

#	Miami Gardens' K–8 schools
1	North County K–8 Center

#	Miami Gardens' high schools	2012 school grade and graduation rates
1	Miami Carol City Senior High School	F, with a 62% graduation rate
2	Miami Norland Senior High School	B, with 89% graduation rate

=== Private schools ===
The Archdiocese of Miami operates area Catholic schools. Monsignor Edward Pace High School is in the Miami Gardens city limits. The archdiocese formerly operated Saint Monica School in Miami Gardens.

=== Colleges and universities ===
- St. Thomas University
- Florida Memorial University
- Sullivan and Cogliano Training Centers

=== Public libraries ===
Miami-Dade Public Library System operates the North Dade Regional Library, which opened in September 1979.

== Notable people ==
- Denzel Curry, rapper and songwriter
- Diamante, professional wrestler also known as "Angel Rose"
- Andre Johnson, retired professional NFL football player for Houston Texans
- Trayvon Martin, shooting victim of George Zimmerman
- Peter O’Brien, professional baseball player
- Jo Marie Payton, actress and singer
- Omar Jeffery Pineiro, rapper, songwriter and producer known by his stage name "Smokepurpp"
- Lil Pump, rapper and songwriter
- Flo Rida, rapper and songwriter
- Rick Ross, rapper and songwriter
- Earl Sampson, convenience store worker notable for being arrested 288 times in five years
- Jeremiah Smith, wide receiver for the Ohio State Buckeyes
- Frederica Wilson, U.S. representative and former Florida senator, Florida representative, and Miami-Dade County Public School Board member

== Surrounding areas ==
- Broward County (Miramar)
- Broward County (Miramar) Broward County (West Park)
- Country Club, Miami Lakes Ives Estates, Ojus, North Miami Beach, Unincorporated Miami-Dade County
- Miami Lakes Unincorporated Miami-Dade County
- Unincorporated Miami-Dade County, North Miami Beach
