= Florida's 20th congressional district =

U.S. House district for Florida

Coordinates: 26°30′32″N 80°40′38″W

- Map of district boundaries
- Representative: Vacant
- Area: 2,406 mi^{2} (6,230 km^{2})
- Distribution: 99% urban; 1% rural
- Population (2025): 806,342
- Median household income: $74,745
- Ethnicity: 49.1% Black; 23.5% Hispanic; 20.6% White; 3.3% Two or more races; 2.4% Asian; 1.1% other
- Cook PVI: D+20

Florida's 20th congressional district is a U.S. congressional district in Southeast Florida. It has been vacant since the resignation of U.S. representative Sheila Cherfilus-McCormick on April 21, 2026. With a Cook Partisan Voting Index (CPVI) rating of D+22, it is the most Democratic district in Florida.

The district includes most of the majority-Black precincts in and around western and central Broward County and small portion of southeastern Palm Beach County, including places like North Lauderdale, Fort Lauderdale, Lauderhill, Lauderdale Lakes, Tamarac, Lake Park, Riviera Beach, Plantation, along with parts of Pompano Beach, and Sunrise. It also includes a vast area inland to the southeastern shores of Lake Okeechobee, including the community of Belle Glade. The district also includes President Donald J. Trump International Airport. In the 2020 redistricting cycle, the city of Miramar was redrawn out of the district and into the 24th and 25th districts instead.

From 1993 to 2013, the 20th district took in parts of Broward and Miami-Dade counties. The district was based in Fort Lauderdale and included many of its suburbs including Davie. Most of that district is now the 23rd district, while the current 20th covers most of what was the 23rd district from 1993 to 2013.

== Recent election results from statewide races ==
Year	Office	Results
2008	President	Obama 79% - 20%
2010	Senate	Meek 48% - 20%
2010	Governor	Sink 78% - 22%
2010	Attorney General	Gelber 72% - 22%
2010	Chief Financial Officer	Ausley 68% - 25%
2012	President	Obama 81% - 19%
2012	Senate	Nelson 83% - 17%
2014	Governor	Crist 82% - 18%
2016	President	Clinton 77% - 20%
2016	Senate	Murphy 76% - 22%
2018	Senate	Nelson 80% - 20%
2018	Governor	Gillum 80% - 19%
2018	Attorney General	Shaw 78% - 20%
2018	Chief Financial Officer	Ring 80% - 20%
2020	President	Biden 76% - 24%
2022	Senate	Demings 71% - 28%
2022	Governor	Crist 69% - 30%
2022	Attorney General	Ayala 70% - 30%
2022	Chief Financial Officer	Hattersley 71% - 29%
2024	President	Harris 69% - 30%
2024	Senate	Mucarsel-Powell 70% - 28%

== Composition ==
For the 118th and successive Congresses (based on redistricting following the 2020 census), the district contains all or portions of the following counties and communities:

Broward County (15)

Boulevard Gardens, Deerfield Beach (part; also 23rd), Fort Lauderdale (part; also 23rd), Franklin Park, Lauderdale Lakes, Lauderhill, Margate (part; also 23rd), North Lauderdale, Oakland Park (part; also 23rd), Plantation (part; also 25th), Pompano Beach (part; also 23rd), Roosevelt Gardens, Sunrise, Tamarac, Washington Park

Palm Beach County (18)

The Acreage (part; also 21st), Belle Glade, Canal Point, Haverhill, Lake Belvedere Estates, Lake Harbor, Lake Park, Loxahatchee Groves, Mangonia Park, Pahokee, Plantation Mobile Home Park, Riviera Beach (also 21st), Royal Palm Beach, Royal Palm Estates, South Bay, Stacey Street, Westgate, West Palm Beach (part; also 21st and 22nd)

== List of members representing the district ==
Member	Party	Years	Cong ress	Electoral history	District location
District created January 3, 1993
Peter Deutsch (Fort Lauderdale)	Democratic	January 3, 1993 – January 3, 2005	103rd 104th 105th 106th 107th 108th	Elected in 1992. Re-elected in 1994. Re-elected in 1996. Re-elected in 1998. Re-elected in 2000. Re-elected in 2002. Retired to run for U.S. Senator.	1993–2003 [data missing]
Peter Deutsch (Fort Lauderdale)	Democratic	January 3, 1993 – January 3, 2005	103rd 104th 105th 106th 107th 108th	Elected in 1992. Re-elected in 1994. Re-elected in 1996. Re-elected in 1998. Re-elected in 2000. Re-elected in 2002. Retired to run for U.S. Senator.	2003–2013
Debbie Wasserman Schultz (Weston)	Democratic	January 3, 2005 – January 3, 2013	109th 110th 111th 112th	Elected in 2004. Re-elected in 2006. Re-elected in 2008. Re-elected in 2010. Redistricted to the 23rd district.	2003–2013
Alcee Hastings (Delray Beach)	Democratic	January 3, 2013 – April 6, 2021	113th 114th 115th 116th 117th	Redistricted from the 23rd district and re-elected in 2012. Re-elected in 2014. Re-elected in 2016. Re-elected in 2018. Re-elected in 2020. Died.	2013–2017
Alcee Hastings (Delray Beach)	Democratic	January 3, 2013 – April 6, 2021	113th 114th 115th 116th 117th	Redistricted from the 23rd district and re-elected in 2012. Re-elected in 2014. Re-elected in 2016. Re-elected in 2018. Re-elected in 2020. Died.	2017–2023
Vacant		April 6, 2021 – January 18, 2022	117th		2017–2023
Sheila Cherfilus-McCormick (Miramar)	Democratic	January 18, 2022 – April 21, 2026	117th 118th 119th	Elected to finish Hastings's term. Re-elected in 2022. Re-elected in 2024. Resigned.	2017–2023
Sheila Cherfilus-McCormick (Miramar)	Democratic	January 18, 2022 – April 21, 2026	117th 118th 119th	Elected to finish Hastings's term. Re-elected in 2022. Re-elected in 2024. Resigned.	2023–2027
Vacant		April 21, 2026 – present	119th		2023–2027
Debbie Wasserman Schultz (Weston)	Democratic	Assuming office on January 3, 2027		Redistricted from the 25th district and re-elected in 2026.	2023–2027

== Election results ==
=== 2002 ===
Florida's 20th Congressional District Election (2002)
Party	Candidate	Votes	%
Democratic	Peter Deutsch (Incumbent)	96,787	100
Total votes		96,787	100
Turnout			
Democratic hold			

=== 2004 ===
Florida's 20th Congressional District Election (2004)
Party	Candidate	Votes	%
Democratic	Debbie Wasserman Schultz	191,195	70
Republican	Margaret Hostetter	81,213	30
Total votes		200,408	100
Turnout			
Democratic hold			

=== 2006 ===
Florida's 20th Congressional District Election (2006)
Party	Candidate	Votes	%
Democratic	Debbie Wasserman Schultz (Incumbent)	124,554	100
Total votes		124,544	100
Turnout			
Democratic hold			

=== 2008 ===
Florida's 20th Congressional District Election (2008)
Party	Candidate	Votes	%
Democratic	Debbie Wasserman Schultz (Incumbent)	202,832	77
Independent	Margaret Hostetter	58,958	23
Total votes		261,790	100
Turnout			
Democratic hold			

=== 2010 ===
Florida's 20th Congressional District Election (2010)
Party	Candidate	Votes	%
Democratic	Debbie Wasserman Schultz (Incumbent)	100,787	60
Republican	Karen Harrington	63,845	38
Independent	Stanley Blumenthal	1,663	1
Independent	Bob Kunst	1,272	1
Total votes		167,567	100
Turnout			
Democratic hold			

=== 2012 ===
2012 United States House of Representatives elections in Florida
Party	Candidate	Votes	%
Democratic	Alcee Hastings	214,727	88
Independent	Randall Terry	29,553	12
Independent	Anthony M. Dutrow (write-in)	5	nil
Total votes		244,285	100
Democratic hold			

=== 2014 ===
2014 United States House of Representatives elections in Florida
Party	Candidate	Votes	%
Democratic	Alcee Hastings (incumbent)	128,498	82
Republican	Jay Bonner	28,968	18
Total votes		157,466	100
Democratic hold			

=== 2016 ===
2016 United States House of Representatives elections in Florida
Party	Candidate	Votes	%
Democratic	Alcee Hastings (incumbent)	222,914	80
Republican	Gary Stein	54,646	20
Total votes		277,560	100
Democratic hold			

=== 2018 ===
2018 United States House of Representatives elections in Florida
Party	Candidate	Votes	%
Democratic	Alcee Hastings (incumbent)	202,659	99.92
Independent	Jay Bonner (write-in)	165	0.08
Total votes		202,824	100
Democratic hold			

=== 2020 ===
2020 United States House of Representatives elections in Florida
Party	Candidate	Votes	%
Democratic	Alcee Hastings (incumbent)	253,661	79
Republican	Greg Musselwhite	68,748	21
Total votes		322,409	100
Democratic hold			

=== 2022 (special) ===
2022 Florida's 20th congressional district special election
Party	Candidate	Votes	%
Democratic	Sheila Cherfilus-McCormick	44,707	79
Republican	Jason Mariner	10,966	19
Libertarian	Mike ter Maat	395	1
Independent	Jim Flynn	265	nil
Independent	Lenny Serratore	262	nil
Total votes		56,595	100
Democratic hold			

=== 2022 (regular) ===
2022 United States House of Representatives elections in Florida
Party	Candidate	Votes	%
Democratic	Sheila Cherfilus-McCormick (incumbent)	136,215	72
Republican	Drew-Montez Clark	52,151	28
Total votes		188,366	100
Democratic hold			
