= Jamaican Americans =

Americans of Jamaican birth or descent

Jumiekan Amoerkan (Jamaican Patois)
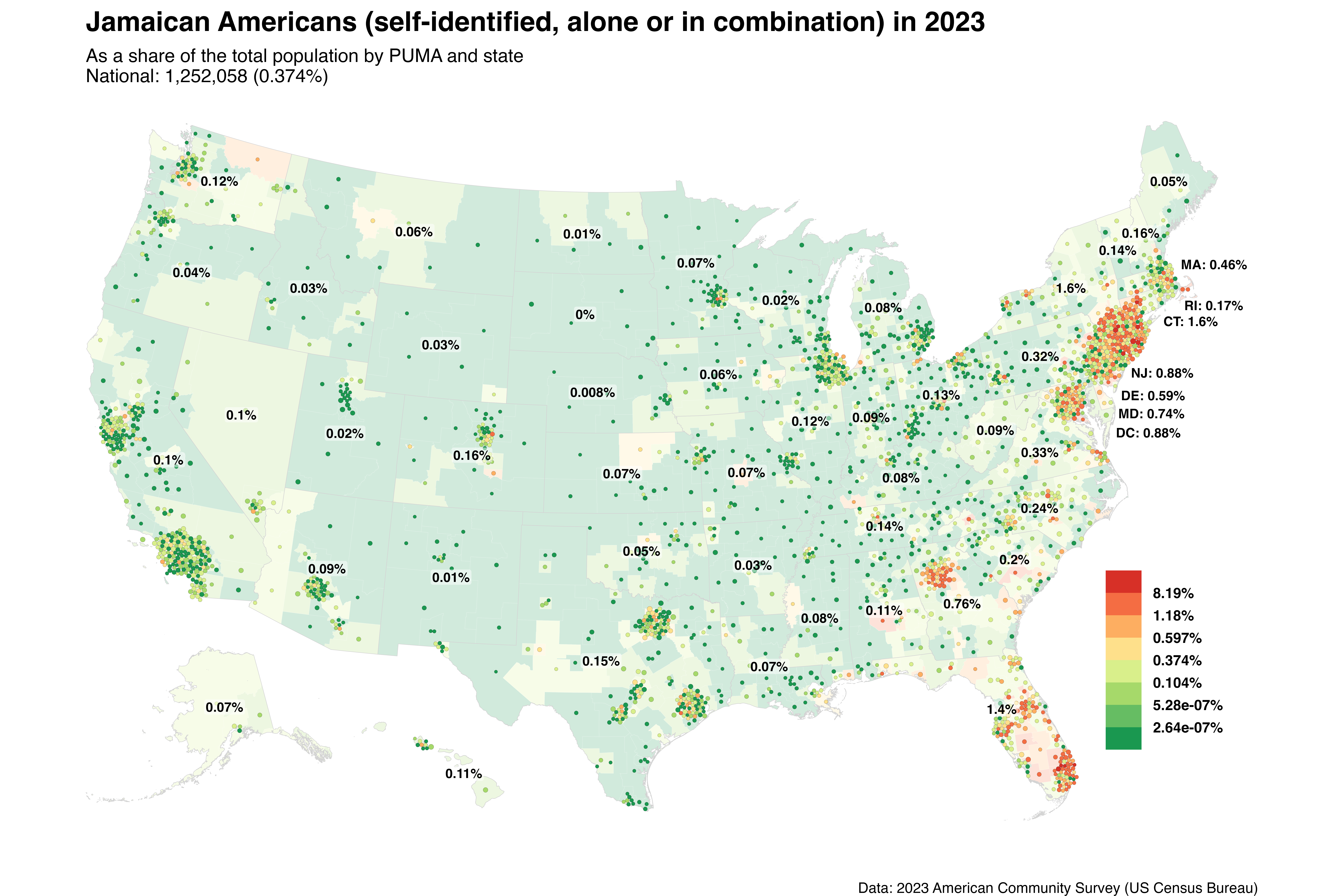

Total population
- 1,234,336 (2022); 0.37% of the U.S. population (2022)

Regions with significant populations
- Majority in New York, Pennsylvania, Connecticut, New Jersey, Maryland, Florida and Georgia; Smaller numbers in other parts of the country, including Massachusetts, Rhode Island, Ohio, Illinois, Wisconsin, Delaware, Virginia, North Carolina, Minnesota, Texas, Washington, Colorado, California, District of Columbia, Michigan and South Carolina

Languages
- English (American English, Jamaican English, African-American English, African-American Vernacular English), Jamaican Patois

Religion
- Predominantly Protestantism. Some adherents of Catholicism, Rastafari, and other faiths.

Related ethnic groups
- Caribbean Americans, British Jamaicans, Jamaican Canadians, Jamaican Australians, West Africans, Afro-Jamaicans, Indo-Jamaicans, European Jamaicans, Irish Jamaican, Scottish Jamaican, German Jamaican, Spanish Jamaicans, Chinese Jamaicans, Arab Jamaicans, Taíno, Jewish Jamaican, African Americans, Indo-Caribbean Americans, Indian Americans, South Asian Americans, Chinese Americans, Arab Americans, Jewish Americans, Hakka Americans, Creole, Dougla, Blasian

Jamaican Americans are an ethnic group of Caribbean Americans who have full or partial Jamaican ancestry. The 2020 United States census counted more than one million Jamaican Americans. The largest proportions of Jamaican Americans live in South Florida and New York City, both of which have been home to large Jamaican communities since the 1950s and the 1960s. There are also communities of Jamaican Americans residing in Massachusetts, Pennsylvania, Connecticut, New Jersey, Georgia, Maryland, and California.

The vast majority of Jamaican Americans are of Afro-Caribbean descent, although smaller numbers are of full or partial Indian, Chinese, European, Arab, Taíno, and Jewish descent.

Jamaican migration to the United States began in the 19th century and rose sharply during the 1960s. Jamaican Americans are represented in American music, sports, politics, and science.

== Historical immigration ==
After 1838, European colonies in the Caribbean with expanding sugar industries imported large numbers of immigrants to meet their acute labor shortage. Large numbers of Jamaicans were recruited to work in Panama and Costa Rica in the 1850s. After slavery was abolished in the United States in 1865, American planters imported temporary workers, called "swallow migrants", to harvest crops on an annual basis. These workers, many of them Jamaicans, returned to their countries after harvest. Between 1881 and the beginning of World War I, the United States recruited over 250,000 workers from the Caribbean, 90,000 of whom were Jamaicans, to work on the Panama Canal. During both world wars, the United States again recruited Jamaican men for service on various American bases in the region.

== Significant immigration waves ==
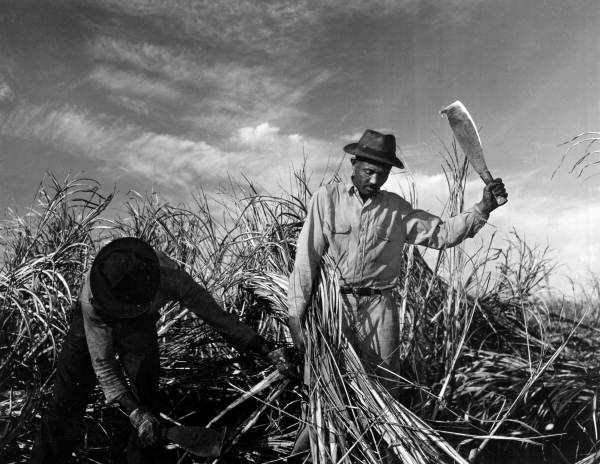
A Jamaican laborer cutting sugar cane in Clewiston, Florida, December 1947.

Jamaican immigration to the U.S. increased during the civil rights era of the 1960s. As with many other sources of Caribbean immigration, Jamaica's geographic proximity to the U.S. increased the likelihood of migration. The economic attractiveness and general Jamaican perception of the U.S. as a land of opportunity explain continued migration flows despite economic downturn in America. Traditionally, Jamaican immigrants came to the United States through family preference immigration categories, which allowed the U.S. citizens sponsor their immediate family. Through this category, many Jamaican immigrants were able to enter mainly urban cities within the U.S that provided blue-collar work opportunities. Jamaican immigrants utilized employment opportunities despite the discriminatory policies that affected some Caribbean émigrés.

Jamaicans comprise the largest nationality of U.S. immigrants from the English-speaking Caribbean. Because so many have assimilated into the black community, it is difficult to estimate their number. The 1990 U.S. census placed the number of documented Jamaican Americans at 435,025.

== Demographics ==
An estimated 554,897 Jamaican-born people lived in the U.S. in 2000. This represents 61% of the approximate 911,000 Americans of Jamaican ancestry. Many Jamaicans are second, third and descend from even older generations, as there have been Jamaicans in the U.S. as early as the early twentieth century. The regional composition is as follows: 59% live in the Northeast, mainly in New York; 4.8% in the Midwest; 30.6% in the South, particularly South Florida; and 5.6% on the West. The New York metropolitan area and South Florida have the largest number of Jamaican immigrants in the United States.

South Florida is home to the highest number of undocumented Jamaicans, whereas most documented immigrants tend to reside in Brooklyn. Jamaicans refer to Miami and Brooklyn colloquially as "Kingston 21" and "Little Jamaica" respectively. Jamaicans in the Miami metropolitan area mostly live in Broward County and Jamaicans in New York City have formed communities in Brooklyn, The Bronx and Queens. Especially Northern, Northwestern, Southern, Southwestern and Central Brooklyn, particularly Prospect Heights, Clinton Hill, Fort Greene, Bensonhurst, Gravesend, Park Slope, Flatbush, Brooklyn, Kensington, Midwood, Lefferts Gardens, East Flatbush, Crown Heights, Brooklyn, Bushwick, Bedford–Stuyvesant and Flatlands, parts of Eastern Brooklyn including Brownsville, East New York and especially Canarsie and the Northeast Bronx, particularly Wakefield and Williamsbridge neighborhoods holding the largest Jamaican populace.

Large communities of Jamaican immigrants have formed in New York City and the whole New York Metro Area, which includes Long Island and much of New Jersey and Connecticut, along with Florida (centered in and around the Miami/Broward County, Orlando and Tampa areas), which has the second largest Jamaican community in the U.S. In recent years, many Jamaicans have left New York City for its suburbs, and large Jamaican communities have also formed in many other major cities like Philadelphia (including Delaware and other parts of eastern Pennsylvania), Baltimore, Washington, D.C./Central Maryland, Atlanta, Boston, Western New York (Buffalo and Rochester) and Cleveland. Smaller numbers are in Chicago, Charlotte, Minneapolis, Houston, Denver, Seattle and Los Angeles.

=== U.S. states with large Jamaican populations ===
According to the 2020 U.S. Census, there were 1,047,117 Jamaican Americans. The 10 U.S. states with the largest Jamaican populations in 2020 census were:

1. New York – 284,228
2. Florida – 254,148
3. New Jersey – 61,949
4. Georgia – 60,091
5. Connecticut – 52,815
6. California – 37,264
7. Maryland – 35,953
8. Pennsylvania – 33,767
9. Texas – 29,100
10. Massachusetts – 29,099

=== U.S. metropolitan areas with largest Jamaican populations ===
The top U.S. metropolitan areas with the largest populations of Jamaicans (Source: 2023 American Community Survey 1-Year Estimates)

1. New York-Northern New Jersey-Long Island, NY-NJ-PA-CT MSA – 335,659
2. Miami-Fort Lauderdale-Pompano Beach, FL MSA – 181,591
3. Atlanta-Sandy Springs-Marietta, GA MSA – 71,133
4. Orlando-Kissimmee-Sanford, FL MSA – 44,705
5. Washington-Arlington-Alexandria, DC-VA-MD-WV MSA – 44,260
6. Philadelphia-Camden-Wilmington, PA-NJ-DE-MD MSA – 36,039
7. Hartford-East Hartford-Middletown, CT MSA – 28,764
8. Boston-Cambridge-Quincy, MA-NH MSA – 20,381
9. Houston-Pasadena-The Woodlands, TX Metro Area - 18,504
10. Tampa-St. Petersburg-Clearwater, FL MSA – 18,251
11. Chicago-Naperville-Elgin, IL-IN Metro Area - 17,377
12. Dallas-Fort Worth-Arlington, TX Metro Area - 15, 854
13. Baltimore, MD MSA - 15, 367
14. Los Angeles-Long Beach-Anaheim, CA Metro - 15,339
15. Bridgeport-Stamford-Norwalk, CT MSA – 13,698

=== U.S. communities with high percentages of people of Jamaican ancestry ===
The top 25 U.S. communities with the highest percentage of people claiming Jamaican ancestry are (2010):

1. Blue Hills, Connecticut (neighborhood) 23.9%
2. Lauderdale Lakes, Florida 18.8%
3. Lauderhill, Florida 17.6%
4. South Floral Park, New York 15.5%
5. Miramar, Florida 15.40%
6. Bloomfield, Connecticut and Mount Vernon, New York 12.9%
7. Lakeview, New York 12.7%
8. North Lauderdale, Florida 11.1%
9. Uniondale, New York 11.0%
10. El Portal, Florida 8.5%
11. Roosevelt, New York 8.2%
12. Pembroke Park, Florida 8.0%
13. North Valley Stream, New York and Hartford, Connecticut 7.90%
14. Sunrise, Florida 7.60%
15. Miami Gardens, Florida 6.3%
16. North Amityville, New York 6.1%
17. South Miami Heights, Florida 6.0%
18. Hempstead, New York and Elmont, New York 5.9%
19. Lake Park, Florida and Carol City, Florida 5.8%
20. East Orange, New Jersey, Gordon Heights, New York, Ives Estates, Florida and Golden Glades, Florida 5.7%
21. North Miami Beach, Florida 5.5%
22. New Cassel, New York 5.30%
23. Bronx, New York and Chillum, Maryland 5.2%
24. Pembroke Pines, Florida and Wheatley Heights, New York 5.1%
25. Bridgeport, Connecticut and Windsor, Connecticut 4.5%
26. Orange, New Jersey and South Bay, Florida 4.3%
27. Spring Valley, New York 4.2%
28. Goulds, Florida, Tamarac, Florida and Royal Palm Beach, Florida 4.1%
29. New Carrollton, Maryland, Plantation, Florida and Cottage City, Maryland 4%
30. Mangonia Park, Florida, Redan, Georgia and Somerset, New Jersey 3.9%
31. Brooklyn, New York, Naranja, Florida and Stone Mountain, Georgia 3.8%
32. Mount Rainier, Maryland, Adelphi, Maryland, Pine Hills, Florida, Baldwin, New York and Poinciana, Florida 3.7%
33. Westbury, New York and Inwood, New York 3.6%
34. Paterson, New Jersey and Brentwood, Maryland 3.5%
35. Teaneck, New Jersey 3.4%
36. North Miami, Florida and Plainfield, New Jersey 3.3%
37. Richmond West, Florida 3.2%
38. Haverhill, Florida 3.1%
39. Opa-Locka, Florida and Margate, Florida 3%

=== U.S. communities with the most residents born in Jamaica ===
Top 50 U.S. communities with the most residents born in Jamaica are (2010):

1. Sunrise, FL 19.6%
2. Norland, FL 18.5%
3. Blue Hills, CT 18.3%
4. Lauderdale Lakes, FL 16.9%
5. Andover, FL 15.0%
6. Lauderhill, FL 14.8%
7. Utopia, FL 13.1%
8. Palmetto Estates, FL 12.6%
9. Miramar, FL 12.5%
10. Scott Lake, FL 12.3%
11. South Floral Park, NY 12.1%
12. Mount Vernon, NY 11.2%
13. Bloomfield, CT 11.1%
14. North Lauderdale, FL 9.7%
15. Fort Devens, MA 9.3%
16. Northwest Dade, FL 8.5%
17. Uniondale, NY 8.2%
18. St. George, FL 8.1%
19. East Garden City, NY 7.7%
20. El Portal, FL 7.5%
21. Silver Springs Shores, FL 7.5%
22. Washington Park, FL 7.2%
23. North Valley Stream, NY 6.7%
24. Sunrise, FL 6.6%
25. Harlem, FL 6.4%
26. Lakeview, NY 6.2%
27. Opa-locka North, FL 6.1%
28. Hartford, CT 6.0%
29. Roosevelt, NY 5.9%
30. Westview, FL 5.7%
31. Tangelo Park, FL 5.5%
32. Miami Gardens, Broward County, FL 5.5%
33. Pembroke Park, FL 5.3%
34. Lake Park, FL 5.2%
35. Ives Estates, FL 5.1%
36. North Amityville, NY 5.1%
37. Canal Point, FL 5.1%
38. Rock Island, FL 5.1%
39. Boulevard Gardens, FL 5.0%
40. North Miami Beach, FL 5.0%
41. Lake Lucerne, FL 4.9%
42. Golden Glades, FL 4.9%
43. Broadview-Pompano Park, FL 4.8%
44. Carol City, FL 4.7%
45. East Orange, NJ 4.7%
46. Pembroke Pines, FL 4.4%
47. Stacy Street, FL 4.3%
48. Mangonia Park, FL 4.3%
49. Three Lakes, FL 4.2%
50. Elmont, NY 4.2%

Total immigrant population from Jamaica according to ACS 2015–2019 estimates: 741,400; the top counties were:

1) Broward County, Florida ------------------- 86,600

2) Brooklyn Borough, New York ----------- 62,200

3) Bronx Borough, New York ---------------- 49,400

4) Queens Borough, New York ------------- 49,000

5) Palm Beach County, Florida ------------- 26,900

6) Miami-Dade County, Florida ------------- 23,400

7) Westchester County, New York ------- 18,200

8) Hartford County, Connecticut ---------- 17,100

9) Orange County, Florida -------------------- 16,900

10) Nassau County, New York -------------- 16,600

11) Essex County, New Jersey ------------- 12,500

12) Fairfield County, Connecticut --------- 12,100

13) Prince George's Co., Maryland ------- 11,100

14) Philadelphia County, Penn. ------------ 10,100

15) Dekalb County, Georgia ------------------- 9,900

16) Suffolk County, Massachusetts ------- 8,200

17) Gwinnett County, Georgia ---------------- 7,500

18) Hillsborough County, Florida ------------ 7,300

19) Saint Lucie County, Florida -------------- 7,000

20) Suffolk County, New York ---------------- 6,800

21) New Haven County, Connecticut ------ 6,400

22) Los Angeles County, California ------- 5,900

23) Cook County, Illinois ------------------------ 5,700

24) Harris County, Texas ----------------------- 5,300

25) Bergen County, New Jersey ------------- 5,200

26) Manhattan Borough, New York -------- 5,100

27) Montgomery County, Maryland -------- 5,100

== Media ==
The media landscape for Jamaican Americans is limited in terms of dedicated platforms, with coverage concentrated in regions with a high density of Caribbean immigrants, such as New York, New Jersey, Hartford, Atlanta, Central Florida, and South Florida. These outlets serve as essential sources of news, culture, and community connection for the diaspora. However, the lack of tailored media options has led to increased reliance on platforms like WhatsApp, which can sometimes contribute to the spread of misinformation.

Several Jamaican-based media entities, including The Gleaner, Jamaica Observer, Loop News, and RJR News, often cover diaspora-related news and updates. However, their primary focus remains on events and issues within Jamaica and the broader Caribbean region.

Below is a selected list of Caribbean media platforms in the diaspora tailored to Jamaican-American audiences, featuring news, music, and cultural content. These platforms often focus on cultural preservation, community building, and political engagement, addressing the unique needs of Jamaican Americans and their descendants.

=== Radio ===
- WNTF (1580 AM): A Caribbean music station based in Bithlo, Florida, serving the Orlando area.
- The Voice of the Caribbean: A non-commercial station in South Florida broadcasting on 102.1 FM and 94.3 FM.
- The Caribbean Radio: An online Caribbean radio station streaming reggae, soca, and cultural news worldwide.
- Caribbean Affair Connection: Hosted by Lady D on WOKB 1680 AM in Central Florida, providing Caribbean music, news, and views.
- The Wayne Hall Show: Based in Atlanta, offering Jamaican and Caribbean music, news, and community-focused programming.
- Reggae Runnins on HOT 105 FM: Broadcast on WHQT, featuring reggae and Caribbean culture.

=== Online ===
- Jamaicans.com: A platform connecting the diaspora with cultural content, events, and news.
- South Florida Caribbean News: An online Caribbean news publication covering diaspora stories in South Florida and beyond.

=== Newspapers and magazines ===
- Caribbean Today: Florida's oldest Caribbean media house, providing diverse coverage of diaspora news and entertainment.
- Caribbean American Passport: A magazine based in Central Florida, celebrating the vibrancy of Caribbean-American culture.
- Caribbean Life: A publication owned and published by Schneps Media, offering diaspora news, features, and events.
- Island Origins: A lifestyle magazine that showcases Caribbean culture, food, and people while celebrating its influence in the diaspora, particularly in South Florida.

=== Community-based media ===
- Caribbean Affair Connection: A radio show hosted by Lady D on WOKB 1680 AM, Central Florida.
- The Wayne Hall Show: Offers a mix of Caribbean music, news, and community updates in Atlanta.

== Socioeconomics ==
=== Age and English proficiency ===
In 2014, the median age of Caribbean immigrants was 48 years, compared to 44 years for the general immigrant average. The median age of Jamaican immigrants was 49 years old. According to the Migration Policy Institute's tabulation of census data, 6% of Caribbean immigrants were under the age of 18, 76% between the ages of 18 and 64, and 19% were 65 and older.

In 2019, the median age of Jamaican Americans was 37 years old (U.S. Census Bureau 2019).

Caribbean immigrants are more likely to be proficient in English compared to the general immigrant population. In 2017, only 2% of Jamaicans were Limited English Proficient (LEP). By 2019, the figure had reduced to just 0.9% of Jamaicans who were LEP (U.S. Census Bureau 2019).

=== Education and employment ===
Caribbean immigrants perform better than the general immigrant population in terms of high school graduation rates.

In 2017, 24% of Jamaican immigrants had a bachelor's degree. This was higher than the Caribbean average of 21% (compared to 31% in the general immigrant population).

In 2019, 30% of Jamaican Americans had a bachelor's degree. This is higher than the American average of 24.3% (U.S. Census Bureau 2019).

76% of Jamaican immigrants are working age (18 to 64). An estimated 30% of Caribbean immigrants are in the service occupations, 21% are in sales and office positions, and 25% are in management, business, science, and arts occupations and only 9% of Jamaican immigrants are in construction and maintenance jobs. Jamaicans specifically, 32–37% seek management, business, science, and arts positions. According to the Migration Policy Institute, Jamaican immigrants to the United States consistently compose of a high share of skilled professionals. Caribbean immigrants tend to have a higher employment participation rate than the American average.

=== Income ===
In 2014, the median Jamaican immigrant yearly income was $51,000 with a 13% poverty rate. The median Jamaican immigrant income is higher than the average Caribbean immigrant income, which was about $41,000 with a 20% poverty rate. According to World Bank data, in 2014, the Caribbean as a whole was sent $9.7 billion, 8% of the US GDP as remittances, not including Cuba, which is estimated to send $1.8 billion.

In 2019, Jamaican Americans had a median household income of $62,044, higher than the American average of $57,761. Jamaican Americans had a poverty rate of 11.2%, lower than the American average of 12% (U.S. Census Bureau 2019).

=== Homeownership ===
Jamaican Americans have one of the highest rates of homeownership among Latin American and Caribbean immigrants in the US.

== Culture ==
=== Music ===
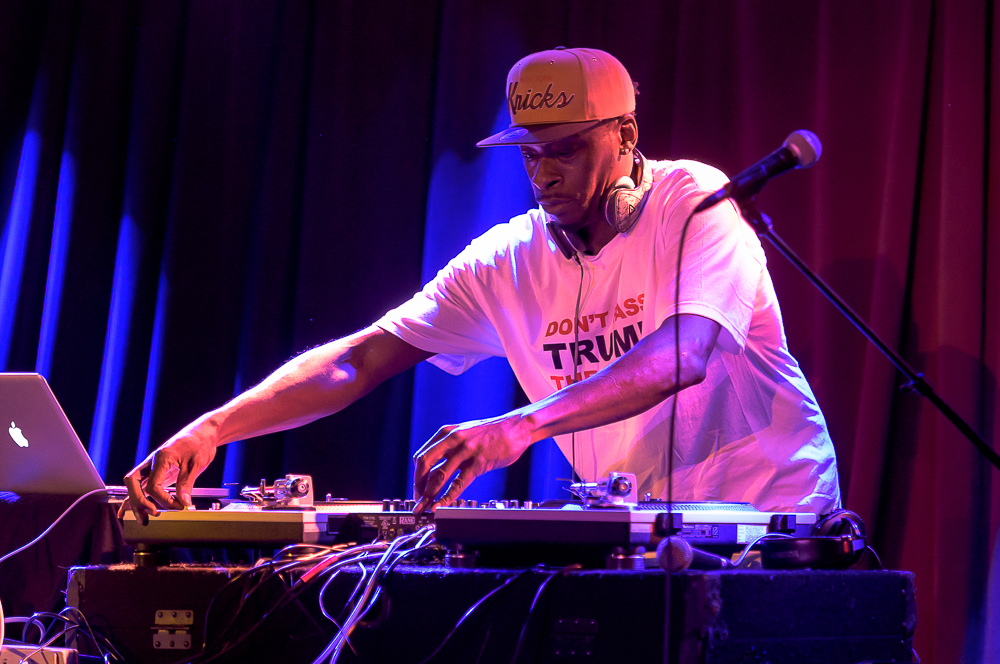
Pete Rock performing at Rahzel and Friends - Brooklyn Bowl, 2016.

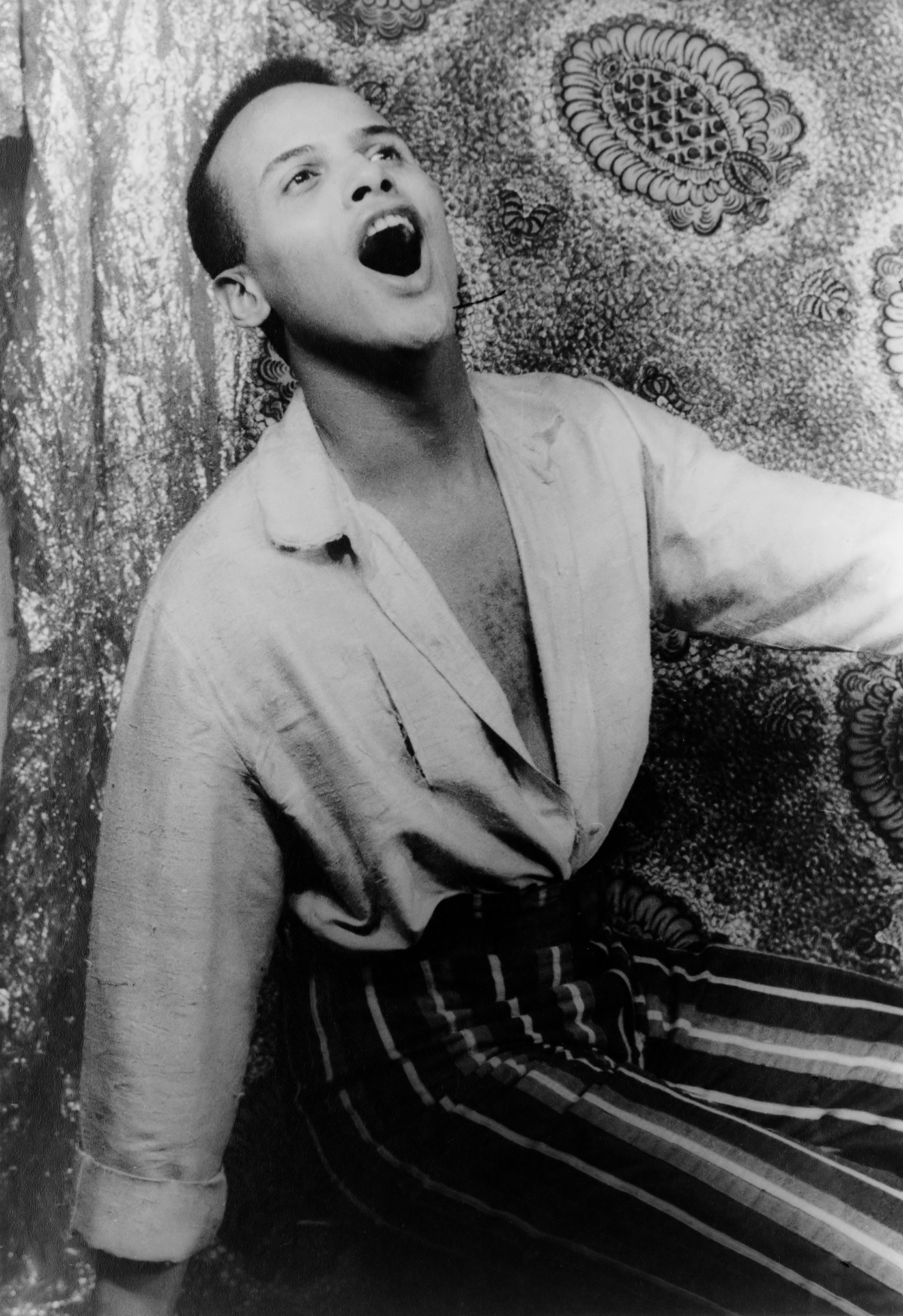
Harry Belafonte in John Murray Anderson's Almanac on Broadway, photographed by Carl Van Vechten, 1954

Many cultural events in Jamaica are also observed by Jamaican Americans in local public celebrations or in the privacy of their homes.

Many Jamaican Americans have also been very influential and successful in Hip hop music. DJ kool Herc is credited as being a pioneer in rap/hip hop music. Other famous rappers and DJ's such as Busta Rhymes, The Notorious B.I.G., Special Ed, Pete Rock, Canibus, Heavy D, Joey Bada$$, Slick Rick, and Bushwick Bill are all of Jamaican heritage.

=== Dances and songs ===
Jamaica's most popular musical forms are reggae and dancehall. There are also others such as "dub poetry" or chanted verses, Ska and Rocksteady, with its emotionally charged, celebrative beat. Jamaican Americans also listen to a great variety of other music such as: jazz, calypso, soca, rap, classical music, gospel and "high-church" choirs.

=== Actors ===
Notable Jamaican-American actors include Jada Pinkett Smith, Kerry Washington, Sheryl Lee Ralph and Harry Belafonte.

=== Cuisine ===
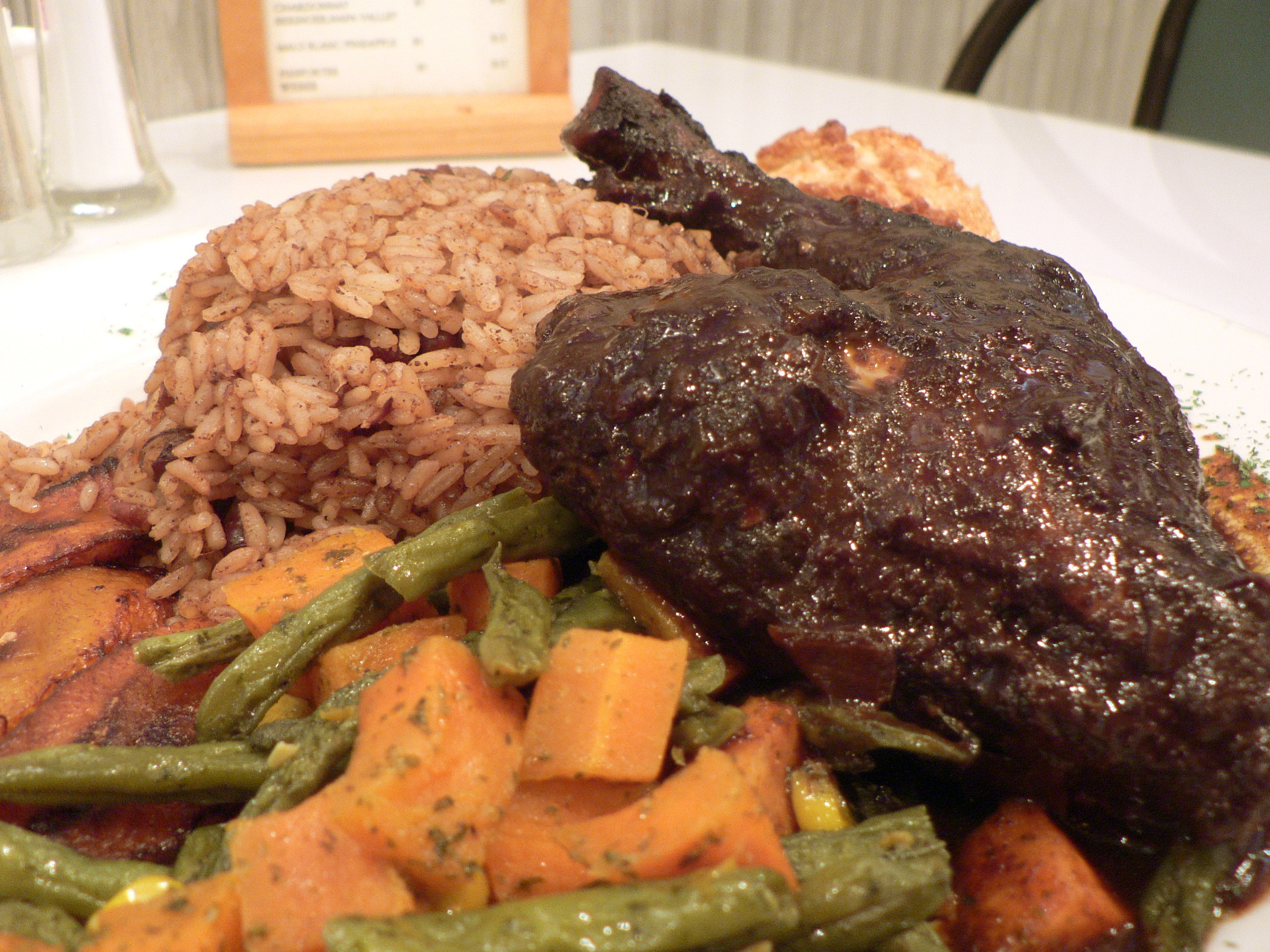
A plate of Jerk chicken.

In Miami and Brooklyn, especially in the neighborhood of Flatbush along Flatbush, Nostrand, Utica and Church Avenues, one sees groceries filled with a variety of Caribbean cuisines, including sugar cane, jelly, coconut and yams.

Numerous Americans link jerk seasoning to Jamaica, and jerk dry rubs along with jerk marinades can be found in most American grocery stores. The influx of American tourists to Jamaica has familiarized them with additional Jamaican products, including Jamaican Blue Mountain Coffee and ginger beer. A segment of health-conscious Americans has adopted Ital, a Rastafarian culinary tradition.

=== Traditional costumes ===
In New York City, Jamaican Americans participate in the Caribbean Labor day parade in Brooklyn annually and dress in colorful costumes during the Brooklyn celebration along Eastern Parkway.

There is also a Jamaican American flag representing their heritage in the United States. The flag is a blending of the American flag and the Jamaican flag. Many Jamaican Americans tend to fly solely the Jamaican flag.

=== Sports ===
A number of Jamaican Americans have won medals in international competition. Donald Quarrie won the 200 and the 4 × 100 meters relay Olympic Gold Medal. Merlene Ottey won the 200 and the 4 × 100 meters relay. George Headley, who was born in Panama in 1909, transported to Cuba, grew up in Jamaica. and lived in the United States. Sanya Richards-Ross won gold in the 400 metres after finishing third at the 2008 Summer Olympics. Richards-Ross has also won Olympic gold in the 4×400 meters relay at the 2004 Summer Olympics, the 2008 Summer Olympics, and the 2012 Summer Olympics. She was the best 400m runner in the world for a decade, ranking No. 1 in the world from 2005–2009 and again in 2012.

Several Jamaican-Americans, including Jeff Cunningham, Robin Fraser, and Mark Chung have played for the United States national soccer team.

There have also been many Jamaican-American NBA players including Patrick Ewing, Ben Gordon, Andre Drummond, Roy Hibbert, Andrew Kennedy, and Omari Johnson.

Notable Jamaican-American NFL football players includes Patrick Chung, Atari Bigby, Nevin Lawson, Orlando Franklin, Kenrick Ellis, Ryan McBean and Laken Tomlinson.

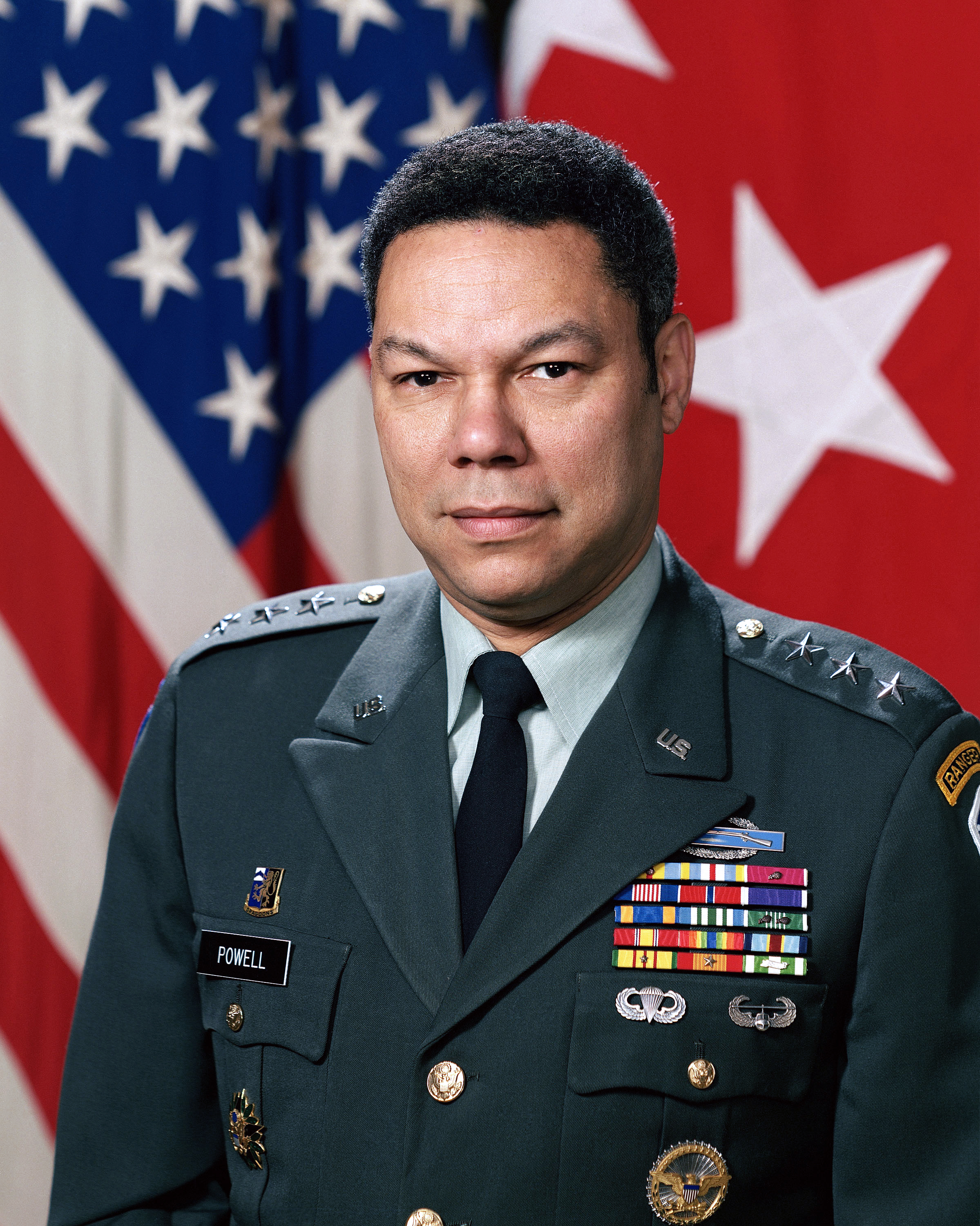
Colin Powell, the first African-American Secretary of State

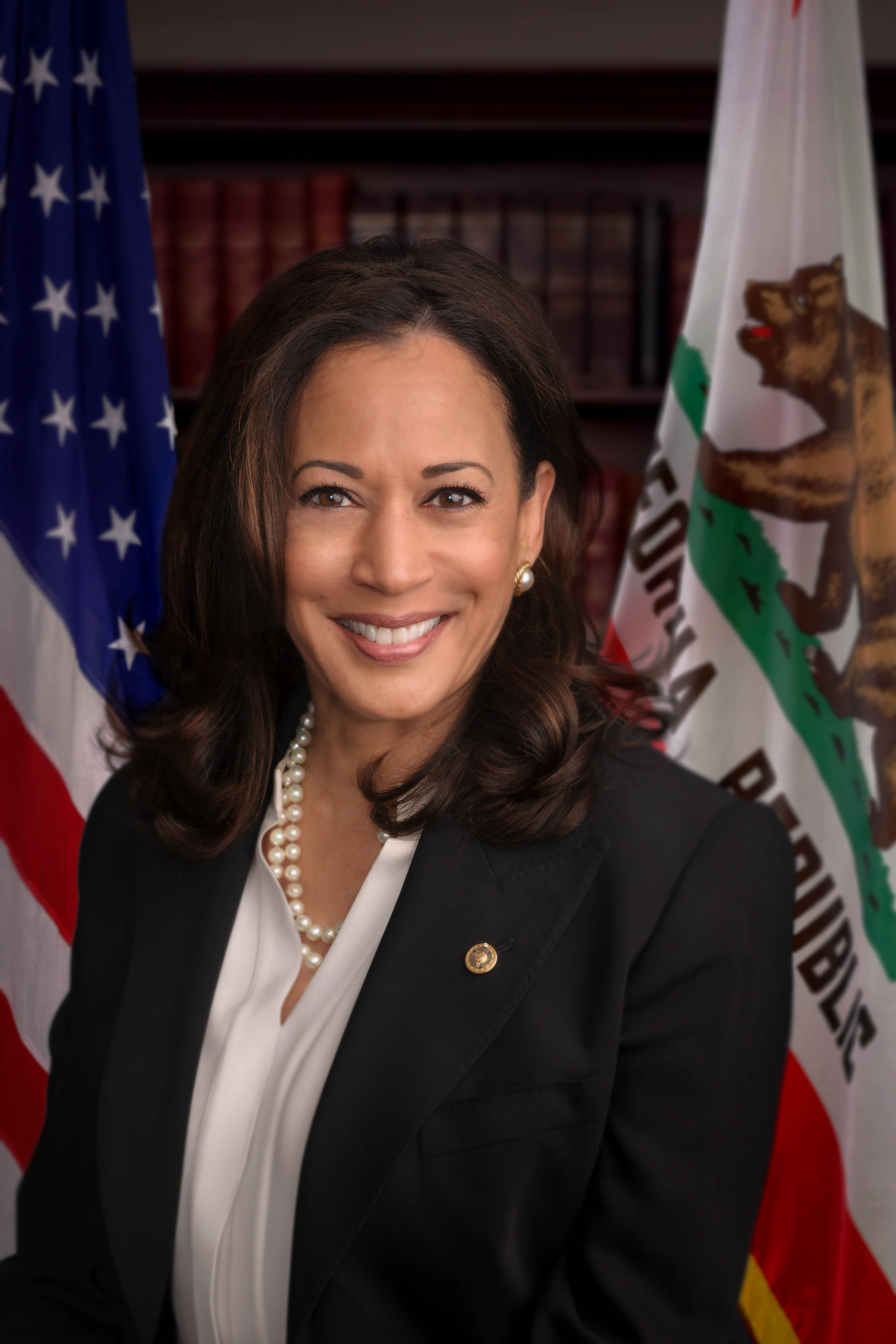
Kamala Harris, the first female vice president and the highest-ranking female official in U.S. history, as well as the first African-American vice president.

== Politics ==
Jamaicans have been involved in American political issues since the 1800s. John B. Russwurm fought against slavery and co-founded America's first black press, Freedom's Journal, in 1827. Ferdinand Smith co-founded the National Maritime Union and was considered one of the most powerful black labor leaders in U.S. history. Marcus Garvey became one of the most influential activists during the 1920s and 1930s and it was Garvey's ideas that influenced the views of American civil rights leader, Martin Luther King. Some academics and experts claim Garvey "helped paved the way" for the American civil rights movement.

Jamaican-Americans from this group include former Secretary of State and four star general Colin Powell, Vice President Kamala Harris, former National Security adviser Susan Rice, "Mother of the Pell Grant" Lois Rice, former Governor of New York David Paterson, and lieutenant governor of Virginia Winsome Sears.

== Science and technology ==
Walt W. Braithwaite helped transform the field of aerospace design, driving the development of computer-aided design/computer-aided manufacturing (CAD/CAM) systems at Boeing. Braithwaite also made a significant contribution to the development of the Initial Graphics Exchange Specification (IGES). Braithwaite's common data format and translators from Boeing were subsequently used as the basis for developing the IGES protocol.

Yvette Francis-McBarnette was a pediatrician who was the first to use prophylactic antibiotics in the treatment of children with sickle cell.

Christopher Huie, is a Virgin Galactic astronaut and Senior Engineering Manager, Flight Sciences. He successfully completed the Unity 25 space mission, and is also the co-founder of the Black Leaders in Aerospace Scholarship & Training (BLAST) Program.

Karen E. Nelson published the first ever comprehensive human microbiome study.

Paul S Ramphal is Adjunct Assistant Professor of Surgery at the University of North Carolina and inventor of the (Ramphal) Cardiac Surgery Simulator. The Ramphal Simulator is used in the training of many cardiothoracic surgery residents in the United States.

Robert Rashford co-invented the world's first portable 3D non-destructive evaluation (NDE) system. The system was used in the maintenance of the United States Government's Hubble Space Telescope. He also invented a protective enclosure for use transporting orbital replacement units (orus). Rashford designed and developed unique spacecraft support systems for the Upper Atmosphere Research Satellite (UARS) Airborne Support Equipment (UASE) at the Orbital Sciences Corporation (OSC). At General Electric, he designed and tested a variety of spacecraft for both commercial and military applications. At Bechtel Corporation, he designed a nuclear reactor support structure. He has designed numerous highly complex engineering systems that successfully flew on board NASA's Manned Space Flight Programs.

Mercedes Richards was a scientist who was the first astronomer to make images of the gravitational flow of gas between the stars in any interacting binary; the first to image the chromospheres and accretion disks in Algol binaries; the first in astronomy to apply the technique of tomography; the first astrophysicist to make theoretical hydrodynamic simulations of the Algol binary stars; the first astronomer to discover starspots on the cool star in an Algol binary and the first astrophysicist to apply novel distance correlation statistical methods to large astronomical databases.

John Henry Thompson, who studied and worked in the US, invented the Lingo programming language used in Adobe Director. The language is used for animation, web design, graphics, sound and video games.

== See also ==
- Jamaican Canadians
- Jamaican British
- Caribbean immigration to New York City
- Jamaica–United States relations
