= Haverhill, Florida =

Town in the state of Florida, United States

- Town
- Town of Haverhill
- Flag

- Location of Haverhill, Florida
- Coordinates: 26°41′27″N 80°07′27″W
- Country: United States
- State: Florida
- County: Palm Beach
- Founded: c. 1940s
- Incorporated: May 11, 1950
- Named for: Haverhill, Massachusetts

Government
  - Type: Council-Manager
  - Mayor: Jay G. Foy
  - Vice Mayor: Lawrence Gordon
  - Council Members: Mark C. Uptegraph, Dennis Withington, and Dr. Teresa Johnson
  - Town Administrator: Tracey L. Stevens
  - Town Clerk: Jean F. Wible

Area
  - Total: 0.63 sq mi (1.64 km^{2})
  - Land: 0.63 sq mi (1.64 km^{2})
  - Water: 0 sq mi (0.00 km^{2})
- Elevation: 16 ft (4.9 m)

Population (2020)
  - Total: 2,187
  - Density: 3,459.6/sq mi (1,335.74/km^{2})
- Time zone: UTC-5 (Eastern (EST))
  - Summer (DST): UTC-4 (EDT)
- ZIP codes: 33415, 33417
- Area codes: 561, 728
- FIPS code: 12-29200
- GNIS feature ID: 2405804
- Website: www.townofhaverhill-fl.gov

Haverhill is a town in Palm Beach County, Florida, United States. It is a part of the Miami metropolitan area of South Florida. The town is located in east-central Palm Beach County near the western periphery of President Donald J. Trump International Airport, and is also small geographically, encompassing just 0.63 square miles (1.6 km^{2}). The population of the town was 2,187 as of the 2020 US census.

== History ==
During the 1940s, the town's first permanent residents began building their homes when it was still a rural, South Florida flatwood pineland interspersed within the wetlands of the Everglades. By 1949, approximately 50 families living in the area began an effort to incorporate it into a town. The town was named after Haverhill, Massachusetts (which took its name from the English market town in Haverhill, Suffolk), because many of the first settlers were originally from that same town in Massachusetts. A vote on the motion to incorporate occurred on May 11, 1950. A total 59 out of 65 registered voters in Haverhill attended, who voted 42–17 in favor of incorporation. Ray Cox became the first mayor; other officers included Mrs. Fred Raulerson as town clerk, Tom Steele as town marshal, and Don Boyd, Henry Franklin, Paul Huffman, Myron V. Kelly, and A. J. Ward as town council members. The first census of the town, taken in 1960, recorded a population of 442. In the mid 1960s, construction began on a town hall, completed in August 1967 at a cost of $25,000. The town hall is a one-story building located at 4585 Charlotte Street near the eastern edge of the town. The town council is composed of five seats including the vice mayor and mayor.

== Geography ==
Although surrounded by unincorporated areas, Haverhill is located just west-northwest of President Donald J. Trump International Airport and borders the census-designated places of Lake Belvedere Estates, Royal Palm Estates, and Stacy Street.

The Town of Haverhill includes Haverhill Park, a county park located on 5470 Belvedere Road.

According to the United States Census Bureau, the town has a total area of 0.6 square miles (1.6 km^{2}), all land.

== Demographics ==
Historical population
Census	Pop.	Note	%±
1960	442		—
1970	1,034		133.9%
1980	1,249		20.8%
1990	1,058		−15.3%
2000	1,454		37.4%
2010	1,873		28.8%
2020	2,187		16.8%
U.S. Decennial Census

=== Racial and ethnic composition ===
Haverhill racial composition (Hispanics excluded from racial categories) (NH = Non-Hispanic)
Race	Pop 2010	Pop 2020	% 2010	% 2020
White (NH)	851	564	45.44%	25.79%
Black or African American (NH)	414	630	22.10%	28.81%
Native American or Alaska Native (NH)	5	1	0.27%	0.05%
Asian (NH)	33	59	1.76%	2.70%
Pacific Islander or Native Hawaiian (NH)	0	0	0.00%	0.00%
Some other race (NH)	4	16	0.21%	0.73%
Two or more races/Multiracial (NH)	19	68	1.01%	3.11%
Hispanic or Latino (any race)	547	849	29.20%	38.82%
Total	1,873	2,187		

=== 2020 census ===
As of the 2020 census, Haverhill had a population of 2,187. The median age was 37.9 years. 23.5% of residents were under the age of 18 and 12.5% of residents were 65 years of age or older. For every 100 females there were 94.9 males, and for every 100 females age 18 and over there were 93.5 males age 18 and over.

100.0% of residents lived in urban areas, while 0.0% lived in rural areas.

There were 712 households in Haverhill, of which 44.0% had children under the age of 18 living in them. Of all households, 51.5% were married-couple households, 16.7% were households with a male householder and no spouse or partner present, and 23.3% were households with a female householder and no spouse or partner present. About 14.9% of all households were made up of individuals and 5.4% had someone living alone who was 65 years of age or older.

There were 746 housing units, of which 4.6% were vacant. The homeowner vacancy rate was 1.7% and the rental vacancy rate was 4.6%.

According to the 2020 American Community Survey 5-year estimate, there were 570 families residing in the town.

=== 2010 census ===
As of the 2010 United States census, there were 1,873 people, 677 households, and 516 families residing in the town.

=== 2000 census ===
As of the census of 2000, there were 1,454 people, 537 households, and 392 families residing in the town. The population density was 2,534.7 inhabitants per square mile (978.7/km^{2}). There were 548 housing units at an average density of 955.3 per square mile (368.8/km^{2}). The racial makeup of the town was 78.95% White (64.9% were Non-Hispanic White), 12.38% African American, 0.21% Native American, 1.24% Asian, 0.21% Pacific Islander, 4.68% from other races, and 2.34% from two or more races. Hispanic or Latino of any race were 20.70% of the population.

As of 2000, there were 537 households, out of which 38.2% had children under the age of 18 living with them, 56.1% were married couples living together, 11.5% had a female householder with no husband present, and 27.0% were non-families. 19.6% of all households were made up of individuals, and 4.3% had someone living alone who was 65 years of age or older. The average household size was 2.71 and the average family size was 3.12.

In 2000, in the town, the population was spread out, with 26.3% under the age of 18, 6.7% from 18 to 24, 32.1% from 25 to 44, 24.8% from 45 to 64, and 10.2% who were 65 years of age or older. The median age was 37 years. For every 100 females, there were 101.4 males. For every 100 females age 18 and over, there were 99.3 males.

In 2000, the median income for a household in the town was $50,652, and the median income for a family was $53,167. Males had a median income of $31,100 versus $28,375 for females. The per capita income for the town was $24,503. About 6.3% of families and 8.3% of the population were below the poverty line, including 8.9% of those under age 18 and 7.0% of those age 65 or over.

As of 2000, speakers of English as a first language accounted for 77.93% of all residents, while Spanish as a mother tongue made up 22.06% of the population.

As of 2000, Haverhill had the fifty-eighth highest percentage of Cuban residents in the US, with 6.63% of the populace. It also had the forty-second highest percentage of Jamaican residents in the US, at 3.10% of the town's population.

== See also ==
- Golfview, Florida – a former town located just east of Haverhill
- Mounts Botanical Garden – a botanical garden located just outside the town's boundaries
