= Carver Ranches, West Park, Florida =

Carver Ranches, Florida
- neighborhood
- Interactive map of Carver Ranches, Florida
- Coordinates: 25°59′30″N 80°11′30″W
- Country: United States
- State: Florida
- County: Broward

Area
  - Total: 0.66 sq mi (1.7 km^{2})
  - Land: 0.66 sq mi (1.7 km^{2})
  - Water: 0 sq mi (0.0 km^{2})
- Elevation: 9.8 ft (3 m)

Population (2000)
  - Total: 4,299
  - Density: 6,380/sq mi (2,462/km^{2})
- Time zone: UTC-5 (Eastern (EST))
  - Summer (DST): UTC-4 (EDT)
- FIPS code: 12-10920
- GNIS feature ID: 0280101

Carver Ranches was a census-designated place (CDP) in Broward County, Florida, United States. The population was 4,299 at the 2000 census.

In 2005 it became one of four neighborhoods to incorporate into the new city of West Park.

== Geography ==
Carver Ranches is located at 25°59′30″N 80°11′30″W (25.991718, -80.191716).

According to the United States Census Bureau, the CDP has a total area of 1.7 km^{2} (0.66 sq mi), all land.

== Demographics ==
Historical population
Census	Pop.	Note	%±
1970	5,515		—
2000	4,299		—

A community named Carver Ranch Estates was listed as an unincorpoated place in the 1970 U.S. census. It was not listed in subsequesnt censuses until it was named as a census designated place in the 2000 U.S. census formed out of the deleted Miami Gardens-Utopia-Carver CDP. It was incorporated into the city of West Park prior to the 2010 U.S. census.

Carver Ranches CDP, Florida – Racial and ethnic composition Note: the US Census treats Hispanic/Latino as an ethnic category. This table excludes Latinos from the racial categories and assigns them to a separate category. Hispanics/Latinos may be of any race.
Race / Ethnicity (NH = Non-Hispanic)	Pop 2000	2000
White alone (NH)	62	1.44%
Black or African American alone (NH)	4,126	95.98%
Native American or Alaska Native alone (NH)	7	0.16%
Asian alone (NH)	1	0.02%
Native Hawaiian or Pacific Islander alone (NH)	0	0.00%
Other race alone (NH)	7	0.16%
Mixed race or Multiracial (NH)	25	0.58%
Hispanic or Latino (any race)	71	1.65%
Total	4,299	100.00%

As of the census of 2000, there were 4,299 people, 1,340 households, and 1,027 families residing in the CDP. The population density was 2,477.4 people/km^{2} (6,416 people/mi^{2}). There were 1,428 housing units at an average density of 822.9 units/km^{2} (2,131 units/mi^{2}). The racial makeup of the CDP was 2.19% White (1.4% were Non-Hispanic White,) 96.42% African American, 0.16% Native American, 0.02% Asian, 0.56% from other races, and 0.65% from two or more races. Hispanic or Latino of any race were 1.65% of the population.

There were 1,340 households, out of which 33.8% had children under the age of 18 living with them, 36.0% were married couples living together, 33.7% had a female householder with no husband present, and 23.3% were non-families. 18.5% of all households were made up of individuals, and 6.3% had someone living alone who was 65 years of age or older. The average household size was 3.20 and the average family size was 3.62.

In the CDP, the population was spread out, with 32.3% under the age of 18, 8.7% from 18 to 24, 28.1% from 25 to 44, 19.4% from 45 to 64, and 11.5% who were 65 years of age or older. The median age was 32 years. For every 100 females, there were 85.5 males. For every 100 females age 18 and over, there were 82.2 males.

The median income for a household in the CDP was $26,613, and the median income for a family was $27,412. Males had a median income of $22,604 versus $21,213 for females. The per capita income for the CDP was $10,090. About 25.6% of families and 25.3% of the population were below the poverty line, including 31.5% of those under age 18 and 36.4% of those age 65 or over.

As of 2000, before being annexed to West Park, English as a first language accounted for 96.90% of all residents, Spanish accounted for 2.19%, and French Creole for 0.90% of the population.
