= West Park, Florida =

- City
- City of West Park
- Flag
- Motto: "The City of Positive Progression"
- Location of West Park in Broward County, Florida
- Coordinates: 25°59′30″N 80°11′39″W
- Country: United States
- State: Florida
- County: Broward
- Incorporated: March 1, 2005

Government
  - Type: Council-Manager

Area
  - Total: 2.26 sq mi (5.86 km^{2})
  - Land: 2.20 sq mi (5.69 km^{2})
  - Water: 0.066 sq mi (0.17 km^{2}) 2.85%
- Elevation: 10 ft (3.0 m)

Population (2020)
  - Total: 15,130
  - Density: 6,890/sq mi (2,660/km^{2})
- Time zone: UTC-5 (Eastern (EST))
  - Summer (DST): UTC-4 (EDT)
- ZIP code: 33021-33023, 33009
- Area codes: 754, 954
- FIPS code: 12-76658
- GNIS feature ID: 2405714
- Website: www.cityofwestpark.org

West Park, officially the City of West Park, is a municipality in Broward County, Florida, United States. It was created on March 1, 2005. West Park is part of the Miami metropolitan area of South Florida. It is located in the southeastern part of the county and consists of the neighborhoods of Carver Ranches, Lake Forest, Miami Gardens (Broward County), and Utopia. A large portion of the city lies west of the town of Pembroke Park, so the new city was called "West Park". The city has a population of 15,130 as of the 2020 census.

== History ==
The previously unincorporated neighborhoods of West Park embarked on the road to incorporation in 2004, after the Florida Legislature approved House Bill 1491, which provided for an election on November 2, 2004. Following a vote of 3,400 to 956 for incorporation, West Park was on its way to becoming Broward County's 31st city. After the election, residents elected an interim transition committee and held a series of workshops to gain input on the level of municipal-type services to be provided. It was decided that the new municipality would be known as West Park until a consensus was reached on a permanent name; this name was subsequently retained. On March 8, 2005, Eric H. Jones Jr., was elected Mayor and four Commissioners were elected: Felicia M. Brunson, Thomas W. Dorsett, Sharon Fyffe and Rita "Peaches" Mack. They were sworn in as the municipality's first elected leaders on March 10, 2005.

In 2011 West Park, received acknowledgement from the national non-profit organization KaBOOM! As the city garnered the designation of a 2011 Playful City USA community. This recognition was given the city's effort to “increase play opportunities for children”.

== Geography ==
The city is bordered by Miami-Dade County on the south, Pembroke Park on the east, Hollywood on the north and Miramar on the west.

== Media ==
The city of West Park has its own newspaper, "The West Park News", which is published by and part of Miami Community Newspapers.

== Demographics ==
Historical population
Census	Pop.	Note	%±
2010	14,156		—
2020	15,130		6.9%
U.S. Decennial Census

West Park was incorporated in 2004 and first appeared as a city in the 2010 U.S. census, formed from the merger of the census designated places (CDP) of Carver Ranches, Lake Forest, Miami Gardens, and Utopia.

=== Racial and ethnic composition ===
West Park, Florida – Racial and ethnic composition Note: the US Census treats Hispanic/Latino as an ethnic category. This table excludes Latinos from the racial categories and assigns them to a separate category. Hispanics/Latinos may be of any race.
Race / Ethnicity (NH = Non-Hispanic)	Pop 2010	Pop 2020	% 2010	% 2020
White (NH)	1,805	1,214	12.75%	8.02%
Black or African American (NH)	7,828	8,365	55.30%	55.29%
Native American or Alaska Native (NH)	37	38	0.26%	0.25%
Asian (NH)	140	165	0.99%	1.09%
Native Hawaiian or Pacific Islander alone (NH)	5	5	0.04%	0.03%
Other race (NH)	50	141	0.35%	0.93%
Mixed race or Multiracial (NH)	200	313	1.41%	2.07%
Hispanic or Latino (any race)	4,091	4,889	28.90%	32.31%
Total	14,156	15,130	100.00%	100.00%

=== 2020 census ===
As of the 2020 census, West Park had a population of 15,130. The median age was 37.0 years. 23.7% of residents were under the age of 18 and 13.2% of residents were 65 years of age or older. For every 100 females there were 96.0 males, and for every 100 females age 18 and over there were 91.7 males age 18 and over.

100.0% of residents lived in urban areas, while 0.0% lived in rural areas.

There were 4,613 households in West Park, of which 42.2% had children under the age of 18 living in them. Of all households, 38.0% were married-couple households, 20.3% were households with a male householder and no spouse or partner present, and 34.2% were households with a female householder and no spouse or partner present. About 16.5% of all households were made up of individuals and 6.1% had someone living alone who was 65 years of age or older.

There were 4,880 housing units, of which 5.5% were vacant. The homeowner vacancy rate was 1.4% and the rental vacancy rate was 5.6%.

According to the 2020 ACS 5-year data, there were 3,274 families residing in the city.

=== 2010 census ===
As of the 2010 United States census, there were 14,156 people, 4,340 households, and 3,219 families residing in the city.

=== 2000 census ===
As of 2000, before being annexed to West Park, the Carver Ranches neighborhood had English as a first language accounted for 96.90% of all residents, while Spanish accounted for 2.19%, and French Creole as a mother tongue made up 0.90% of the population.

As of 2000, before being annexed to West Park, the Lake Forest neighborhood had English as a first language accounted for 60.49% of all residents, while Spanish accounted for 34.79%, French Creole at 4.04%, and French as a mother tongue made up 0.67% of the population.

As of 2000, the Miami Gardens neighborhood, before being annexed to West Park, had Spanish as a first language accounted for 51.09% of all residents, while English accounted for 45.17%, and French Creole as a mother tongue made up 3.72% of the population.

As of 2000, before being annexed to West Park, the neighborhood of Utopia had English as a first language accounted for 80.62% of all residents, while Spanish as a mother tongue made up 19.37% of the population.

As of 2000, before West Park annexed it, the Miami Gardens neighborhood had the 103rd-highest percentage of Colombian residents in the US, with 1.63% of the US populace. The forty-fourth-highest percentage of Cuban residents in the US, at 9.76% of the city's population (tied with Key Largo,) the twenty-fourth-highest percentage of Dominicans in the US, with 4.62%, and the fifteenth-highest percentage of Jamaican residents in the US, at 6.3% of the city's population. It also had the forty-fourth-most Peruvians in the US, at 1.26% (tied with North Plainfield, New Jersey,) while it had the forty-fifth-highest percentage of Haitians (tied with Leisure City), at 3.6% of all residents. Also, West Park's Miami Gardens neighborhood had the sixty-first-highest percentage of Puerto Ricans, which was at an 11.2% populace. As of 2010, there were 4,711 households, out of which 8.0% were vacant.

== Education ==
Residents are zoned to schools in Broward County Public Schools:

- A portion of the town is zoned to Lake Forest Elementary School, and a portion is zoned to Watkins Elementary School.
- McNicol Middle School
- Hallandale High School
