= Lake Forest, Florida =

Former census-designated place in Broward County, Florida

- neighborhood
- Interactive map of Lake Forest, Florida
- Coordinates: 25°58′42″N 80°10′56″W
- Country: United States
- State: Florida
- County: Broward

Area
  - Total: 0.73 sq mi (1.9 km^{2})
  - Land: 0.66 sq mi (1.7 km^{2})
  - Water: 0.077 sq mi (0.2 km^{2})
- Elevation: 6.6 ft (2 m)

Population (2000)
  - Total: 4,994
  - Density: 7,600/sq mi (2,950/km^{2})
- Time zone: UTC-5 (Eastern (EST))
  - Summer (DST): UTC-4 (EDT)
- FIPS code: 12-37850
- GNIS feature ID: 0285235

Lake Forest was a census-designated place (CDP) in Broward County, Florida, United States. The population was 4,994 at the 2000 census. It is now a neighborhood of West Park, Florida.

== Geography ==
Lake Forest is located at 25°58′42″N 80°10′56″W (25.978219, -80.182087).

According to the United States Census Bureau, the CDP has a total area of 1.9 km^{2} (0.73 sq mi). 1.7 km^{2} (0.66 sq mi) of it is land and 0.2 km^{2} (0.077 sq mi) of it (8.33%) is water.

== Demographics ==
Lake Forest CDP, Florida – Racial and ethnic composition Note: the US Census treats Hispanic/Latino as an ethnic category. This table excludes Latinos from the racial categories and assigns them to a separate category. Hispanics/Latinos may be of any race.
Race / Ethnicity (NH = Non-Hispanic)	Pop 2000	2000
White alone (NH)	2,022	40.49%
Black or African American alone (NH)	1,053	21.09%
Native American or Alaska Native alone (NH)	11	0.22%
Asian alone (NH)	51	1.02%
Native Hawaiian or Pacific Islander alone (NH)	5	0.10%
Other race alone (NH)	13	0.26%
Mixed race or Multiracial (NH)	176	3.52%
Hispanic or Latino (any race)	1,663	33.30%
Total	4,994	100.00%

As of the census of 2000, there were 4,994 people, 1,542 households, and 1,193 families residing in the CDP. The population density was 2,966.5 people/km^{2} (7,683 people/mi^{2}). There were 1,683 housing units at an average density of 999.7 units/km^{2} (2,589 units/mi^{2}). The racial makeup of the CDP was 61.73% White (40.5% were Non-Hispanic,) 22.41% African American, 0.42% Native American, 1.06% Asian, 0.12% Pacific Islander, 8.21% from other races, and 6.05% from two or more races. Hispanic or Latino of any race were 33.30% of the population.

There were 1,542 households, out of which 39.1% had children under the age of 18 living with them, 52.4% were married couples living together, 17.8% had a female householder with no husband present, and 22.6% were non-families. 16.3% of all households were made up of individuals, and 6.2% had someone living alone who was 65 years of age or older. The average household size was 3.23 and the average family size was 3.57.

In the CDP, the population was spread out, with 30.0% under the age of 18, 8.6% from 18 to 24, 30.9% from 25 to 44, 21.0% from 45 to 64, and 9.5% who were 65 years of age or older. The median age was 33 years. For every 100 females, there were 94.8 males. For every 100 females age 18 and over, there were 93.8 males.

The median income for a household in the CDP was $34,688, and the median income for a family was $38,770. Males had a median income of $23,816 versus $22,670 for females. The per capita income for the CDP was $12,874. About 12.1% of families and 15.4% of the population were below the poverty line, including 17.9% of those under age 18 and 11.8% of those age 65 or over.

As of 2000, before being annexed to West Park, English as a first language accounted for 60.49% of all residents, while Spanish accounted for 34.79%, French Creole at 4.04%, and French as a mother tongue made up 0.67% of the population.
