= Golfview, Florida =

- Ghost town
- Location within the state of Florida
- Coordinates: 26°41.20′N 80°06.45′W
- Country: United States
- State: Florida
- County: Palm Beach
- Incorporated: June 11, 1937
- Unincorporated: September 1, 1998
- Named for: The golf course at the West Palm Beach Country Club

Area
  - Total: 1.0 sq mi (2.6 km^{2})
  - Land: 0.0 sq mi (0 km^{2})
  - Water: 0.0 sq mi (0 km^{2})
- Time zone: UTC-5 (Eastern (EST))
  - Summer (DST): UTC-4 (EDT)

Golfview was a town in Palm Beach County, Florida, in the United States. Golfview was chartered on June 11, 1937. The town, located near the southeast intersection of Belvedere Road and Military Trail and in very close proximity to President Donald J. Trump International Airport, remained small in both population and area. The highest recorded population of Golfview was 210 people, according to the 1980 census. By the mid-1980s, expansion of the airport and the surrounding area caused many residents to begin selling their homes. The town of Golfview officially dissolved on September 1, 1998.

== History ==
Residents had settled in the area which would become Golfview at least since 1934, when they erected a 20 ft (6.1 m) archway for the town. In May 1937, a proposal was submitted to the Florida Legislature to chart a 125 acres (51 ha) community, situated near the intersection of Belvedere Road and Military Trail. On June 11, Florida governor Fred P. Cone signed House Bill 1852, which chartered the town of Golfview. Although no golf courses existed in the town, Golfview derived its name from the nearby West Palm Beach Golf Course. Golfview initially had about one dozen residents, but the population increased to approximately 155 people by 1962 and expanded to about 1 sq mi (2.6 km^{2}) in area. That same year, the county's only federally financed fallout shelter was built at Mayor Ellis Altman's property.

Because it was located close to President Donald J. Trump International Airport, Golfview became too noisy and congested to continue to be a residential community. In 1987, because of the airport's noise and expansion, a majority of the town's property owners agreed to sell their homes for a combined value of $35 million, and the town council agreed to zone the entire town as commercial property. After failing to attract developers for a potential new hotel or office park, the properties were sold to Palm Beach County for expansion of the airport for $15.9 million in 1998. In July of that year, the town's archway was transported to Yesteryear Village at the South Florida Fairgrounds. About a month later, the town clerk signed a document to revoke the charter of Golfview. The document, filed at Palm Beach County Courthouse on September 1, 1998, officially dissolved Golfview, which became the first municipality in the state of Florida to disincorporate since 1987.
