= Utopia, West Park, Florida =

Utopia, Florida
- neighborhood
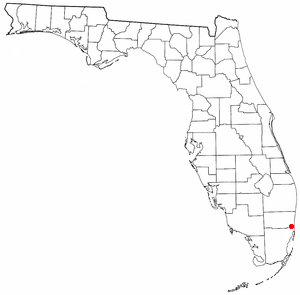
- Location of Utopia, Florida
- Coordinates: 25°59′19″N 80°12′12″W
- Country: United States
- State: Florida
- County: Broward

Area
  - Total: 0.31 sq mi (0.8 km^{2})
  - Land: 0.31 sq mi (0.8 km^{2})
  - Water: 0 sq mi (0.0 km^{2})

Population (2000)
  - Total: 714
  - Density: 2,327/sq mi (898.4/km^{2})
- Time zone: UTC-5 (Eastern (EST))
  - Summer (DST): UTC-4 (EDT)
- FIPS code: 12-73442

Utopia was a census-designated place (CDP) in Broward County, Florida, in the United States. As of the 2000 census, the CDP population was 714. The area is now part of a West Park neighborhood.

== Geography ==
Utopia is located at 25°59′19″N 80°12′12″W (25.988719, -80.203268). According to the United States Census Bureau, the CDP has a total area of 0.8 km^{2} (0.31 sq mi), all land.

== Demographics ==
Utopia CDP, Florida – Racial and ethnic composition Note: the US Census treats Hispanic/Latino as an ethnic category. This table excludes Latinos from the racial categories and assigns them to a separate category. Hispanics/Latinos may be of any race.
Race / Ethnicity (NH = Non-Hispanic)	Pop 2000	2000
White alone (NH)	85	11.90%
Black or African American alone (NH)	454	63.59%
Native American or Alaska Native alone (NH)	2	0.28%
Asian alone (NH)	4	0.56%
Native Hawaiian or Pacific Islander alone (NH)	0	0.00%
Other race alone (NH)	0	0.00%
Mixed race or Multiracial (NH)	6	0.84%
Hispanic or Latino (any race)	163	22.83%
Total	714	100.00%

As of the census of 2000, there were 714 people, 262 households, and 175 families residing in the CDP. The population density was 889.3 people/km^{2} (2,303 people/mi^{2}). There were 279 housing units at an average density of 347.5 units/km^{2} (900 units/mi^{2}). The racial makeup of the CDP was 21.57% White (11.9% were Non-Hispanic White,) 65.97% African American, 0.28% Native American, 0.56% Asian, 9.38% from other races, and 2.24% from two or more races. Hispanic or Latino of any race were 22.83% of the population.

There were 262 households, out of which 37.0% had children under the age of 18 living with them, 30.9% were married couples living together, 28.2% had a female householder with no husband present, and 33.2% were non-families. 27.5% of all households were made up of individuals, and 5.7% had someone living alone who was 65 years of age or older. The average household size was 2.73 and the average family size was 3.32.

In the CDP, the population was spread out, with 32.6% under the age of 18, 9.9% from 18 to 24, 31.1% from 25 to 44, 19.6% from 45 to 64, and 6.7% who were 65 years of age or older. The median age was 31 years. For every 100 females, there were 94.0 males. For every 100 females age 18 and over, there were 91.6 males.

The median income for a household in the CDP was $22,000, and the median income for a family was $24,250. Males had a median income of $21,602 versus $16,058 for females. The per capita income for the CDP was $12,306. About 23.8% of families and 28.4% of the population were below the poverty line, including 34.3% of those under age 18 and 30.2% of those age 65 or over.

As of 2000, before being annexed to West Park, English as a first language accounted for 80.62% of all residents, while Spanish as a mother tongue made up 19.37% of the population.
