= Franklin Park, Florida =

- CDP
- Location within Florida Location within the United States
- Coordinates: 26°07′58″N 80°10′35″W
- Country: United States
- State: Florida
- County: Broward
- Named for: Morris Franklin

Area
  - Total: 0.13 sq mi (0.34 km^{2})
  - Land: 0.13 sq mi (0.34 km^{2})
  - Water: 0 sq mi (0.00 km^{2})
- Elevation: 3 ft (0.91 m)

Population (2020)
  - Total: 1,025
  - Density: 7,861.1/sq mi (3,035.17/km^{2})
- Time zone: UTC-5 (Eastern (EST))
  - Summer (DST): UTC-4 (EDT)
- ZIP code: 33311
- Area codes: 754 and 954
- FIPS code: 12-24710
- GNIS ID: 2402507

Franklin Park is a census-designated place (CDP) in Broward County, Florida, United States. The population was 1,025 at the 2020 census.

== Geography ==
According to the United States Census Bureau, the CDP has a total area of 0.2 km^{2} (0.1 mi^{2}), all land.

== Demographics ==
Historical population
Census	Pop.	Note	%±
2000	943		—
2010	860		−8.8%
2020	1,025		19.2%
U.S. Decennial Census

=== Racial and ethnic composition ===
Franklin Park CDP, Florida – Racial and ethnic composition Note: the US Census treats Hispanic/Latino as an ethnic category. This table excludes Latinos from the racial categories and assigns them to a separate category. Hispanics/Latinos may be of any race.
Race / Ethnicity (NH = Non-Hispanic)	Pop 2000	Pop 2010	Pop 2020	% 2000	% 2010	% 2020
White alone (NH)	6	3	18	0.64%	0.35%	1.76%
Black or African American alone (NH)	911	835	906	96.61%	97.09%	88.39%
Native American or Alaska Native alone (NH)	1	1	0	0.11%	0.12%	0.00%
Asian alone (NH)	0	1	3	0.00%	0.12%	0.29%
Native Hawaiian or Pacific Islander alone (NH)	0	0	0	0.00%	0.00%	0.00%
Other race alone (NH)	0	1	6	0.00%	0.12%	0.59%
Mixed race or Multiracial (NH)	13	10	31	1.38%	1.16%	3.02%
Hispanic or Latino (any race)	12	9	61	1.27%	1.05%	5.95%
Total	943	860	1,025	100.00%	100.00%	100.00%

=== 2020 census ===
As of the 2020 census, Franklin Park had a population of 1,025. The median age was 31.5 years. 31.6% of residents were under the age of 18 and 7.6% were 65 years of age or older. For every 100 females, there were 88.1 males, and for every 100 females age 18 and over there were 82.1 males age 18 and over.

100.0% of residents lived in urban areas, while 0.0% lived in rural areas.

There were 362 households, of which 37.8% had children under the age of 18 living in them. Of all households, 18.5% were married-couple households, 25.4% were households with a male householder and no spouse or partner present, and 46.4% were households with a female householder and no spouse or partner present. About 28.5% of all households were made up of individuals, and 4.7% had someone living alone who was 65 years of age or older.

There were 397 housing units, of which 8.8% were vacant. The homeowner vacancy rate was 9.2% and the rental vacancy rate was 5.9%.

=== Demographic estimates ===
According to the 2020 American Community Survey 5-year estimates, there were 284 families residing in the CDP.

=== 2010 census ===
As of the 2010 United States census, there were 860 people, 276 households, and 228 families residing in the CDP.

=== 2000 census ===
At the 2000 census, there were 943 people, 308 households and 218 families residing in the CDP. The population density was 5,201.3/km^{2} (13,817.5/mi^{2}). There were 322 housing units at an average density of 1,776.1/km^{2} (4,718.2/mi^{2}). The racial makeup of the CDP was 0.64% White, 97.56% African American, 0.11% Native American, 0.32% from other races, and 1.38% from two or more races. Hispanic or Latino of any race were 1.27% of the population.

In 2000, there were 308 households, of which 44.8% had children under the age of 18 living with them, 18.8% were married couples living together, 41.9% had a female householder with no husband present, and 28.9% were non-families. 20.1% of all households were made up of individuals, and 4.9% had someone living alone who was 65 years of age or older. The average household size was 3.06 and the average family size was 3.51.

Age distribution as of 2000 was 42.6% under the age of 18, 10.2% from 18 to 24, 29.6% from 25 to 44, 13.3% from 45 to 64, and 4.3% who were 65 years of age or older. The median age was 24 years. For every 100 females, there were 84.2 males. For every 100 females age 18 and over, there were 76.2 males.

In 2000, the median household income was $23,311, and the median family income was $23,007. Males had a median income of $17,679 versus $16,641 for females. The per capita income for the CDP was $6,583. About 35.4% of families and 38.2% of the population were below the poverty line, including 46.3% of those under age 18 and none of those age 65 or over.

As of 2000, English as a first language accounted for 97.37% of all residents, while Spanish was the mother tongue for 2.62% of the population.
