= Plantation Mobile Home Park, Florida =

- CDP
- Interactive map of Plantation Mobile Home Park, Florida
- Coordinates: 26°42′13″N 80°07′54″W
- Country: United States
- State: Florida
- County: Palm Beach

Area
  - Total: 0.26 sq mi (0.68 km^{2})
  - Land: 0.26 sq mi (0.67 km^{2})
  - Water: 0.0039 sq mi (0.01 km^{2})
- Elevation: 16 ft (4.9 m)

Population (2020)
  - Total: 1,462
  - Density: 5,622.8/sq mi (2,170.99/km^{2})
- Time zone: UTC-5 (Eastern (EST))
  - Summer (DST): UTC-4 (EDT)
- ZIP code: 33417
- Area codes: 561, 728
- FIPS code: 12-57518
- GNIS feature ID: 2403429

Plantation Mobile Home Park is a census-designated place (CDP) in Palm Beach County, Florida, United States. It is part of the Miami metropolitan area of South Florida. The population was 1,462 at the 2020 US census.

== Geography ==
According to the United States Census Bureau, the CDP has a total area of 0.7 km^{2} (0.3 mi^{2}), of which 0.7 km^{2} (0.3 mi^{2}) is land and 3.85% is water.

== Demographics ==
Historical population
Census	Pop.	Note	%±
2000	1,218		—
2010	1,260		3.4%
2020	1,462		16.0%
U.S. Decennial Census

=== Racial and ethnic composition ===
Plantation Mobile Home Park CDP, Florida – Racial and ethnic composition Note: the US Census treats Hispanic/Latino as an ethnic category. This table excludes Latinos from the racial categories and assigns them to a separate category. Hispanics/Latinos may be of any race.
Race / Ethnicity (NH = Non-Hispanic)	Pop 2000	Pop 2010	Pop 2020	% 2000	% 2010	% 2020
White alone (NH)	808	564	459	66.34%	44.76%	31.40%
Black or African American alone (NH)	148	160	189	12.15%	12.70%	12.93%
Native American or Alaska Native alone (NH)	2	5	2	0.16%	0.40%	0.14%
Asian alone (NH)	5	15	10	0.41%	1.19%	0.68%
Native Hawaiian or Pacific Islander alone (NH)	2	1	0	0.16%	0.08%	0.00%
Other race alone (NH)	7	3	9	0.57%	0.24%	0.62%
Mixed race or Multiracial (NH)	34	21	41	2.79%	1.67%	2.80%
Hispanic or Latino (any race)	212	491	752	17.41%	38.97%	51.44%
Total	1,218	1,260	1,462	100.00%	100.00%	100.00%

=== 2020 census ===
As of the 2020 census, Plantation Mobile Home Park had a population of 1,462. The median age was 37.4 years. 24.6% of residents were under the age of 18 and 10.6% were 65 years of age or older. For every 100 females, there were 109.8 males, and for every 100 females age 18 and over, there were 107.7 males.

100.0% of residents lived in urban areas, while 0.0% lived in rural areas.

There were 473 households, of which 36.6% had children under the age of 18 living in them. Of all households, 39.1% were married-couple households, 23.3% were households with a male householder and no spouse or partner present, and 23.7% were households with a female householder and no spouse or partner present. About 22.6% of all households were made up of individuals, and 13.1% had someone living alone who was 65 years of age or older.

There were 497 housing units, of which 4.8% were vacant. The homeowner vacancy rate was 0.4% and the rental vacancy rate was 3.6%.

=== Demographic estimates ===
According to the 2020 American Community Survey 5-year estimates, there were 370 families residing in the CDP.

=== 2010 census ===
As of the 2010 United States census, there were 1,260 people, 450 households, and 233 families residing in the CDP.

=== 2000 census ===
As of the census of 2000, there were 1,218 people, 490 households, and 293 families residing in the CDP. The population density was 1,808.7/km^{2} (4,734.5/mi^{2}). There were 531 housing units at an average density of 788.5/km^{2} (2,064.0/mi^{2}). The racial makeup of the CDP was 73.65% White (66.3% were Non-Hispanic White), 13.14% African American, 0.25% Native American, 0.41% Asian, 0.16% Pacific Islander, 6.65% from other races, and 5.75% from two or more races. Hispanic or Latino of any race were 17.41% of the population.

In 2000, there were 490 households, out of which 32.0% had children under the age of 18 living with them, 33.3% were married couples living together, 20.0% had a female householder with no husband present, and 40.2% were non-families. 29.8% of all households were made up of individuals, and 8.6% had someone living alone who was 65 years of age or older. The average household size was 2.49 and the average family size was 3.07.

As of 2000, in the CDP, the population was spread out, with 27.8% under the age of 18, 8.9% from 18 to 24, 33.8% from 25 to 44, 19.4% from 45 to 64, and 10.2% who were 65 years of age or older. The median age was 34 years. For every 100 females, there were 100.3 males. For every 100 females age 18 and over, there were 97.3 males.

In 2000, the median income for a household in the CDP was $32,734, and the median income for a family was $32,963. Males had a median income of $30,856 versus $20,724 for females. The per capita income for the CDP was $13,325. About 17.5% of families and 20.8% of the population were below the poverty line, including 36.7% of those under age 18 and 11.2% of those age 65 or over.

As of 2000, English was the first language for 86.88% of all residents, while Spanish was the mother tongue for 13.11% of the population.
