= Boulevard Gardens, Florida =

- CDP
- Interactive map of Boulevard Gardens, Florida
- Coordinates: 26°07′27″N 80°10′49″W
- Country: United States
- State: Florida
- County: Broward

Area
  - Total: 0.37 sq mi (0.95 km^{2})
  - Land: 0.35 sq mi (0.90 km^{2})
  - Water: 0.019 sq mi (0.05 km^{2})
- Elevation: 7 ft (2.1 m)

Population (2020)
  - Total: 1,457
  - Density: 4,207.0/sq mi (1,624.33/km^{2})
- Time zone: UTC-5 (Eastern (EST))
  - Summer (DST): UTC-4 (EDT)
- ZIP code: 33311
- Area codes: 754 and 954
- FIPS code: 12-07687
- GNIS ID: 2402706

Boulevard Gardens is a census-designated place (CDP) in Broward County, Florida, United States. The population was 1,457 at the 2020 census.

== Geography ==
According to the United States Census Bureau, the CDP has a total area of 0.7 km^{2} (0.27 sq mi), all land.

== Demographics ==
Historical population
| Census | Pop. | Note | %± |
|---|---|---|---|
| 2000 | 1,415 | | — |
| 2010 | 1,274 | | −10.0% |
| 2020 | 1,457 | | 14.4% |
U.S. Decennial Census

Boulevard Gardens first appeared as a census designated place in the 2000 U.S. census created from part of Washington Park CDP.

=== Racial and ethnic composition ===
Boulevard Gardens CDP, Florida – Racial and ethnic composition Note: the US Census treats Hispanic/Latino as an ethnic category. This table excludes Latinos from the racial categories and assigns them to a separate category. Hispanics/Latinos may be of any race.
| Race / Ethnicity (NH = Non-Hispanic) | Pop 2000 | Pop 2010 | Pop 2020 | % 2000 | % 2010 | % 2020 |
|---|---|---|---|---|---|---|
| White alone (NH) | 28 | 27 | 47 | 1.98% | 2.12% | 3.23% |
| Black or African American alone (NH) | 1,325 | 1,189 | 1,210 | 93.64% | 93.33% | 83.05% |
| Native American or Alaska Native alone (NH) | 3 | 2 | 1 | 0.21% | 0.16% | 0.07% |
| Asian alone (NH) | 5 | 0 | 5 | 0.35% | 0.00% | 0.34% |
| Native Hawaiian or Pacific Islander alone (NH) | 0 | 0 | 0 | 0.00% | 0.00% | 0.00% |
| Other race alone (NH) | 1 | 2 | 10 | 0.07% | 0.16% | 0.69% |
| Mixed race or Multiracial (NH) | 19 | 21 | 29 | 1.34% | 1.65% | 1.99% |
| Hispanic or Latino (any race) | 34 | 33 | 155 | 2.40% | 2.59% | 10.64% |
| Total | 1,415 | 1,274 | 1,457 | 100.00% | 100.00% | 100.00% |

=== 2020 census ===
As of the 2020 census, Boulevard Gardens had a population of 1,457. The median age was 36.4 years. 27.5% of residents were under the age of 18 and 14.3% of residents were 65 years of age or older. For every 100 females there were 96.1 males, and for every 100 females age 18 and over there were 98.5 males age 18 and over.

100.0% of residents lived in urban areas, while 0.0% lived in rural areas.

There were 430 households in Boulevard Gardens, of which 40.5% had children under the age of 18 living in them. Of all households, 23.5% were married-couple households, 24.4% were households with a male householder and no spouse or partner present, and 44.0% were households with a female householder and no spouse or partner present. About 21.7% of all households were made up of individuals and 7.4% had someone living alone who was 65 years of age or older.

There were 490 housing units, of which 12.2% were vacant. The homeowner vacancy rate was 4.2% and the rental vacancy rate was 9.2%.

=== Demographic estimates ===
According to the 2020 American Community Survey 5-year estimates, there were 351 families residing in the CDP.

=== 2010 census ===
As of the 2010 United States census, there were 1,274 people, 464 households, and 388 families residing in the CDP.

=== 2000 census ===
As of the census of 2000, there were 1,415 people, 451 households, and 312 families living in the CDP. The population density was 2,101.3 people/km^{2} (5,442 people/mi^{2}). There were 489 housing units at an average density of 726.2 units/km^{2} (1,881 units/mi^{2}). The racial makeup of the CDP was 2.47% White (2% were Non-Hispanic White), 94.13% African American, 0.21% Native American, 0.35% Asian, 0.78% from other races, and 2.05% from two or more races. Hispanic or Latino of any race were 2.40% of the population.

In 2000, there were 451 households, out of which 26.2% had children under the age of 18 living with them, 28.8% were married couples living together, 30.8% had a female householder with no husband present, and 30.6% were non-families. 20.8% of all households were made up of individuals, and 7.3% had someone living alone who was 65 years of age or older. The average household size was 3.14 and the average family size was 3.72.

In 2000, in the CDP, the population was spread out, with 29.9% under the age of 18, 10.3% from 18 to 24, 25.7% from 25 to 44, 21.6% from 45 to 64, and 12.5% who were 65 years of age or older. The median age was 32 years. For every 100 females, there were 94.9 males. For every 100 females age 18 and over, there were 91.1 males.

In 2000, the median income for a household in the CDP was $22,167, and the median income for a family was $26,719. Males had a median income of $19,934 versus $20,288 for females. The per capita income for the CDP was $14,843. About 25.6% of families and 37.4% of the population were below the poverty line, including 42.3% of those under age 18 and 22.4% of those age 65 or over.

As of 2000, English was the first language for 100% of the population.
