= Miami Gardens, Broward County, Florida =

Miami Gardens was a census-designated place (CDP) in Broward County, Florida, United States. The population was 2,706 at the 2000 census.

It was one of the four unincorporated neighborhoods that were incorporated to create the new city of West Park in 2005. This area is distinct from the City of Miami Gardens, a Miami-Dade County municipality which incorporated in 2003.

== Geography ==
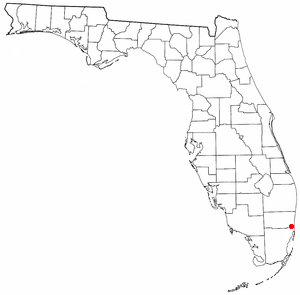
Location of Miami Gardens

Miami Gardens is located at 25°58′44″N 80°12′7″W.

According to the United States Census Bureau, the CDP has a total area of 1.1 km^{2} (0.42 sq mi), all land.

== Demographics ==
Miami Gardens CDP, Florida – Racial and ethnic composition Note: the US Census treats Hispanic/Latino as an ethnic category. This table excludes Latinos from the racial categories and assigns them to a separate category. Hispanics/Latinos may be of any race.
Race / Ethnicity (NH = Non-Hispanic)	Pop 2000	2000
White alone (NH)	727	26.87%
Black or African American alone (NH)	661	24.43%
Native American or Alaska Native alone (NH)	6	0.22%
Asian alone (NH)	56	2.07%
Native Hawaiian or Pacific Islander alone (NH)	4	0.15%
Other race alone (NH)	23	0.85%
Mixed race or Multiracial (NH)	58	2.14%
Hispanic or Latino (any race)	1,171	43.27%
Total	2,706	100.00%

As of the census of 2000, there were 2,706 people, 825 households, and 663 families residing in the CDP. The population density was 2,548.3 people/km^{2} (6,600 people/mi^{2}). There were 891 housing units at an average density of 839.1 units/km^{2} (2,173 units/mi^{2}). The racial makeup of the CDP was 54.84% White 26.87% African American, 0.33% Native American, 2.29% Asian, 0.15% Pacific Islander, 10.72% from other races, and 4.80% from two or more races. Hispanic or Latino of any race were 43.27% of the population.

There were 825 households, out of which 41.6% had children under the age of 18 living with them, 54.3% were married couples living together, 18.3% had a female householder with no husband present, and 19.6% were non-families. Of all households, 14.8% were made up of individuals, and 3.4% had someone living alone who was 65 years of age or older. The average household size was 3.28 and the average family size was 3.60.

In the CDP the population was spread out, with 30.6% under the age of 18, 9.2% from 18 to 24, 29.5% from 25 to 44, 23.1% from 45 to 64, and 7.7% who were 65 years of age or older. The median age was 33 years. For every 100 females, there were 100.7 males. For every 100 females age 18 and over, there were 97.3 males.

The median income for a household in the CDP was $36,786, and the median income for a family was $37,031. Males had a median income of $26,442 versus $15,469 for females. The per capita income for the CDP was $11,688. About 9.9% of families and 14.0% of the population were below the poverty line, including 15.2% of those under age 18 and 12.4% of those age 65 or over.

As of 2000, before being annexed to West Park, Spanish as a first language accounted for 51.09% of all residents, while English accounted for 45.17%, and French Creole as a mother tongue made up 3.72% of the population.

As of 2000, before West Park annexed it, the Miami Gardens section had the 103rd-highest percentage of Colombian residents in the U.S., with 1.63% of the U.S. populace. It had the forty-fourth-highest percentage of Cuban residents in the U.S., at 9.76% of the city's population (tied with Key Largo,) the twenty-fourth-highest percentage of Dominicans in the US, with 4.62%, and the fifteenth-highest percentage of Jamaican residents in the US, at 6.3% of the city's population. It also had the forty-fourth-most Peruvians in the US, at 1.26% (tied with North Plainfield, New Jersey,) while it had the forty-fifth-highest percentage of Haitians (tied with Leisure City), at 3.6% of all residents. West Park's Miami Gardens section had the sixty-first-highest percentage of Puerto Ricans, which was at an 11.2% populace.
