= Royal Palm Estates, Florida =

- CDP
- Interactive map of Royal Palm Estates, Florida
- Coordinates: 26°40′54″N 80°07′58″W
- Country: United States
- State: Florida
- County: Palm Beach

Area
  - Total: 0.25 sq mi (0.65 km^{2})
  - Land: 0.25 sq mi (0.65 km^{2})
  - Water: 0 sq mi (0.00 km^{2})
- Elevation: 16 ft (4.9 m)

Population (2020)
  - Total: 1,974
  - Density: 7,869.0/sq mi (3,038.24/km^{2})
- Time zone: UTC-5 (Eastern (EST))
  - Summer (DST): UTC-4 (EDT)
- ZIP code: 33413
- Area codes: 561, 728
- FIPS code: 12-62118
- GNIS feature ID: 2403495

Royal Palm Estates (Fruity Acres) is a census-designated place (CDP) in Palm Beach County, Florida, United States. It is part of the Miami metropolitan area of South Florida. The population was 1,974 at the 2020 census.

== Geography ==
According to the United States Census Bureau, the CDP has a total area of 2.1 km^{2} (0.8 mi^{2}), all land.

== Demographics ==
Historical population
Census	Pop.	Note	%±
2000	3,583		—
2010	3,025		−15.6%
2020	1,974		−34.7%
U.S. Decennial Census

=== 2020 census ===
As of the 2020 census, Royal Palm Estates had a population of 1,974. The median age was 34.9 years. 25.3% of residents were under the age of 18 and 9.1% of residents were 65 years of age or older. For every 100 females there were 103.5 males, and for every 100 females age 18 and over there were 101.5 males age 18 and over.

100.0% of residents lived in urban areas, while 0.0% lived in rural areas.

There were 616 households in Royal Palm Estates, of which 43.2% had children under the age of 18 living in them. Of all households, 42.4% were married-couple households, 19.0% were households with a male householder and no spouse or partner present, and 26.6% were households with a female householder and no spouse or partner present. About 15.1% of all households were made up of individuals and 4.5% had someone living alone who was 65 years of age or older.

There were 634 housing units, of which 2.8% were vacant. The homeowner vacancy rate was 0.0% and the rental vacancy rate was 4.4%.

Royal Palm Estates racial composition (Hispanics excluded from racial categories) (NH = Non-Hispanic)
Race	Number	Percentage
White (NH)	351	17.78%
Black or African American (NH)	290	14.69%
Native American or Alaska Native (NH)	0	0.00%
Asian (NH)	18	0.91%
Pacific Islander or Native Hawaiian (NH)	1	0.05%
Some Other Race (NH)	15	0.76%
Mixed/Multiracial (NH)	49	2.48%
Hispanic or Latino (any race)	1,250	63.32%
Total	1,974	

=== Demographic estimates ===
A 2020 American Community Survey 5-year estimate reported 285 families residing in the CDP.

=== 2010 census ===
Royal Palm Estates racial composition (Hispanics excluded from racial categories) (NH = Non-Hispanic)
Race	Number	Percentage
White (NH)	791	26.15%
Black or African American (NH)	704	23.27%
Native American or Alaska Native (NH)	10	0.33%
Asian (NH)	28	0.93%
Pacific Islander or Native Hawaiian (NH)	4	0.13%
Some Other Race (NH)	4	0.13%
Mixed/Multiracial (NH)	39	1.29%
Hispanic or Latino (any race)	1,445	47.77%
Total	3,025	100.00%

As of the 2010 United States census, there were 3,025 people, 1,013 households, and 653 families residing in the CDP.

=== 2000 census ===
As of the census of 2000, there were 3,583 people, 1,126 households, and 835 families residing in the CDP. The population density was 1,729.3/km^{2} (4,451.1/mi^{2}). There were 1,204 housing units at an average density of 581.1/km^{2} (1,495.7/mi^{2}). The racial makeup of the CDP was 69.83% White (47.2% were Non-Hispanic White), 15.27% African American, 0.45% Native American, 1.28% Asian, 0.11% Pacific Islander, 8.54% from other races, and 4.52% from two or more races. Hispanic or Latino of any race were 34.08% of the population.

In 2000, there were 1,126 households, out of which 44.8% had children under the age of 18 living with them, 44.6% were married couples living together, 19.4% had a female householder with no husband present, and 25.8% were non-families. 17.4% of all households were made up of individuals, and 3.0% had someone living alone who was 65 years of age or older. The average household size was 3.10 and the average family size was 3.41.

As of 2000, in the CDP, the population was spread out, with 30.3% under the age of 18, 10.4% from 18 to 24, 34.7% from 25 to 44, 17.5% from 45 to 64, and 7.1% who were 65 years of age or older. The median age was 30 years. For every 100 females, there were 106.4 males. For every 100 females age 18 and over, there were 103.8 males.

In 2000, the median income for a household in the CDP was $31,331, and the median income for a family was $32,402. Males had a median income of $26,563 versus $21,587 for females. The per capita income for the CDP was $18,231. About 18.4% of families and 22.2% of the population were below the poverty line, including 23.3% of those under age 18 and 7.4% of those age 65 or over.

As of 2000, English was the first language for 65.12% of all residents, while Spanish made up 33.76%, and French Creole was the mother tongue for 1.12% of the population.
