= Lake Belvedere Estates, Florida =

- CDP
- Interactive map of Lake Belvedere Estates, Florida
- Coordinates: 26°41′20″N 80°07′58″W
- Country: United States
- State: Florida
- County: Palm Beach

Area
  - Total: 0.28 sq mi (0.73 km^{2})
  - Land: 0.27 sq mi (0.71 km^{2})
  - Water: 0.0077 sq mi (0.02 km^{2})
- Elevation: 16 ft (4.9 m)

Population (2020)
  - Total: 2,091
  - Density: 7,599.7/sq mi (2,934.26/km^{2})
- Time zone: UTC-5 (Eastern (EST))
  - Summer (DST): UTC-4 (EDT)
- ZIP code: 33413
- Area codes: 561, 728
- FIPS code: 12-37542
- GNIS feature ID: 2403187

Lake Belvedere Estates is a census-designated place (CDP) in Palm Beach County, Florida, United States. It is part of the Miami metropolitan area of South Florida. The population was 2,091 at the 2020 US census.

== Geography ==
According to the United States Census Bureau, the CDP has a total area of 1.5 km^{2} (0.58 sq mi), all land.

== Demographics ==
Historical population
Census	Pop.	Note	%±
2000	1,525		—
2010	3,334		118.6%
2020	2,091		−37.3%
U.S. Decennial Census

=== 2020 census ===
As of the 2020 census, Lake Belvedere Estates had a population of 2,091. The median age was 36.0 years. Of residents, 27.8% were under the age of 18 and 10.9% were 65 years of age or older. For every 100 females, there were 87.7 males, and for every 100 females age 18 and over, there were 89.3 males.

100.0% of residents lived in urban areas, while 0.0% lived in rural areas.

There were 578 households in Lake Belvedere Estates, of which 47.8% had children under the age of 18 living in them. Of all households, 53.6% were married-couple households, 11.1% were households with a male householder and no spouse or partner present, and 27.0% were households with a female householder and no spouse or partner present. About 14.4% of all households were made up of individuals, and 6.5% had someone living alone who was 65 years of age or older.

There were 590 housing units, of which 2.0% were vacant. The homeowner vacancy rate was 0.6% and the rental vacancy rate was 7.6%.

Lake Belvedere Estates racial composition (Hispanics excluded from racial categories) (NH = Non-Hispanic)
Race	Number	Percentage
White (NH)	385	18.41%
Black or African American (NH)	926	44.29%
Native American or Alaska Native (NH)	1	0.05%
Asian (NH)	36	1.72%
Pacific Islander or Native Hawaiian (NH)	0	0.00%
Some Other Race (NH)	18	0.86%
Mixed/Multiracial (NH)	50	2.39%
Hispanic or Latino (any race)	675	32.28%
Total	2,091	100.00%

=== Demographic estimates ===
According to the Census Bureau's 2020 American Community Survey 5-year estimates, there were 447 households and 392 families residing in the CDP.

=== 2010 census ===
Lake Belvedere Estates racial composition (Hispanics excluded from racial categories) (NH = Non-Hispanic)
Race	Number	Percentage
White (NH)	839	25.16%
Black or African American (NH)	1,247	37.40%
Native American or Alaska Native (NH)	4	0.12%
Asian (NH)	154	4.62%
Pacific Islander or Native Hawaiian (NH)	1	0.03%
Some Other Race (NH)	29	0.87%
Mixed/Multiracial (NH)	82	2.46%
Hispanic or Latino (any race)	978	29.33%
Total	3,334	

As of the 2010 United States census, there were 3,334 people, 974 households, and 901 families residing in the CDP.

=== 2000 census ===
As of the census of 2000, there were 1,525 people, 478 households, and 409 families residing in the CDP. The population density was 1,015.2 people/km^{2} (2,629 people/mi^{2}). There were 497 housing units at an average density of 330.8 units/km^{2} (857 units/mi^{2}). The racial makeup of the CDP was 65.70% White (55.9% were Non-Hispanic White), 26.10% African American, 0.20% Native American, 1.31% Asian, 3.74% from other races, and 2.95% from two or more races. Hispanic or Latino of any race were 14.43% of the population.

As of 2000, there were 478 households, out of which 42.5% had children under the age of 18 living with them, 64.0% were married couples living together, 15.3% had a female householder with no husband present, and 14.4% were non-families. 10.3% of all households were made up of individuals, and 2.3% had someone living alone who was 65 years of age or older. The average household size was 3.19 and the average family size was 3.39.

In 2000, in the CDP, the population was spread out, with 29.4% under the age of 18, 8.3% from 18 to 24, 31.1% from 25 to 44, 24.9% from 45 to 64, and 6.4% who were 65 years of age or older. The median age was 35 years. For every 100 females, there were 102.0 males. For every 100 females age 18 and over, there were 94.1 males.

In 2000, the median income for a household in the CDP was $45,774, and the median income for a family was $45,577. Males had a median income of $30,530 versus $27,891 for females. The per capita income for the CDP was $16,784. About 12.3% of families and 17.9% of the population were below the poverty line, including 32.3% of those under age 18 and 5.6% of those age 65 or over.

As of 2000, English was the first language for 79.89% of all residents, while Spanish made up 15.90%, and French Creole was the mother tongue for 4.20% of the population.
