= Stacy Street, Florida =

- CDP
- Interactive map of Stacy Street, Florida
- Coordinates: 26°41′52″N 80°07′31″W
- Country: United States
- State: Florida
- County: Palm Beach

Area
  - Total: 0.12 sq mi (0.31 km^{2})
  - Land: 0.12 sq mi (0.31 km^{2})
  - Water: 0 sq mi (0.00 km^{2})
- Elevation: 16 ft (4.9 m)

Population (2020)
  - Total: 978
  - Density: 8,123.5/sq mi (3,136.49/km^{2})
- Time zone: UTC-5 (Eastern (EST))
  - Summer (DST): UTC-4 (EDT)
- ZIP code: 33417
- Area codes: 561, 728
- FIPS code: 12-68487
- GNIS feature ID: 2402892

Stacy Street or Stacey Street is a census-designated place (CDP) in Palm Beach County, Florida, United States. In the 2010 and 2020 US Census, the CDP is misspelled as . It is part of the Miami metropolitan area of South Florida. The population was 978 at the 2020 US census.

== Geography ==
Stacy Street stretches west from Haverhill Road for 0.4 miles (0.64 km) to a T intersection, where North and South Stacy Streets, two dead-end streets, lead in both directions. Stacy Street Park is located at the Haverhill Road intersection, and Hope-Centennial Elementary School is near the west end.

According to the United States Census Bureau, the CDP has a total area of 0.31 km^{2} (0.12 mi^{2}), all land.

== Demographics ==
Historical population
Census	Pop.	Note	%±
2000	958		—
2010	858		−10.4%
2020	978		14.0%
U.S. Decennial Census

=== Racial and ethnic composition ===
Stacey Street CDP, Florida – Racial and ethnic composition Note: the US Census treats Hispanic/Latino as an ethnic category. This table excludes Latinos from the racial categories and assigns them to a separate category. Hispanics/Latinos may be of any race.
Race / Ethnicity (NH = Non-Hispanic)	Pop 2000	Pop 2010	Pop 2020	% 2000	% 2010	% 2020
White alone (NH)	140	70	43	14.61%	8.16%	4.40%
Black or African American alone (NH)	462	348	480	48.23%	40.56%	49.08%
Native American or Alaska Native alone (NH)	0	3	0	0.00%	0.35%	0.00%
Asian alone (NH)	6	5	1	0.63%	0.58%	0.10%
Native Hawaiian or Pacific Islander alone (NH)	0	1	0	0.00%	0.12%	0.00%
Other race alone (NH)	3	7	6	0.31%	0.82%	0.61%
Mixed race or Multiracial (NH)	22	2	8	2.30%	0.23%	0.82%
Hispanic or Latino (any race)	325	422	440	33.92%	49.18%	44.99%
Total	958	858	978	100.00%	100.00%	100.00%

=== 2020 census ===
As of the 2020 United States census, there were 978 people, 164 households, and 108 families residing in the CDP.

=== 2010 census ===
As of the 2010 United States census, there were 858 people, 300 households, and 300 families residing in the CDP.

=== 2000 census ===
As of the census of 2000, there were 958 people, 258 households, and 199 families residing in the CDP. The population density was 3,362.6/km^{2} (8,354.6/mi^{2}). There were 267 housing units at an average density of 937.2/km^{2} (2,328.5/mi^{2}). The racial makeup of the CDP was 43.01% White (14.6% were Non-Hispanic White), 50.52% African American, 0.63% Asian, 2.61% from other races, and 3.24% from two or more races. Hispanic or Latino of any race were 33.92% of the population.

In 2000, there were 258 households, out of which 56.2% had children under the age of 18 living with them, 34.5% were married couples living together, 34.9% had a female householder with no husband present, and 22.5% were non-families. 9.7% of all households were made up of individuals, and 0.4% had someone living alone who was 65 years of age or older. The average household size was 3.62 and the average family size was 3.79.

As of 2000, in the CDP, the population was spread out, with 39.2% under the age of 18, 13.4% from 18 to 24, 33.8% from 25 to 44, 10.3% from 45 to 64, and 3.2% who were 65 years of age or older. The median age was 23 years. For every 100 females, there were 111.5 males. For every 100 females age 18 and over, there were 106.4 males.

In 2000, the median income for a household in the CDP was $25,950, and the median income for a family was $26,250. Males had a median income of $19,091 versus $19,597 for females. The per capita income for the CDP was $10,449. About 28.8% of families and 35.1% of the population were below the poverty line, including 38.8% of those under age 18 and none of those age 65 or over.

As of 2000, English was the first language for 52.89% of all residents, while Spanish made up 43.01%, and French Creole was the mother tongue for 4.09% of the population.
