= Washington Park, Florida =

- CDP
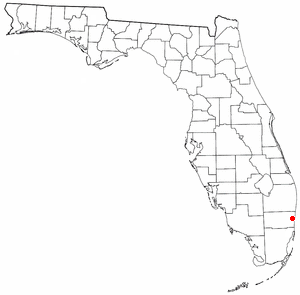
- Location of Washington Park, Florida
- Coordinates: 26°07′57″N 80°10′57″W
- Country: United States
- State: Florida
- County: Broward

Area
  - Total: 0.26 sq mi (0.67 km^{2})
  - Land: 0.26 sq mi (0.67 km^{2})
  - Water: 0 sq mi (0.00 km^{2})
- Elevation: 7 ft (2.1 m)

Population (2020)
  - Total: 1,948
  - Density: 7,518.3/sq mi (2,902.84/km^{2})
- Time zone: UTC-5 (Eastern (EST))
  - Summer (DST): UTC-4 (EDT)
- ZIP code: 33311
- Area codes: 754 and 954
- FIPS code: 12-75225
- GNIS feature ID: 2402986

Washington Park is a census-designated place (CDP) in Broward County, Florida, United States. Its population was 1,948 at the 2020 census. It is home to the African-American Research Library and Cultural Center.

== Geography ==
According to the United States Census Bureau, the CDP has a total area of 1.1 km^{2} (0.4 mi^{2}), of which 1.0 km^{2} (0.4 mi^{2}) is land and 0.1 km^{2} (0.04 mi^{2}) (4.88%) is water.

== Demographics ==
Historical population
Census	Pop.	Note	%±
1980	7,240		—
1990	6,930		−4.3%
2000	1,257		−81.9%
2010	1,672		33.0%
2020	1,948		16.5%

=== Racial and ethnic composition ===
Washington Park CDP, Florida – Racial and ethnic composition Note: the US Census treats Hispanic/Latino as an ethnic category. This table excludes Latinos from the racial categories and assigns them to a separate category. Hispanics/Latinos may be of any race.
Race / Ethnicity (NH = Non-Hispanic)	Pop 2000	Pop 2010	Pop 2020	% 2000	% 2010	% 2020
White alone (NH)	1	26	47	0.08%	1.56%	2.41%
Black or African American alone (NH)	1,229	1,581	1,737	97.77%	94.56%	89.17%
Native American or Alaska Native alone (NH)	4	0	4	0.32%	0.00%	0.21%
Asian alone (NH)	1	7	2	0.08%	0.42%	0.10%
Native Hawaiian or Pacific Islander alone (NH)	0	0	0	0.00%	0.00%	0.00%
Other race alone (NH)	0	7	10	0.00%	0.42%	0.51%
Mixed race or Multiracial (NH)	14	21	27	1.11%	1.26%	1.39%
Hispanic or Latino (any race)	8	30	121	0.64%	1.79%	6.21%
Total	1,257	1,672	1,948	100.00%	100.00%	100.00%

=== 2020 census ===
As of the 2020 census, Washington Park had a population of 1,948. The median age was 35.4 years. 28.7% of residents were under the age of 18 and 10.9% of residents were 65 years of age or older. For every 100 females there were 90.2 males, and for every 100 females age 18 and over there were 90.3 males age 18 and over.

100.0% of residents lived in urban areas, while 0.0% lived in rural areas.

There were 582 households in Washington Park, of which 43.3% had children under the age of 18 living in them. Of all households, 32.8% were married-couple households, 21.8% were households with a male householder and no spouse or partner present, and 40.7% were households with a female householder and no spouse or partner present. About 20.1% of all households were made up of individuals and 5.0% had someone living alone who was 65 years of age or older.

There were 638 housing units, of which 8.8% were vacant. The homeowner vacancy rate was 4.9% and the rental vacancy rate was 6.0%.

=== Demographic estimates ===
According to the 2020 American Community Survey 5-year estimates, there were 474 families residing in the CDP.

=== 2010 census ===
As of the 2010 United States census, there were 1,672 people, 510 households, and 388 families residing in the CDP.

=== 2000 census ===
As of the census of 2000, there were 1,257 people, 410 households, and 298 families residing in the CDP. The population density was 1,213.3/km^{2} (3,162.1/mi^{2}). There were 470 housing units at an average density of 453.7/km^{2} (1,182.3/mi^{2}). The racial makeup of the CDP was 0.08% White, 98.17% African American, 0.40% Native American, 0.08% Asian, and 1.27% from two or more races. Hispanic or Latino of any race were 0.64% of the population.

In 2000, there were 410 households, out of which 30.0% had children under the age of 18 living with them, 32.4% were married couples living together, 31.2% had a female householder with no husband present, and 27.1% were non-families. 22.0% of all households were made up of individuals, and 7.3% had someone living alone who was 65 years of age or older. The average household size was 3.07 and the average family size was 3.52.

In 2000, in the CDP, the population was spread out, with 30.8% under the age of 18, 8.4% from 18 to 24, 27.6% from 25 to 44, 21.6% from 45 to 64, and 11.7% who were 65 years of age or older. The median age was 35 years. For every 100 females, there were 89.9 males. For every 100 females age 18 and over, there were 86.3 males.

In 2000, the median income for a household in the CDP was $23,516, and the median income for a family was $26,528. Males had a median income of $21,583 versus $18,581 for females. The per capita income for the CDP was $11,359. About 24.9% of families and 28.5% of the population were below the poverty line, including 48.5% of those under age 18 and 19.5% of those age 65 or over.

As of 2000, English was the first language for 97.82% of all residents, while Spanish was the mother tongue for 2.17% of the population.
