= 2018 United States gun violence protests =

Series of protests against gun violence

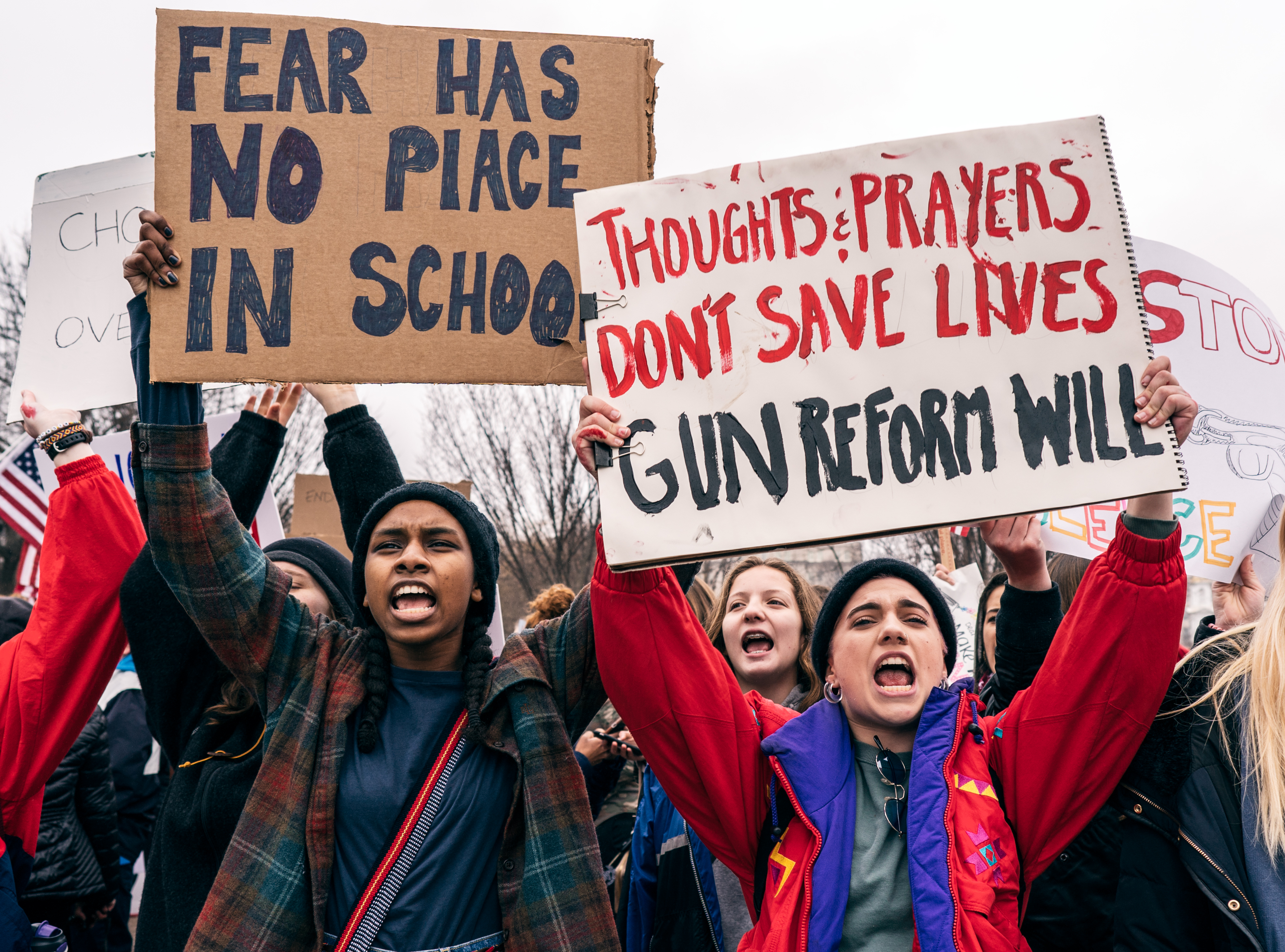
- Students protesting gun violence at the White House, February 19, 2018
- Date: February 17 – April 20, 2018
- Location: Various cities across the United States
- Caused by: Mass shootings and school shootings in the United States
- Goals: Gun violence prevention; Increased gun control
- Methods: Walkout, nonviolent protest

Lead figures
March for Our Lives: X González; David Hogg; Cameron Kasky; Jaclyn Corin; Ryan Deitsch; Sarah Chadwick; Aalayah Eastmond	Gun violence prevention organizations: Never Again MSD; Everytown for Gun Safety

In 2018, protests against gun violence in the United States increased after a series of mass shootings, most notably the Parkland High School shooting on February 14 that year. An organized protest in the form of a student-led national school walkout occurred on March 14, the one month anniversary of the shooting. March for Our Lives held a rally in Washington D.C. on March 24, and another major demonstration occurred April 20, the 19th anniversary of the Columbine High School massacre.

== Demonstrations ==
=== Rally in Fort Lauderdale, Florida ===
U.S. gun sales have risen in the 21st century, peaking in 2020 during the COVID-19 pandemic. "NICS" is the FBI's National Instant Background Check System.

The anti-gun violence group Never Again MSD, formed and led by survivors of the Stoneman Douglas High School shooting, held a rally on February 17 in Fort Lauderdale, Florida, which was attended by hundreds of students.

The Fort Lauderdale rally was followed by other protests across the country. On February 19, a group of teenagers staged a "lie-in" outside the White House. Hundreds of students marched to Marjory Stoneman Douglas High School on February 20. Students also demonstrated at Florida's Capitol. In Kansas, several hundred high school students protested on February 21.

=== March 1 NRA-sponsor boycotts ===
The students from Parkland, Florida began encouraging companies who partner with the NRA—offering perks or discounts to members—to sever ties with the organization. Over a dozen companies dropped their NRA partnership in the days following.

=== Enough! National School Walkout ===
Enough! National School Walkout
- Date: March 14, 2018
- Location: United States
- Type: Gun control advocacy
- Organised by: Women's March Youth

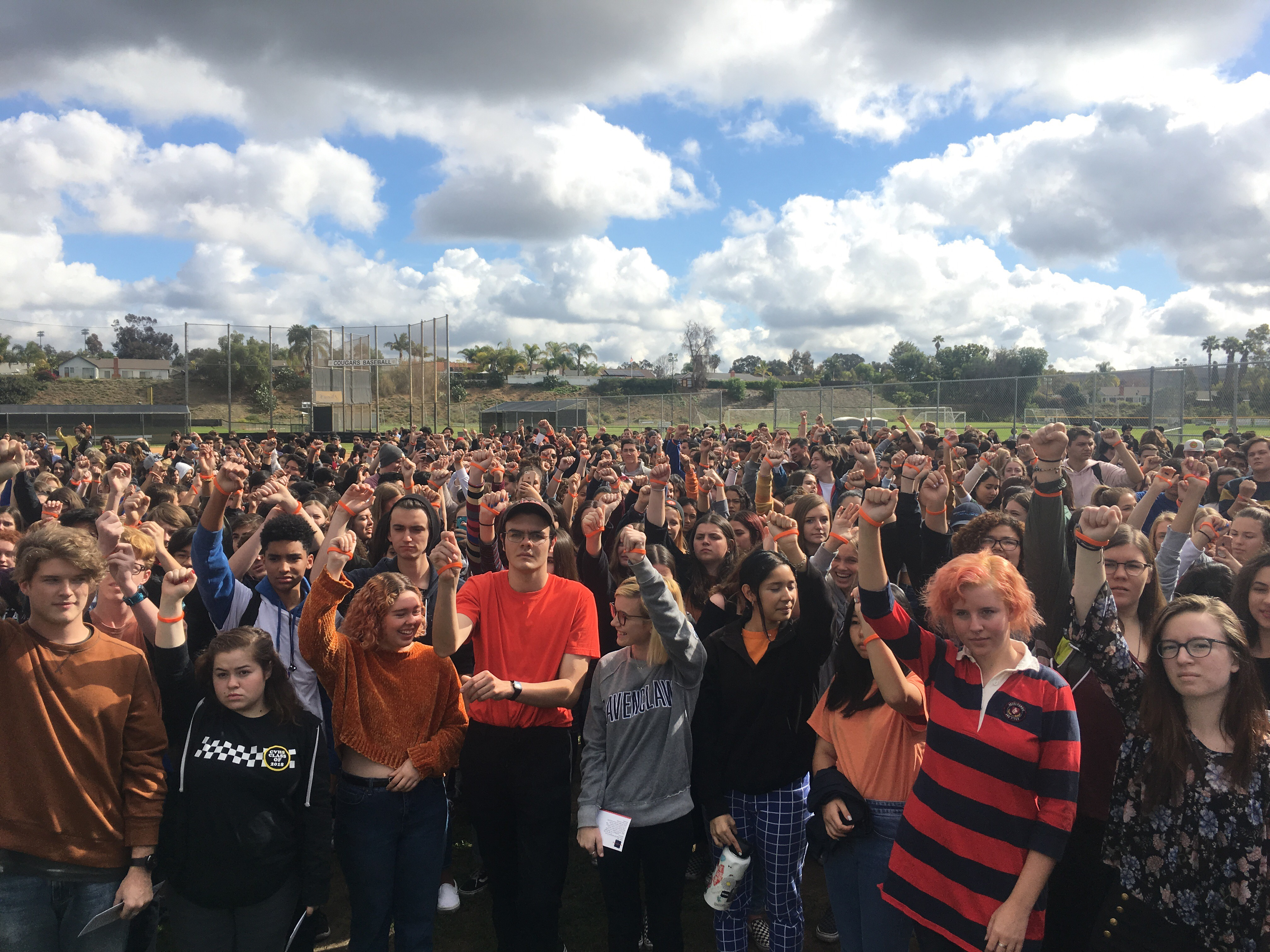
Students at Capistrano Valley High School in Mission Viejo, California raise their fists during the walkout, wearing orange wristbands symbolic of the movement

The Enough! National School Walkout was a walkout planned by organizers of the Students' March, that occurred on March 14, in response to the Stoneman Douglas High School shooting. The protest had students, parents, and gun control students leaving schools for seventeen minutes (one minute for each person who died during the shooting) starting at 10:00 a.m. in their respective time zone. The protest was held exactly one month after the Stoneman Douglas shooting. The American Civil Liberties Union (ACLU) supported the student's activism.

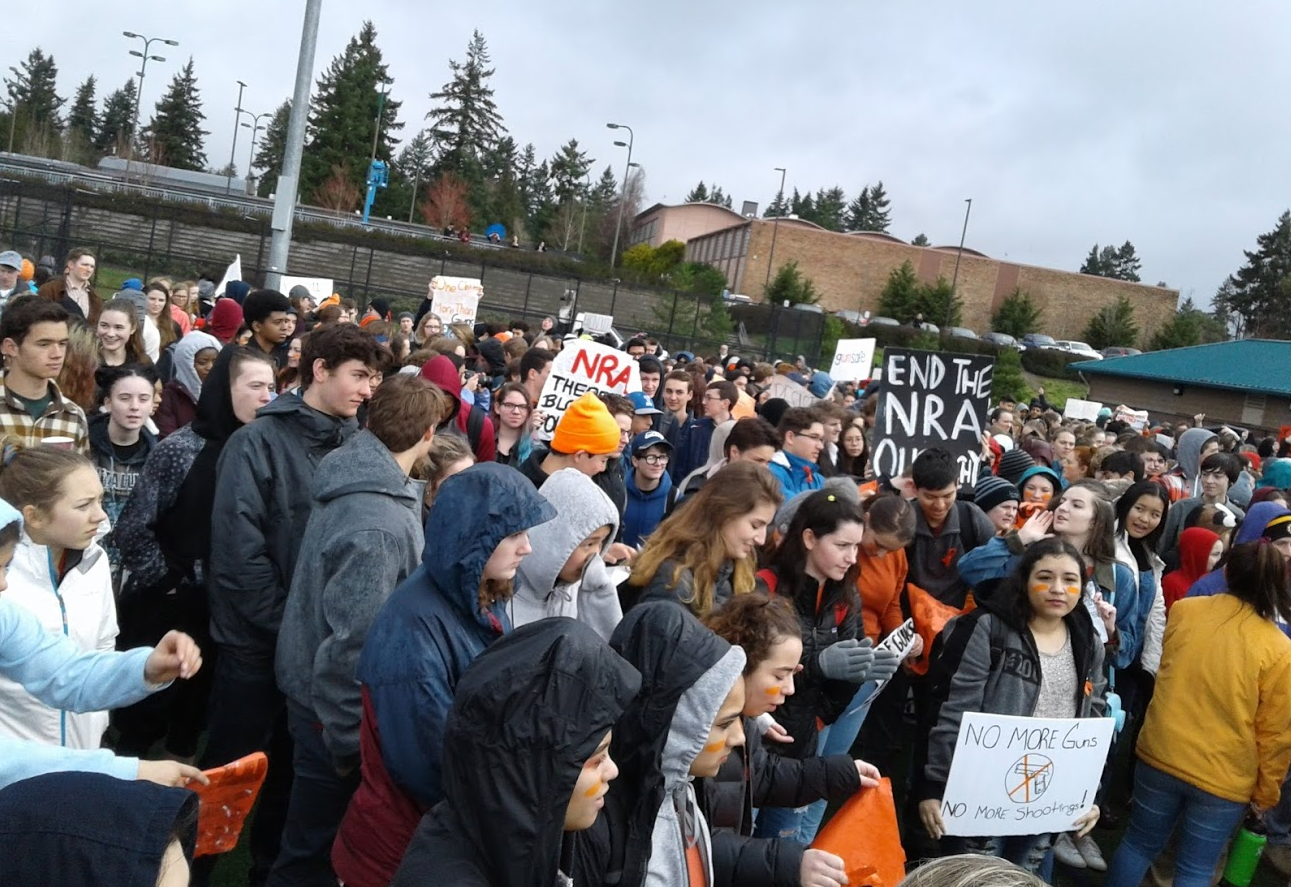
Students at Ingraham High School in Seattle launch a walkout against gun violence.

Total deaths in U.S. mass shootings since 1982—defined as four or more people shot and killed in one incident, excluding the perpetrator, at a public place, excluding gang-related killings.

An estimated 3,000 schools and nearly 1 million students participated in the protest. Thousands of students gathered in Washington, D.C., and observed 17 minutes of silence with their backs turned to the White House.

At Greenbrier High School in Greenbrier, Arkansas three students elected to receive corporal punishment in the form of two paddlings on the thighs for their participation in the walkout. This required parental consent, and was administered the same day.

Nearly 200 U.S. colleges added their names to #NeverAgain Colleges, including the Massachusetts Institute of Technology (MIT), Harvard University, Yale University, Columbia University, and the University of Florida. The colleges would not penalize high school students who face disciplinary action as a result of participating in a peaceful Never Again MSD protest.

U.S. broadcaster Viacom expressed support for the protests, including executive Shari Redstone making a $500,000 donation to March For Our Lives, and all Viacom U.S. cable networks (including MTV and Nickelodeon) suspending programming for seventeen minutes at a time at 10:00 a.m. in each time zone, in solidarity for the walkouts. The company also planned discussion and acknowledgement of the movement in programming and other output by its channels.

=== March for Our Lives ===
March for Our Lives was a student-led demonstration in support of tighter gun control that took place on March 24, 2018, in Washington, D.C., with over 800 sibling events throughout the United States and around the world. Student organizers from Never Again MSD planned the march in collaboration with the nonprofit organization Everytown for Gun Safety. The event followed the Stoneman Douglas High School shooting, which was described by many media outlets as a possible tipping point for gun control legislation.

Protesters urged for universal background checks on all gun sales, raising the federal age of gun ownership and possession to the age of 21, closing of the gun show loophole, a restoration of the 1994 Federal Assault Weapons Ban, and a ban on the sale of high-capacity magazines in the United States. Turnout was estimated to be between 1.2 and 2 million people in the United States, making it one of the largest protests in American history.

=== Northwestern Senior High School ===
On Tuesday, April 10, 2018, hundreds of students walked out of their Miami high school to protest gun violence after four current or former classmates were shot off campus. The students chanted "no justice, no peace" Tuesday and carried "enough is enough" signs outside Northwestern Senior High School. They staged the protest after the weekend shooting deaths of 17-year-old Kimson Green, a 10th-grader who was about to become a member of the National Honor Society, and 18-year-old Rickey Dixon, a former Northwestern student. Two other current or former classmates were wounded. The shooting happened Sunday at an apartment complex in the Liberty City neighborhood, which is plagued by gun violence.

=== April 20 The National School Walkout ===
The National School Walkout occurred nationally on April 20, 2018, which was the 19th anniversary of the Columbine High School massacre. The movement was founded and organized by Lane Murdock of Ridgefield High School. On the day of the walkout, student demonstrators wore safety orange and departed from over 2600 schools to push for legislative action against gun violence.

== See also ==
- Gun culture in the United States
- Gun politics in the United States
- List of protests in the 21st century
