= David Hogg =

American gun control activist (born 2000)

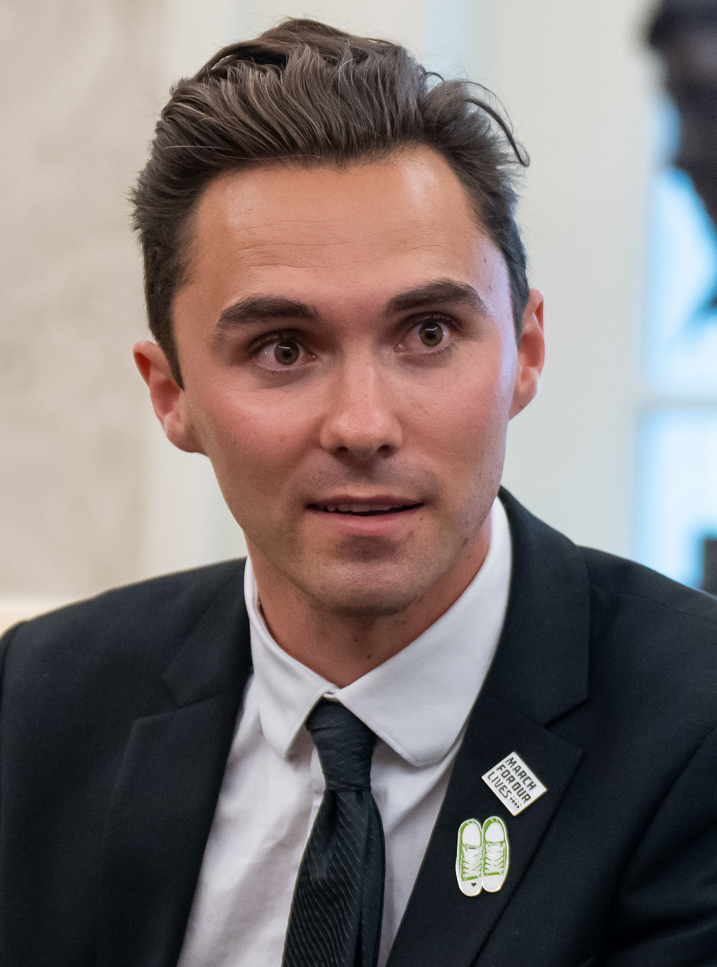
- Hogg in 2023

Vice Chair of the Democratic National Committee
- In office February 2, 2025 – June 11, 2025 Serving with Reyna Walters-Morgan, Artie Blanco, Malcolm Kenyatta, and Jane Kleeb
- Chair: Ken Martin
- Preceded by: Various

Personal details
- Born: David Miles Hogg; April 12, 2000 (age 26)
- Party: Democratic
- Relatives: Lauren Hogg (sister)
- Education: Harvard University (BA)
- Known for: Gun control advocacy; boycott of The Ingraham Angle
- Years active: 2018–present
- Organizations: Never Again MSD; March for Our Lives; Leaders We Deserve
- Notable work: #NeverAgain: A New Generation Draws the Line

David Miles Hogg (born April 12, 2000) is an American gun control activist who served as a co-vice chair of the Democratic National Committee from February to June 2025. As a student survivor of the Parkland high school shooting, he rose to prominence during the 2018 United States gun violence protests and his participation in the March for Our Lives organization, by helping lead several high-profile protests, marches, and boycotts, including the boycott of The Ingraham Angle. He has also been a target and scapegoat of several conspiracy theories.

With his sister Lauren Hogg, he wrote #NeverAgain: A New Generation Draws the Line, a book that made The New York Times Best Seller list. They pledged to donate to charity all income from the book.

In 2018, Hogg was included in the TIME 100 list of the most influential people. He is a co-founder of Good Pillow, a pillow manufacturing company, and the founder of the Leaders We Deserve PAC.

== Early life and education ==
Before attending Marjory Stoneman Douglas High School, Hogg lived in Los Angeles, California. He is the son of Kevin Hogg, a former agent of the Federal Bureau of Investigation, and Rebecca Boldrick. Born in San Diego County, California, she later worked as a teacher for Broward County Public Schools in Broward County, Florida. Kevin Hogg was assigned to the Los Angeles International Airport during his son's childhood and present during the 2013 terrorist shooting at the airport.

Hogg chose to attend Stoneman Douglas because it offered television production classes. He was a Teenlink reporter for the Sun Sentinel. He graduated on June 3, 2018. Hogg has dyslexia, attention deficit hyperactivity disorder, and post-traumatic stress disorder.

Hogg applied to seven colleges in the fall of 2017 and was accepted to three. He subsequently decided to take a gap year before starting college in order to campaign for the 2018 midterm elections.

During the next application cycle, he applied to Harvard College, among others, and was accepted. He enrolled there in the fall of 2019, and graduated in May 2023.

After the shooting, he and his family relocated to Washington, D.C.

== Parkland high school shooting ==
On February 14, 2018, Hogg was a senior at Stoneman Douglas and on campus when a 19-year-old former student of the school entered Building 12 and started shooting with a semi-automatic rifle. Hogg, who was in his AP environmental science class, told the teacher that the repeated "pop" sounds the class heard sounded like gunshots. When the fire alarm went off, Hogg and other students made an attempt to exit the building, but a janitor instructed the students to go back into the classroom. Hogg credits the janitor for saving them, as the group of students were inadvertently heading towards the shooter. A culinary arts teacher pulled Hogg and others inside her classroom and they hid in a closet.

Hogg checked social media and discovered that the shooting was occurring at his high school. He used his cell phone to record the scene in real time, to interview the other students hiding in the closet, and to leave a record in the event that they did not survive the shooting. Hogg's sister, Lauren Hogg, who was a freshman student at the time, corresponded with her brother via text message while the shooting was taking place. After about an hour, SWAT team police officers came into the classroom and escorted them out. Hogg reunited with his sister and father later that day.

== Gun control advocacy ==
=== Activism ===
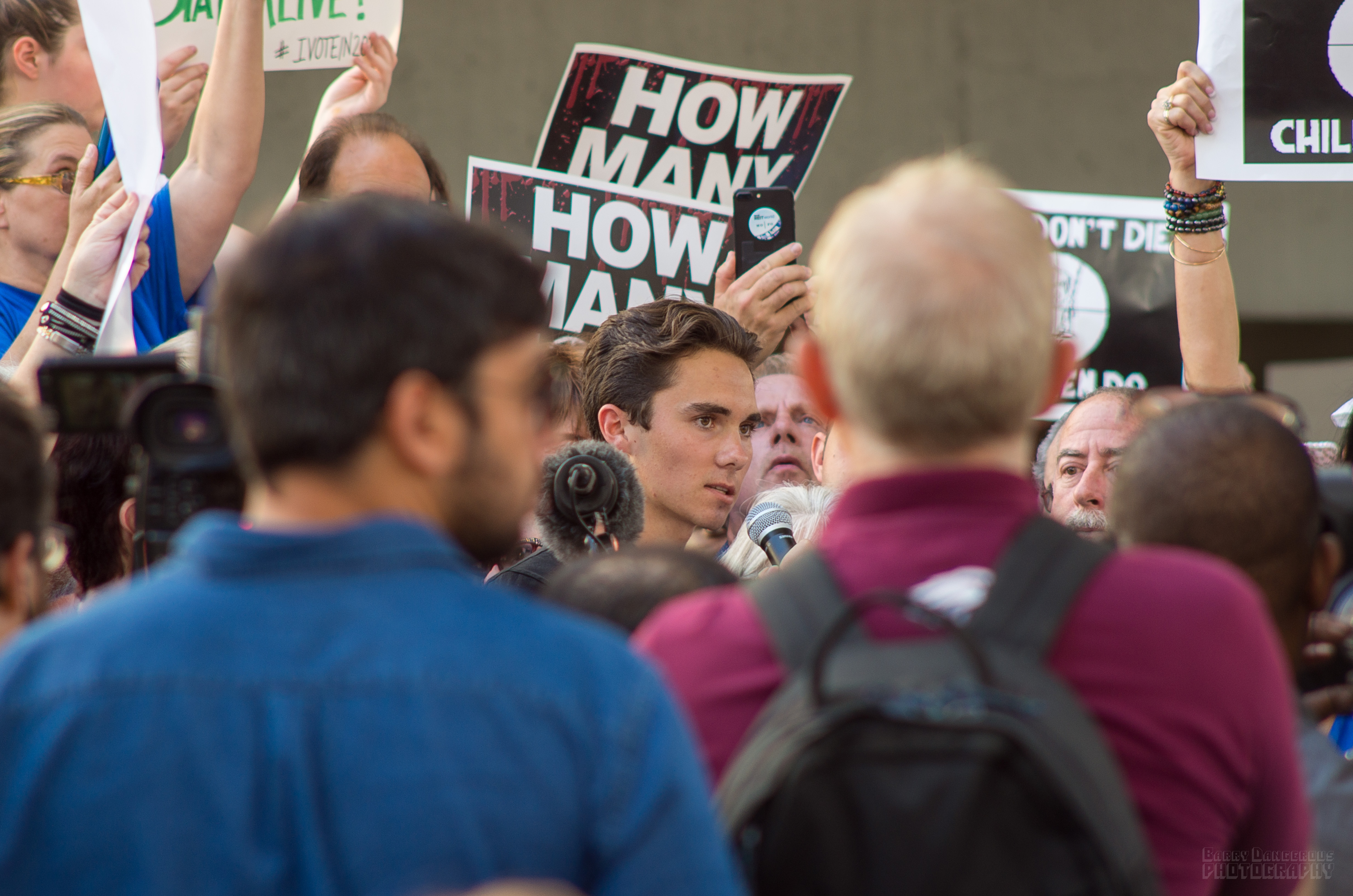
Hogg (center) speaking at a rally in Fort Lauderdale, Florida, February 17, 2018

After the school shooting, Hogg emerged as a leader in the 2018 United States gun violence protests. Along with Alfonso Calderon, Sarah Chadwick, X González, Cameron Kasky, Kyle Kashuv and other students, he turned to the media to talk about their role as survivors in the shooting and voice his opinion on gun control and gun violence. He called on elected officials to pass gun control measures and has been a vocal critic of politicians who take campaign donations from the NRA, and has urged them to compromise on legislation to save lives.

Hogg joined the social media movement and student-led gun control advocacy group Never Again MSD shortly after its formation. He flew to Los Angeles on February 21, 2018, to appear on Dr. Phil, along with his sister, to discuss the shooting. There, they met with survivors of the Columbine High School massacre. Hogg, along with González, blamed the National Rifle Association of America and the politicians to whom they donate as being complicit in school shootings. He declined to go to the White House on February 21 to meet with President Donald Trump, saying that he had to be in Tallahassee, and that Trump could come to Parkland if he wanted to talk.

David Hogg speaking at March for Our Lives

Hogg criticized the media coverage of the Parkland shooting as well as its aftermath in that Black students were not given a voice by the media; he said that his school was 25% Black but "the way we're covered doesn't reflect that".

In April 2018, Hogg initiated an effort to urge Speaker of the House Paul Ryan to bring a bill to the House of Representatives that required mandatory background checks for gun buyers; on Twitter, Hogg urged people to contact Speaker Ryan and demand a vote on universal background checks. That year, he worked to develop an anti-NRA advocacy group to encourage young people to register and vote in the 2018 midterm elections and elect candidates who promise better gun control legislation.

In May 2018, Hogg and other Never Again MSD students led a "die-in" protest at a Publix supermarket, with a mass of students lying down on the store's floor, as a rebuke of the supermarket's financial support of pro-NRA gubernatorial candidate Adam Putnam; the supermarket had contributed more than $670,000 to Putnam's campaign over three years. In addition, Hogg called on people to boycott Publix until the chain's support of Putnam stopped. As a result of the protest, Publix made a statement suspending support for Putnam.

On February 10, 2021, March for Our Lives announced that Hogg would take a leave of absence "to take some time for himself to reflect and recommit to the mission".

On July 20, 2022, Hogg interrupted a House Judiciary Committee hearing to mark up the 2021 Assault Weapons Ban and the Equal Access for Victims of Gun Violence Act. After Republican Andy Biggs from Arizona said that Americans should be armed in case there was an invasion of the southern border, Hogg shouted: "The shooter at my high school: antisemitic, anti-black and racist. The shooter in El Paso described it as an invasion" (a reference to the 2019 El Paso shooting). As he was being escorted out of the hearing room he added: "Those guns are coming from the United States of America. They aren't coming from Mexico. You are reiterating the points of a mass shooter sir".

=== Second Amendment views ===
Hogg stated that he is a supporter of the Second Amendment and supports NRA members' right to own guns legally, saying in 2018, "We're calling out the NRA a lot and 99.9 percent of the people that are in the NRA are responsible, safe gun owners and I respect them for that, joining an organization that wants to support safe gun ownership is excellent." In a 2018 interview with Fox News, he said he supported reasonable gun control such as regulations that prohibit those with mental illnesses from acquiring guns.

On February 26, 2023, Hogg stated on Twitter that the individual "has no right to a gun", but rather the Second Amendment is "about a states right to have what is today the national guard. The modern interpretation of 2A is a ridiculous fraud pushed for decades by the gun lobby." He also called for the Protection of Lawful Commerce in Arms Act (PLCAA) to be repealed, and criticized the NYSRPA v. Bruen decision.

On October 29, 2023, Hogg tweeted that "If you don't support banning semi automatic rifles you should leave the Democratic Party and join the Guns Over People party."

On November 17, 2024, Hogg lambasted outgoing Congresswoman Mary Peltola (D-AK) on Twitter, describing her as "awful on gun control" and bidding her "good riddance" following her electoral defeat.

=== Reactions and recognition ===
When Republican candidate Leslie Gibson, who was running unopposed for the Maine House of Representatives, described González as a "skinhead lesbian", and also insulted Hogg as a "bald-faced liar", Hogg called for somebody to challenge the Republican. Eryn Gilchrist, who was "horrified and embarrassed" by Gibson's comment, decided to run as a Democrat to challenge Gibson for the position, as did Republican former State Senator Thomas Martin Jr., who said Gibson's remarks did not represent the Maine Republican Party and that he planned to contact the survivors to commend their courage. Gibson dropped out of the race in response to public reaction critical of his comments.

Hogg was featured on the cover of an April 2018 edition of Time magazine, along with fellow activists Alex Wind, Jaclyn Corin, X González, and Cameron Kasky.

== Boycotts ==
Hogg called for students to boycott spring break in Florida and instead travel to Puerto Rico if gun control legislation was not passed by the Florida state government. Having finished high school in May 2018, Hogg took a gap year to campaign for politicians in favor of gun reform in the midterm elections.

Hogg initiated a boycott of companies who advertise during The Ingraham Angle. Hogg called for the boycott after television host Laura Ingraham attacked him in a tweet on March 28, 2018, about his lack of college acceptances, which Hogg characterized as cyberbullying. In response to the boycott, 24 advertisers left the show. Following the loss of advertisers, Ingraham apologized. Hogg dismissed the apology as insincere. The boycott drew mixed reactions. Ingraham was supported by Ted Nugent, Bill Maher, and by Russian bots on Twitter. Fox News continued to support Ingraham. Public polling showed that public perception of Fox News declined more than that of any advertiser. Simultaneously, Ingraham's viewership increased in the weeks following the boycott. Before, her viewership averaged 2.5 million. It jumped to 3 million when she returned after the boycott.

Hogg initiated another boycott at the same time against Sinclair Broadcast Group TV host Jamie Allman from station KDNL-TV in St. Louis. On March 26, 2018, two days before Ingraham's tweet and two weeks before Hogg's 18th birthday, Allman wrote a tweet threatening to insert a heated fire poker in the minor's anus. Two weeks after the tweet and the start of the boycott, Allman was fired and his show was canceled on April 9.

== Conspiracy theories and harassment ==
Shortly after the shooting, false claims appeared on social media claiming that the event never happened, and others accused Hogg and other students of being "crisis actors". After a series of televised interviews following the shooting, far-right figures and conspiracy theorists attacked Hogg in online media. Hogg's family received death threats from various conspiracy theorists, according to David's mother. Facebook, YouTube, and Instagram reported removing posts that attack the students or accuse them of being actors. The conspiracy theories about Hogg and other Parkland activists were named PolitiFact's 2018 Lie of the Year.

On the morning of June 5, 2018, Broward County Sheriff's Office received a false report from an anonymous caller claiming that there was a hostage situation in Hogg's family home. The harassment tactic known as swatting was described by Hogg, several media organizations, and the sheriff's department as a prank.

On March 25, 2019, future congresswoman Marjorie Taylor Greene followed Hogg down the street in Washington, D.C. for over a minute demanding to know how he was able to get media coverage and meetings with over 30 U.S. lawmakers. On two videos livestreamed to her Facebook, she called him a "coward", informed him she has a concealed-carry permit, and accused him of being a "crisis actor" paid by George Soros and others. Later in April, during an interview with the group Georgia Gun Owners, Greene referred to Hogg as "an idiot" that "is very trained, [...] like a dog". The videos resurfaced in January 2021 due to Greene herself reuploading her harassment of Hogg to her YouTube channel. During the backlash for the video, Hogg responded to Greene on Twitter, saying "how embarrassing a sitting congresswoman argues that an 18-year-old is both a more affective [sic] lobbyist and communicator than her," adding that "after surviving gun violence [Greene's behavior] is just 1/10 of 1% of the harassment advocates for gun control have to deal with."

During a June 2019 interview with the Washington Post Magazine, Hogg claimed that there had been seven attempts on his life.

== DNC Vice Chair ==
Hogg announced on December 16, 2024, the launch of his campaign for vice chair of the Democratic National Committee, stating that he would focus on "winning back young voters who have drifted from the Democratic Party to Republicans". In the elections held on February 1, 2025, Hogg won the fourth of five vice chair positions after Reyna Walters-Morgan (the Vice Chair for Civic Engagement and Voter Participation), Artie Blanco, and Malcolm Kenyatta.

In April 2025, it was reported that Hogg and Democratic National Committee leaders had clashed over Hogg's support, through his PAC, Leaders We Deserve, of primary challengers to Democrats who Hogg believed had been "asleep at the wheel." DNC Chair Ken Martin announced he would propose changes to the DNC rules that would mandate its officers to remain neutral in all Democratic primaries, not just the presidential primary overseen by the committee. Hogg responded that he would "fight to remain in his position," though would be willing to lose his leadership position through the process. In mid-May 2025, Hogg reportedly pitched a compromise plan to Martin, in which he would remain Vice Chair but be restricted from accessing internal DNC information about congressional and state legislative races as long as he was supporting challengers. Martin rejected the compromise. Later on May 12, 2025, the DNC's Credentials Committee recommended voiding the results of Hogg's and Malcolm Kenyatta's elections as vice-chairs, citing a violation of DNC rules requiring gender diversity for party officers. An election to decide whether or not to redo the DNC's previous election was held from June 9 to June 11, 2025. On June 11, 2025, DNC members voted to vacate the previous election of DNC vice chair. Hogg stated he would not run again for vice chair after the party removed him and Kenyatta from office.

== Other political activity ==
In August 2018, Hogg announced that he was planning on running to become a member of the United States House of Representatives when he turned 25 years old (due to age of qualification in the Constitution).

Following the January 6 United States Capitol attack, Hogg tweeted, "They can put up all the fencing around the capitol the real threats of @mtgreenee and @laurenboebert will still be inside until @GOPLeader takes a stand." Congresswoman Lauren Boebert retorted, "Give your keyboard a rest, child." A video of Marjorie Taylor Greene harassing Hogg in 2019 (prior to her election to Congress) went viral in that month.

In August 2023, Hogg founded Leaders We Deserve PAC to "help young, progressive candidates around the country get elected to state legislatures and the U.S. Congress".

== Business venture ==
In February 2021, Hogg announced that he and progressive tech entrepreneur William LeGate would start a company to compete with MyPillow, whose CEO Mike Lindell has spread unsubstantiated claims of voter fraud as a staunch supporter of former President Trump. Hogg announced the new venture in a series of tweets. The company name was later announced as Good Pillow. In early April 2021, Hogg announced in another series of tweets that he had resigned, released all his interest in the company to LeGate, and was leaving the venture.

== Publications ==
- with Hogg, Lauren (2018). #NeverAgain: A New Generation Draws the Line. Random House/PRH. ISBN 978-1-9848-0187-6.
- The March for Our Lives Founders (2018). Glimmer of Hope: How Tragedy Sparked a Movement (contributor). Razorbill/Penguin/PRH. ISBN 9781984836403.
