= Alfonso Calderon (activist) =

Spanish-American activist against gun violence

Alfonso Calderón
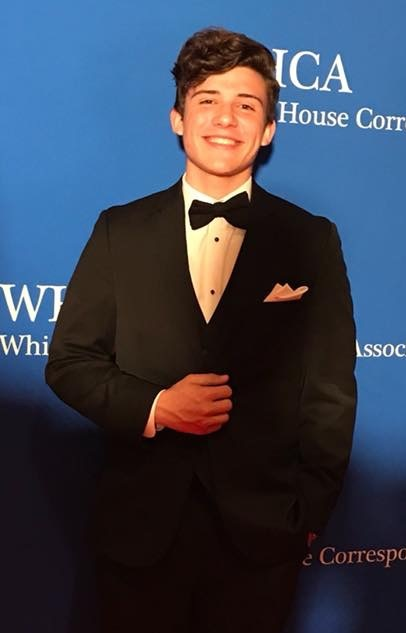
- Calderon at the 2018 White House Correspondents' Dinner
- Born: Alfonso Calderón Atienzar; October 10, 2001 (age 25); Alcobendas, Madrid, Spain
- Education: Marjory Stoneman Douglas High School (–2019); American University (2019–)
- Occupations: Student, activist
- Years active: 2018–present
- Known for: Advocacy against gun violence

Alfonso Calderón Atienzar (Note: In this Spanish name, the first or paternal surname is Calderón and the second or maternal family name is Atienzar.) (born October 10, 2001) is a Spanish-American student activist against gun violence. He is a survivor of the Stoneman Douglas High School shooting and a founding member of the Never Again MSD movement.

== Early life ==
Calderon was born in a Spanish town outside Madrid called Alcobendas, and he has been living in the United States since 2008.

== Parkland shooting ==
On February 14, 2018, 17 students and staff members of Marjory Stoneman Douglas High School were killed and 17 others were injured in a mass shooting. At the time, it was the deadliest school shooting in U.S. history.

During the school shooting, Calderon was locked in a closet with fellow students for three to four hours.

I was in a closet, locked for four hours with people who I would consider almost family, crying and weeping on me, begging for their lives. I understand what it's like to text my parents, 'Goodbye, I might never ever, ever get to see you again. I love you.' I understand what it's like to fear for your life.

— Alfonso Calderon, February 22, 2018

At the time of the shooting, Calderon was 16 years old and junior at the high school.

== Activism ==
Four days after the shooting, Calderon and others had co-founded an activist movement they named "Never Again", which advocates for stricter background checks prior to gun purchases.

Calderon was one of the surviving students interviewed by Lulu Garcia-Navarro of NPR that same night. He spoke about how he wanted things to change with legislation to prevent similar shootings in the future. He mentioned that the 19 year old shooter was able to purchase an AR-15, the weapon used in the shooting.

The movement utilized the hashtag "#Neveragain" on social media to draw attention to messaging and scheduled protests, first emerging after a rally held by students in Tallahassee, Florida on February 21. Calderon spoke about his experiences at the rally for approximately six minutes.

Calderon criticized lawmakers for failing to enact sensible gun laws as well as screenings to keep mentally ill people from being able to buy "military grade weapons", and he criticized the National Rifle Association (NRA) and their spokesperson Dana Loesch for encouraging gun proliferation as well as politicians funded by the NRA. He said that student voices were not being taken seriously enough. He described a proposal of arming teachers to further school safety as a "terrible idea", explaining that teachers were never meant to carry lethal weapons. He views his advocacy as more than merely protecting Parkland students but as an effort to save human lives in general. He believes that it is up to the electorate to vote out politicians who support lax gun regulations and the NRA.

== See also ==
- David Hogg
- Cameron Kasky
