= Never Again MSD =

American activist organization

- Formation: February 15, 2018; 8 years ago
- Purpose: Gun control advocacy after the shooting at the Marjory Stoneman Douglas High School (MSD) in 2018
- Location: Marjory Stoneman Douglas High School, Parkland, Florida
- Key people: Alfonso Calderon; Sarah Chadwick; Jaclyn Corin; Matt Deitsch; Ryan Deitsch; Sam Deitsch; X González; David Hogg; Cameron Kasky; Alex Wind

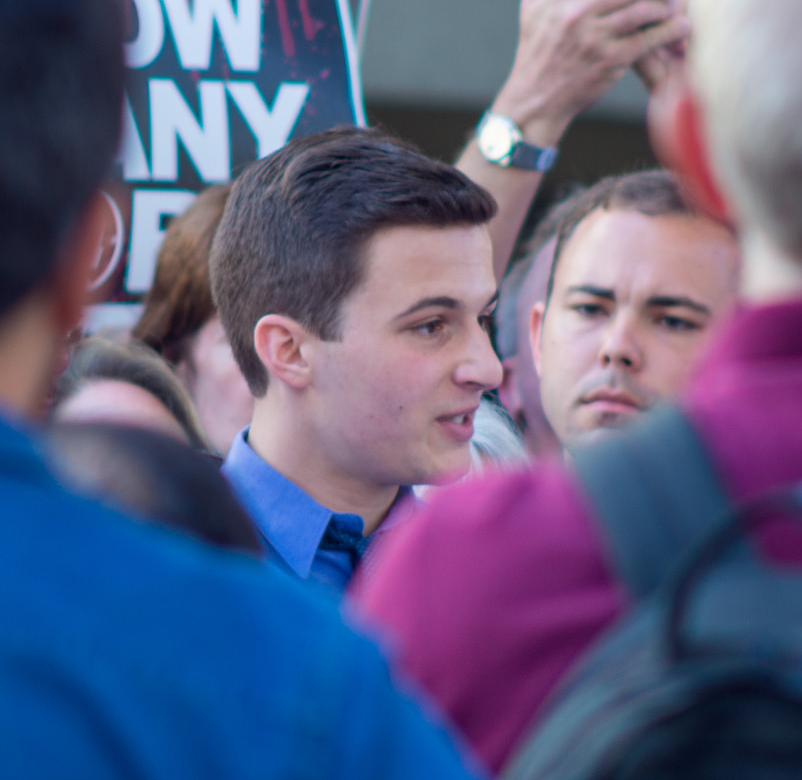
Cameron Kasky (center) at a rally in Fort Lauderdale, Florida, on February 17, 2018

Never Again MSD is an American student-led political action committee for gun control that advocates for tighter regulations to prevent gun violence. The organization, also known by the Twitter hashtags #NeverAgain, and #EnoughIsEnough, was formed by a group of twenty students attending Marjory Stoneman Douglas High School (MSD) in Parkland, Florida, at the time of the deadly shooting in 2018, in which seventeen students and staff members were killed by gunman Nikolas Cruz, who was a 19-year-old former student of the school armed with an AR-15 style semi-automatic rifle. The organization started on social media as a movement "for survivors of the Stoneman Douglas Shooting, by survivors of the Stoneman Douglas Shooting" using the hashtag #NeverAgain. A main goal of the group was to influence that year's United States mid-term elections, and they embarked on a multi-city bus tour to encourage young people to register to vote.

The organization staged protests demanding legislative action to be taken to prevent similar shootings in the future and has vocally condemned U.S. lawmakers who have received political contributions from the National Rifle Association (NRA). It was credited in The Washington Post as winning a "stunning victory" against the NRA in the Florida legislature in March 2018 when both houses voted for various gun control measures. The law increased funding for school security and raised the required age to buy a gun from 18 to 21.

Among the organization's most prominent members are Alfonso Calderon, Sarah Chadwick, Jaclyn Corin, Ryan Deitsch, X González, David Hogg, Cameron Kasky, and Alex Wind. Corin, González, Hogg, Kasky, and Wind were featured on a cover of Time in March 2018. In December later that year, it was announced that the March for Our Lives activists made the shortlist for Time's Person of the Year at number four.

== Founding ==
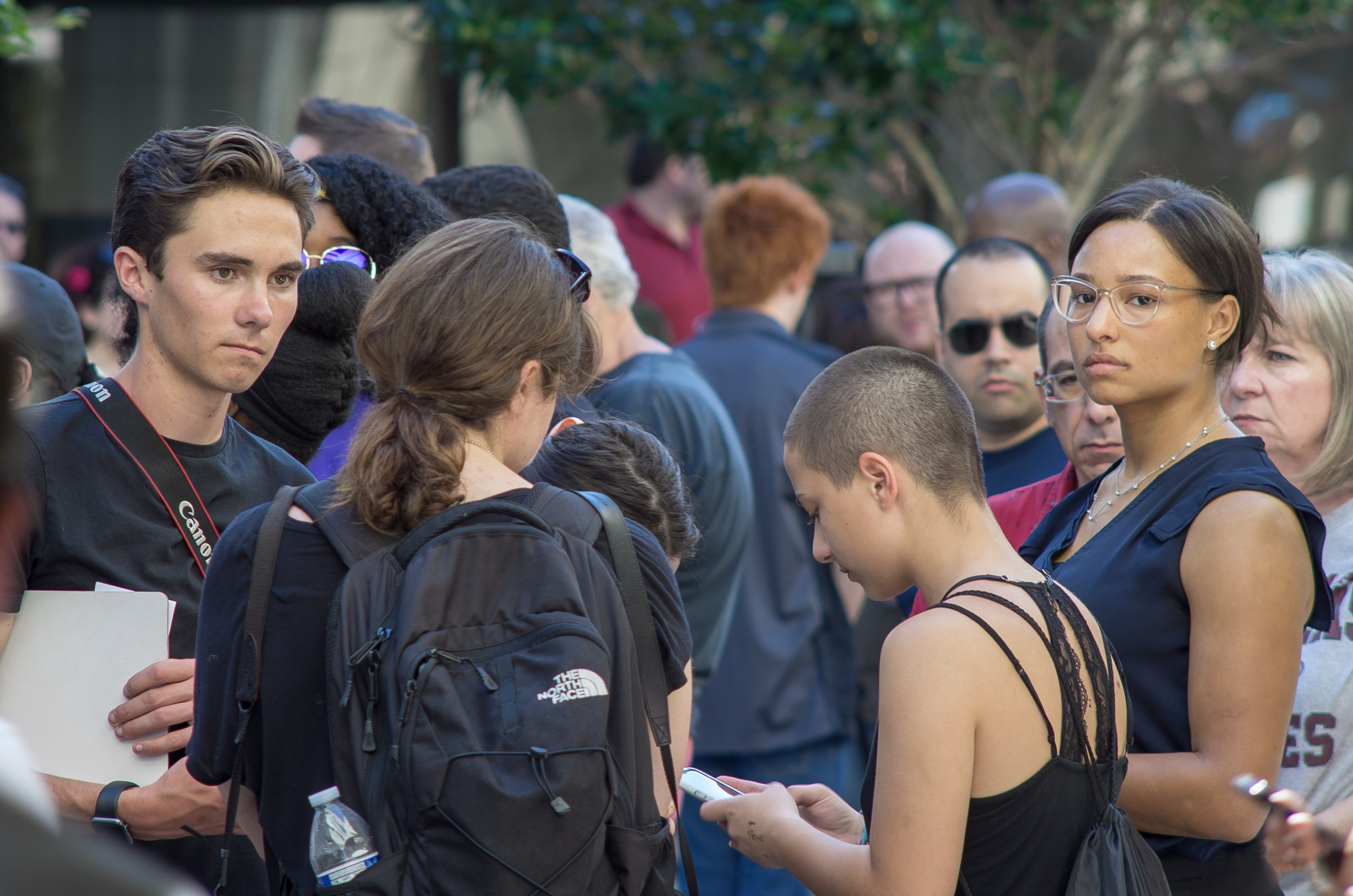
David Hogg (far left) and X González (second to right) at a rally in Fort Lauderdale, Florida on February 17, 2018

The group was co-formed by Cameron Kasky and his friends at the Marjory Stoneman Douglas High School in the first four days after the shooting, which was committed by gunman Nikolas Cruz, who was a 19-year-old former student of the school armed with an AR-15 style semi-automatic rifle.

The initial three co-founders were Kasky, Alex Wind, and Sofie Whitney. On February 15, 2018, one day after the shooting, Kasky met with Wind at a candlelight vigil. Wind stated, "The day after the shooting, we said something needs to happen; there needs to be a central space; there needs to be a movement." After the vigil, Kasky invited Wind and Whitney to his house. Kasky came up with the name "Never Again" while the group stayed up through the night to make plans, and he posted "Stay alert. #NeverAgain" to Facebook.

Over the next three days after the shooting, the group gained over 35,000 followers on Facebook. Kasky recruited other Stoneman Douglas students David Hogg, X González, and Delaney Tarr at a gun-control rally in Fort Lauderdale, Florida, where they spoke; other students quickly joined. The students gave as many interviews as they could to television networks. The group said they worked quickly to take advantage of the national media attention given to the shooting and its aftermath. Numerous Stoneman Douglas students have been shown in media coverage. By the next day, the group had created Twitter accounts and announced a March for Our Lives nationwide protest, for March 24, 2018.

Stoneman Douglas teacher Ivy Schamis, who had been teaching her Holocaust History class about combating hate when Cruz fired shots into her classroom, stated she thought the Stoneman Douglas students' #NeverAgain hashtag was inspired by the class on Holocaust history. In the classroom there had been a banner saying "We Will Never Forget", which a Holocaust survivor had given to Schamis. Kelly Plaur, a student survivor from that class, is the great-granddaughter of an Auschwitz survivor. Plaur protected Schamis during the shooting. According to Schamis, Cruz was unaware he was shooting into a class on the Holocaust, even though he'd scrawled a swastika onto one of his ammunition magazines. Schamis was presented with USC Shoah Foundation’s inaugural Stronger Than Hate Educator Award in 2019. During her acceptance speech at the award ceremony, Schamis honored the two students Nicholas Dworet and Helena Ramsay from her class that were killed during the shooting. Schamis added, "We share our stories in the hope that others understand that hate is not OK, it's never OK."

== Activism ==
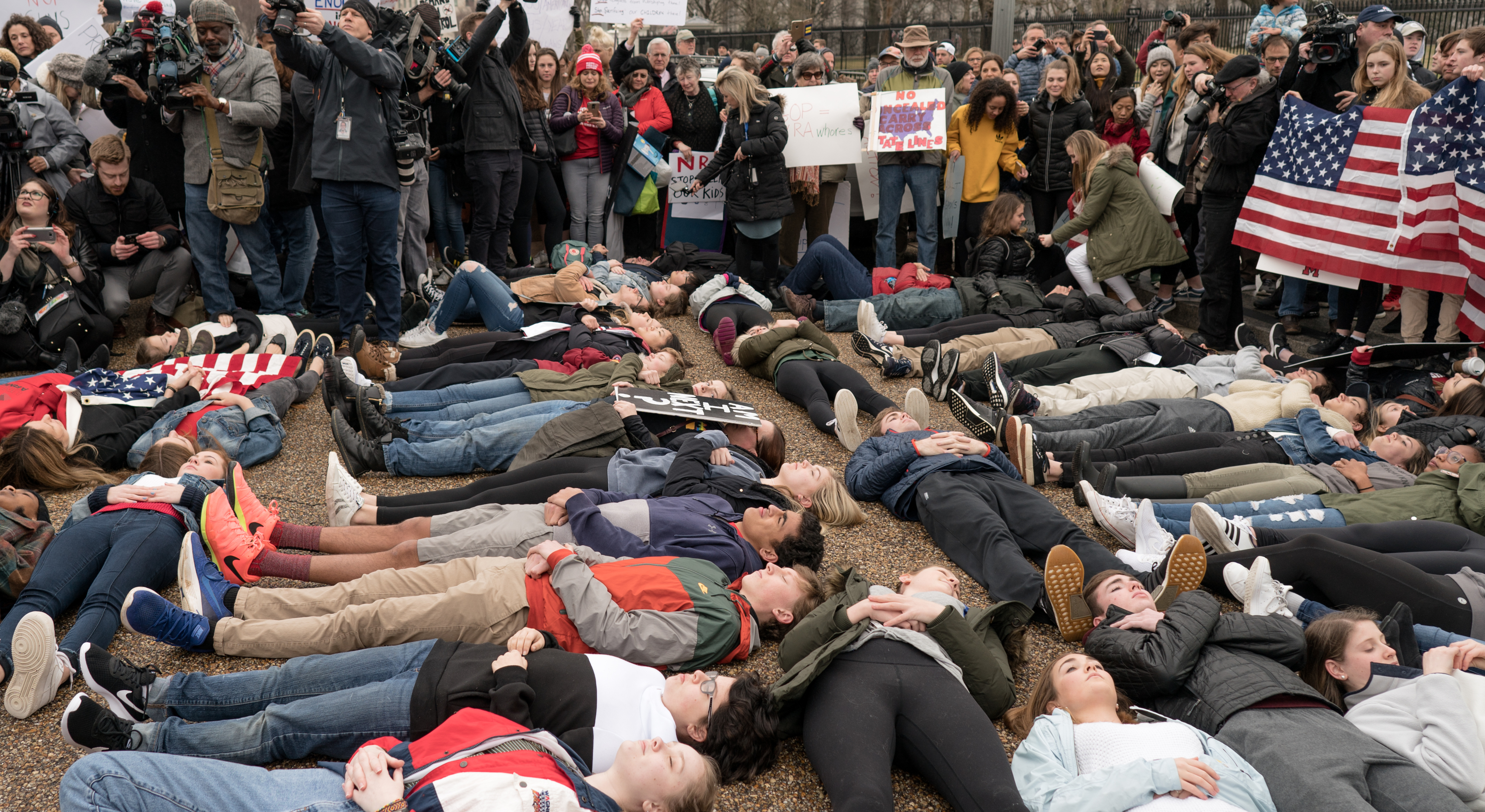
Never Again MSD has inspired students from across the country to protest the nation's gun laws. Photo: a student "lie-in" at the White House on February 19, 2018.

The Fort Lauderdale gun control rally at Broward County Federal Courthouse on February 17, 2018 was attended by hundreds of supporters. Elected officials and gun control advocates, including Florida senator Gary Farmer, called for an increase in firearm restrictions and gun control legislation. At this rally, X González began their speech with a moment of silence for the 17 victims killed in the school shooting. They then gave an impassioned 11-minute speech, in which they demanded to know where the "common sense" was in America's gun laws, calling out members of Congress who have accepted contributions from the NRA. González was noted for rebuking "thoughts and prayers" from the government and President Donald Trump.

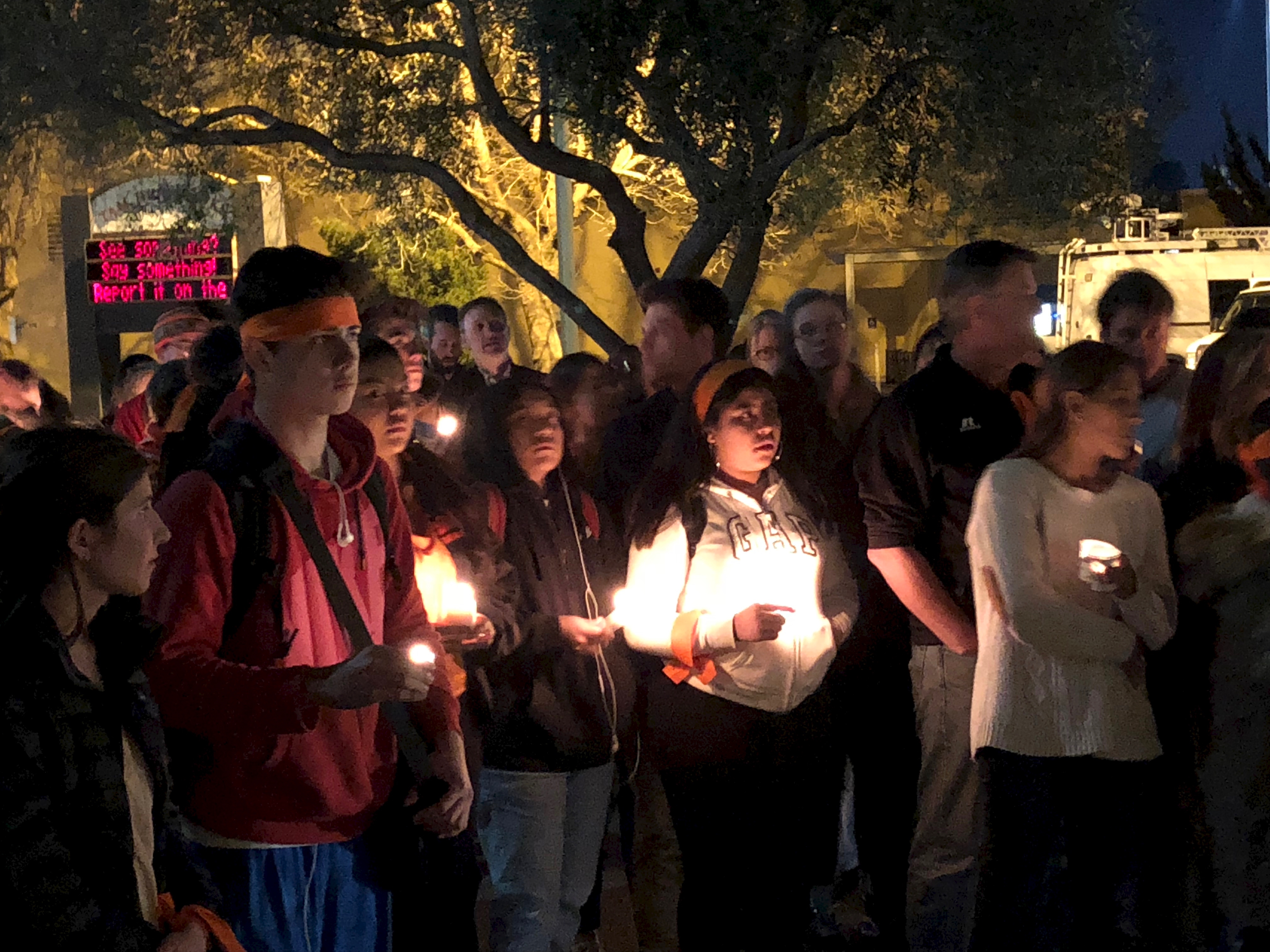
Never Again MSD has inspired vigils to protest gun violence and discuss reforms. Image: students of Tamalpais High School in Mill Valley, California.

To support the gun control rally, Never Again MSD spoke out in the media about the importance of taking action to change policy. In an opinion column for CNN, Cameron Kasky wrote: "We can't ignore the issues of gun control that this tragedy raises. And so, I'm asking—no, demanding—we take action now." Delaney Tarr wrote an op-ed for Teen Vogue, in which she discussed why she and her fellow students were organizing in response to the mass shooting at Parkland. She stated "Knowing that we can keep this from happening to even one more person is the only thing that makes me feel even a little bit better about living through this senseless tragedy.”

The first organized #NeverAgain movement protest was a march on the Florida State Capitol in Tallahassee on February 20, 2018. The group worked with congresswoman Debbie Wasserman Schultz and Florida senator Lauren Book to arrange a bus trip for one hundred students and fifteen parent chaperones to the Capitol to voice their concerns with lawmakers and demand action on gun violence. Jaclyn Corin was a key organizer of the bus trip protest. A report in Vanity Fair suggested it was her idea to have the bus trip soon after the shooting because it was alive in the news cycle; she said "the news forgets—very quickly—we needed a critical mass event." Sofie Whitney, one of the organizers of the bus trip, was interviewed by CNN's Chief Washington Correspondent Jake Tapper while on the bus en route. Several students, along with Fred Guttenberg, father of a slain student, watched from the gallery as the Florida House voted against considering a bill to ban assault weapons (such as AR-15 style rifles) and high-capacity magazines in a vote of 71 to 36. More than 3,000 people attended a rally at the Capitol the following day.

Never Again MSD and other groups have also played a part in corporations' revocation of NRA sponsorships and discounts for NRA members. Firms which have severed ties with the NRA include the First National Bank of Omaha; car rental companies Hertz, Avis, Enterprise, and Budget; insurer MetLife; Symantec software; home security firm SimpliSafe; and airlines including Delta and United.

Never Again MSD has been credited for including persons of color within their movement. Jaclyn Corin recognized that "Parkland received more attention because of its affluence," while David Hogg faulted the media for "not giving black students a voice." Alex Wind said the protests were about ending gun violence against all communities.

=== March for Our Lives ===
March for Our Lives, a nationwide demonstration that included a march held in Washington, D.C., took place on March 24, 2018. The event was conducted in collaboration with the nonprofit organization Everytown for Gun Safety. Hundreds of thousands of protesters showed up at demonstrations across the United States, as well as internationally, to demand action against gun violence. Many Marjory Stoneman Douglas students spoke out in Washington, D.C. González briefly spoke, naming the victims, before standing silent on stage for four minutes. They were on stage for six minutes and twenty seconds, the length of the Parkland shooting.

Yolanda Renee King, Martin Luther King Jr.'s nine-year-old granddaughter brought in by Corin, said during her speech, "I have a dream that enough is enough." In addition to sharing the stage at the protest with King, they also passed the mic to Virginia African-American elementary school student Naomi Wadler. Sir Paul McCartney, speaking to CNN at a sister march in New York City, revealed his T-shirt reading "We can end gun violence."

=== Town halls ===
Never Again MSD has worked to organize town hall meetings across the United States to hold Congress members accountable for their position on gun laws. For town halls on April 7, 2018, the group confirmed events in 30 districts. At a town hall near Parkland, supporters passed out red bumper stickers calling for an assault weapons ban.

=== Cross–country gun control tour ===
In June 2018, Never Again MSD announced that the group would travel throughout the United States and hold rallies that summer to call for stronger gun control, and to encourage teenagers who would be eighteen by November 2018 to vote in the 2018 U.S. midterm elections on a tour entitled "Road To Change Tour". The group stated that it intended to appear in cities where the NRA held the most influence. During the summer and fall, the students traveled to every district in Florida and 30 states across the country, visiting over 100 communities, registering 50,000 voters, and raising awareness about gun violence. In the weeks before the 2018 U.S. midterm elections, the group engaged in another national tour specifically focused on election-related efforts like educating, registering, and encouraging youth voters to vote in the 2018 U.S. midterm elections.

== Response ==
George and Amal Clooney donated $500,000 to the organization to help with the cost of organizing the March for Our Lives demonstration, which they also participated in. Following the Clooneys' announcement, other celebrities including Oprah Winfrey, Jeffrey Katzenberg, and Steven Spielberg pledged to match the $500,000 donation.

In a CNN editorial entitled "The NRA's worst nightmare is here", Dean Obeidallah compared Never Again MSD to the "early days of the #MeToo movement, which caused a cultural shift regarding sexual misconduct."

After some schools threatened to suspend students for participating in peaceful Never Again MSD (#NeverAgain) protests, hundreds of U.S. colleges pledged they would not penalize students disciplined for taking part. These colleges, including the Massachusetts Institute of Technology (MIT), Harvard University, Yale University, Columbia University, and the University of Florida, added their names to #NeverAgain Colleges.

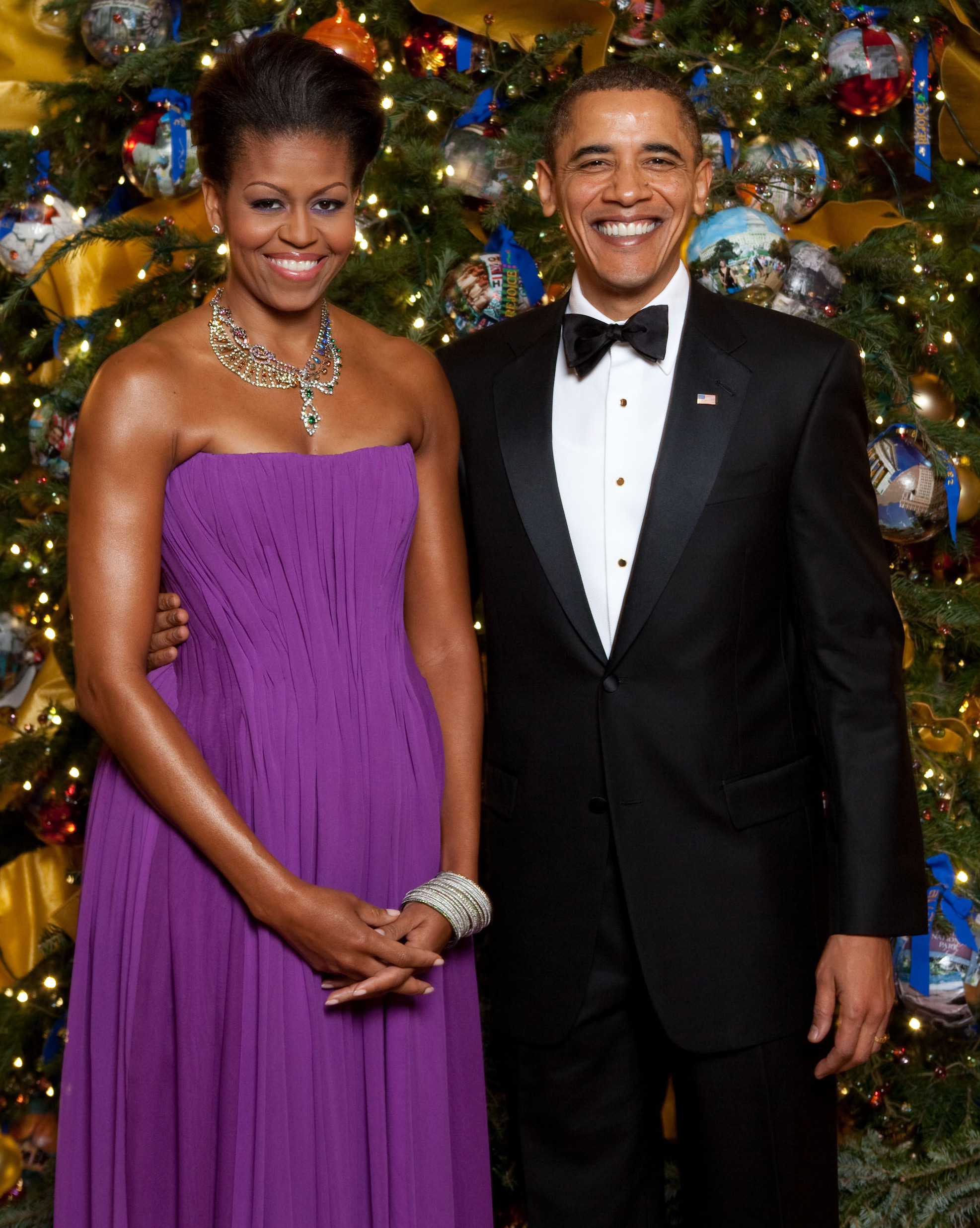
Michelle and Barack Obama penned a letter of support to the Parkland students, ending their letter with "we will be there for you."

In March 2018, Michelle and Barack Obama penned a handwritten letter to the students of Parkland, expressing admiration for their advocacy against gun violence:

We wanted to let you know how inspired we have been by the resilience, resolve and solidarity that you have all shown in the wake of unspeakable tragedy ... Not only have you supported and comforted each other, but you've helped awaken the conscience of the nation, and challenged decision-makers to make the safety of our children the country's top priority. ... Throughout our history, young people like you have led the way in making America better.

— Michelle and Barack Obama, March 10, 2018

=== Misinformation and criticism ===
Attempts to discredit the Never Again MSD movement in the media took the form of verbal attacks and misinformation by right-wing Republican leaders. Former Republican senator and presidential candidate Rick Santorum attacked the Parkland activists verbally during an interview with CNN, suggesting that students should take classes in CPR rather than marching in Washington. The Washington Post quoted several doctors ridiculing Santorum for suggesting CPR, which is useless for trauma and blood loss. Leslie Gibson, a Republican candidate for the Maine House of Representatives, disparaged X González and David Hogg, but later apologized for his comments and withdrew his candidacy. Iowa Republican Representative Steve King's campaign criticized X González for displaying their Cuban heritage.

NRA board member and rock musician Ted Nugent described the Parkland activists as "mushy brained and soulless liars". Alex Jones, a right-wing conspiracy theorist and host of InfoWars, led a campaign to discredit X González, David Hogg, and other March for Our Lives protesters by comparing them to Nazis.

Fake pictures and GIFs of X González tearing up a copy of the U.S. Constitution circulated on social media in March 2018. The images were doctored from originals of González tearing up a shooting target sign. Actor and conservative commentator Adam Baldwin defended circulating the doctored images as political satire.

=== New laws ===
In March 2018, the Florida Legislature passed a bill titled the Marjory Stoneman Douglas High School Public Safety Act. It raised the minimum age for buying firearms to 21, established waiting periods and background checks, provided a program for the arming of some teachers and the hiring of school police, banned bump stocks, and barred potentially violent or mentally unhealthy people arrested under certain laws from possessing guns. In all, it allocated around $400 million.

Governor Rick Scott signed the bill into law on March 9. He commented, "To the students of Marjory Stoneman Douglas High School, you made your voices heard. You didn't let up and you fought until there was change." John Cassidy stated in The New Yorker, "This was the first time in thirty years that Florida had passed any gun restrictions, and it was a direct response to the Never Again movement, which was founded by students from Marjory Stoneman Douglas High School."

Salon suggested that Republican lawmakers have generally remained silent about gun control measures because "they depend heavily on NRA campaign donations, and even more on the NRA's cadre of pro-gun voters". Since February 2018, 67 new pieces of gun control legislation have been passed in 26 states across the country.

== Controversy ==
In an open letter published on their website, March For Our Lives admitted to "[tokenizing] the BIPOC communities we aimed to create relationships with." Particularly on their Road to Change tour of the summer of 2018. This tour saw many minority activists, some having spoken at the March For Our Lives, join them on their travels.

Some early gatekeepers of March For Our Lives, students and adults alike, did not give Black Parkland students and other BIPOC activists from across the nation a fair opportunity to build an inclusive movement based on lived experience and solidarity. That summer, in an effort to listen and learn from marginalized communities, March For Our Lives traveled across the country, from Florida to California, but further tokenized the BIPOC communities we aimed to create relationships with.

"Open Letter From March for Our Lives".
