= X González =

American activist and gun control advocate

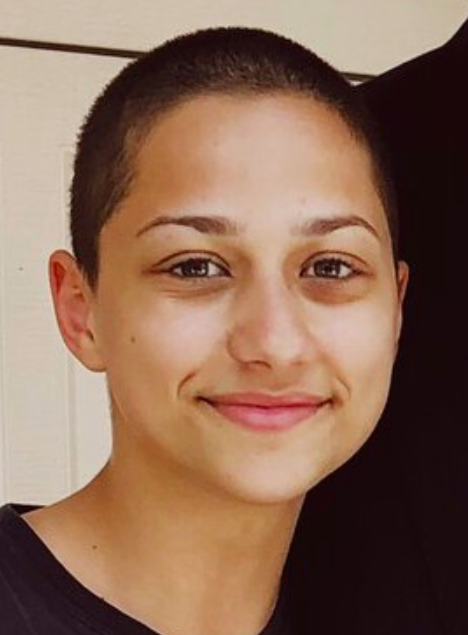
- González in 2018
- Born: Emma González; November 11, 1999 (age 27); Florida, U.S.
- Education: Marjory Stoneman Douglas High School; New College of Florida (BA)
- Occupation: Activist
- Years active: 2018–present

X González (born Emma González; November 11, 1999) is an American activist and advocate for gun control. In 2018, they survived the Stoneman Douglas High School shooting, the deadliest high school shooting in U.S. history, and, in response, co-founded the gun-control advocacy group Never Again MSD.

González gave a viral speech against gun violence, proclaiming "We call B.S." on the lack of action by politicians funded by the NRA. Subsequently, González continued to be an outspoken activist on gun control, making high-profile media appearances and helping organize the March for Our Lives. Speaking at the demonstration, González led a moment of silence for the victims of the massacre; they stood on stage for six minutes, which they observed was the length of the shooting spree itself.

González was included in Time magazine's 100 Most Influential People of 2018.

== Early life and education ==
González was raised in Parkland, Florida, a suburb of the Miami metropolitan area. Their mother is a mathematics tutor and their father is a cybersecurity attorney who immigrated from Cuba to New York City in 1968. Gonzalez reportedly has two older siblings.

González graduated from Marjory Stoneman Douglas High School in 2018. They served as the president of its gay–straight alliance. In high school, González was also the tracking team leader on Project Aquila, a mission to send a school-made weather balloon "to the edge of space"; the project was documented by fellow student David Hogg. They enjoy creative writing and astronomy but not mathematics.

On the day of the shooting, González was in the auditorium with dozens of other students when the fire alarm went off. They attempted to exit through the hallway but were told to take cover and took refuge back in the auditorium, where they were held for two hours until police let students out.

In the spring of 2022, González graduated with a Bachelor of Arts degree from New College of Florida.

== Advocacy ==
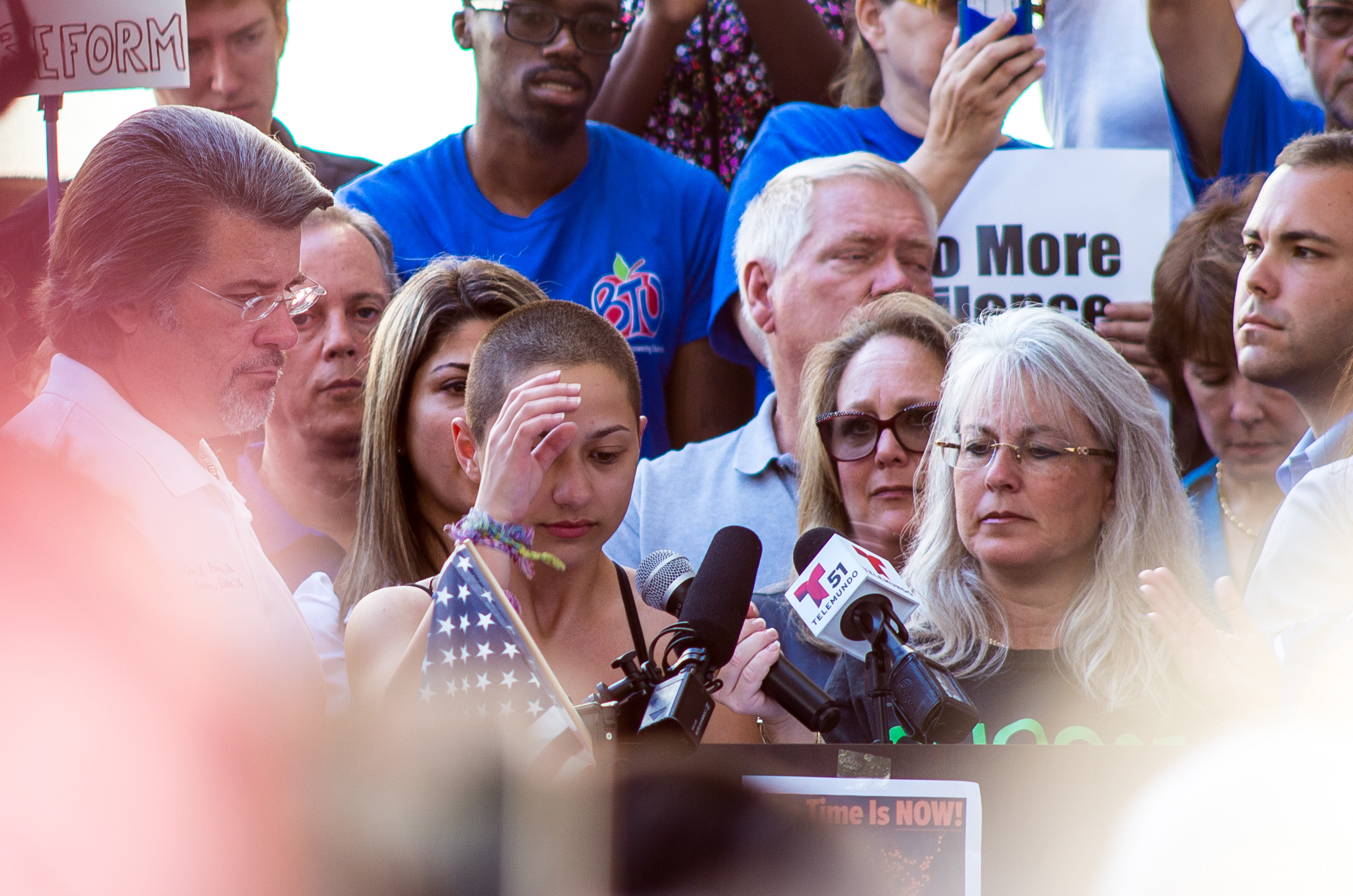
González speaks at the Rally to Support Firearm Safety Legislation in Fort Lauderdale, February 17, 2018.

"The people in the government who are voted into power are lying to us, and us kids seem to be the only ones who notice and are prepared to call B.S."

=== "We Call B.S." speech ===
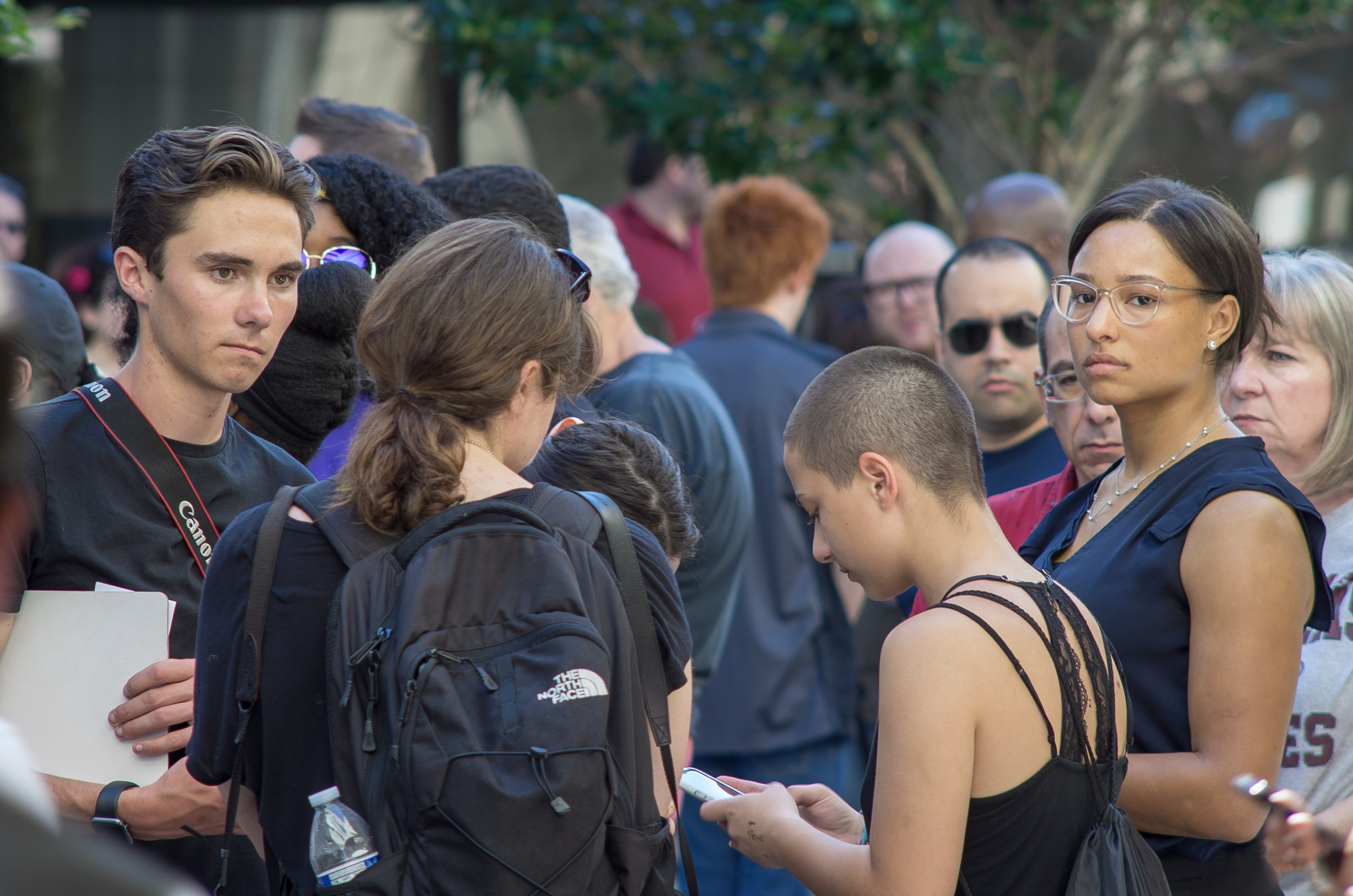
González and David Hogg attend the Rally to Support Firearm Safety Legislation in Fort Lauderdale on February 17, 2018.

On February 17, 2018, González gave an 11-minute speech in front of the Broward County Courthouse at a gun control rally in Fort Lauderdale, Florida. The speech was in reaction to the Stoneman Douglas High School shooting, three days previously, during which a gunman had killed 17 and severely injured many more.

In the speech they pledged to work with their peers to pressure lawmakers to change the law. "We are going to be the last mass shooting", González proclaimed. "That's going to be Marjory Stoneman Douglas in that textbook, and it's all going to be due to the tireless efforts of the school board, the faculty members, the family members and most importantly the students." The speech notably featured a call and response: "We call B.S.", in response to gun laws, calling for advocacy and empowering young people to speak out against school shootings. The speech then went viral. According to The Washington Post, González's speech became emblematic of the "new strain of furious advocacy" that sprang up immediately after the shooting.

In an interview with Ellen DeGeneres, González said they felt their message would resonate through repetition. "I knew I would get my job done properly at that rally if I got people chanting something. And I thought 'We call B.S.' has four syllables, that's good, I'll use that. I didn't want to say the actual curse words... this message doesn't need to be thought of in a negative way at all."

A recording of González delivering a line in the speech was sampled as the intro for Madonna's "I Rise", released in May 2019.

=== Subsequent activism and media appearances ===
They and other survivors spoke with Florida state legislators in Tallahassee on February 20, 2018. The students watched the legislature vote down debate on an existing gun control bill.

The students also spoke at an internationally televised town hall hosted by CNN on February 21, 2018. González and others criticized the National Rifle Association of America (NRA), as well as politicians who accept money from the NRA, as being complicit in the shootings and stated that "you're either funding the killers, or you're standing with the children."

At the town hall, González pressed an NRA representative to clarify their position on guns. "Dana Loesch, I want you to know that we will support your two children in the way that you will not", González said at the town hall. "The shooter at our school obtained weapons that he used on us legally. Do you believe that it should be harder to obtain the semi-automatic and... the modifications for these weapons to make them fully automatic like bump stocks?" Loesch answered González by arguing that mentally ill people should not have access to weapons. González interjected and noted that they had not answered their question. "I think I'm gonna interrupt you real quick and remind you that the question is actually, do you believe it should be harder to obtain these semi-automatic weapons and modifications to make them fully automatic, such as bump stocks?" Shortly after their viral speech and high-profile media appearances, González joined Twitter and acquired more than 1 million followers within a span of less than ten days.

González continued to speak out against gun violence. Glamour Magazine called González "the face of the #NeverAgain movement" and "a recognizable icon" while The Washington Post called them "La nueva cara of Florida Latinx" ("The new face of Florida Latinx") and drew comparisons to the revolutionary José Martí. NBC News called them "one of the most visible student activists to emerge from the shooting..." In a nationally televised interview on 60 Minutes, González described the idea of arming teachers in classrooms with guns as "stupid". In March 2018, González was on the cover of Time magazine along with fellow activists Jaclyn Corin, David Hogg, Cameron Kasky, and Alex Wind. That same month they were profiled by France 24.

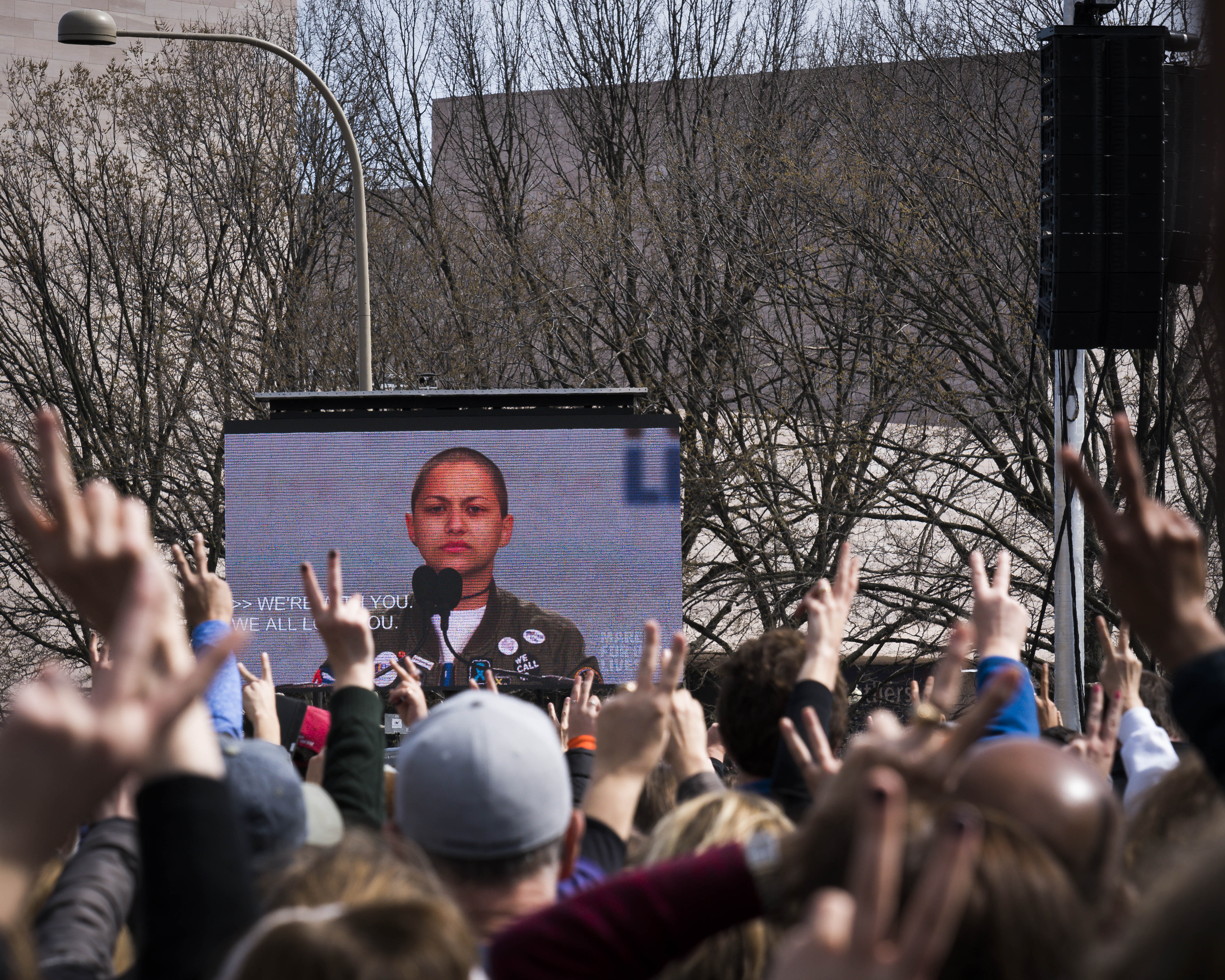
Protesters react as González remains silent as part of their speech at the March for Our Lives on March 24, 2018.

=== Speech at March for Our Lives ===
González and other students, including fellow Parkland survivors Hogg, Kasky, and Sarah Chadwick, organized and participated in the nationwide March for Our Lives protest on March 24, 2018, with a focus on speakers and a march in Washington, DC. González spoke for six minutes, the length of time of the Parkland shooting, and paid tribute to the victims by mentioning each one by name and giving examples of activities they would never again be able to do. They followed this by several minutes of silence. González was interviewed on MSNBC at the march, stating people needed to "empathize rather than feel apathy" and calling for young people to register to vote.

=== New laws ===
In March 2018, the Florida Legislature passed a bill titled the Marjory Stoneman Douglas High School Public Safety Act. It raises the minimum age for buying firearms to 21, establishes waiting periods and background checks, provides a program for the arming of some teachers and the hiring of school police, bans bump stocks, and bars potentially violent or mentally unhealthy people arrested under certain laws from possessing guns. In all, the law allocates around $400 million for implementation. Rick Scott signed the bill into law on March 9. The governor commented, "To the students of Marjory Stoneman Douglas High School, you made your voices heard. You didn't let up and you fought until there was change."

=== Continuing advocacy ===
In May 2018 González met with James Shaw Jr., a man who prevented further bloodshed at a mass shooting in a Waffle House restaurant by rushing the attacker and taking away his AR-15 rifle and saving more lives; both Shaw and González described each other as heroes.

== Attacks and conspiracy theories ==
González was attacked for their Fort Lauderdale speech by many from the Republican Party and the political right wing of American politics and press. They have also faced derogatory comments made by internet trolls about their sexual orientation, short hair, and skin color. They were verbally attacked by Leslie Gibson, then the Republican candidate running unopposed for the Maine legislature and lifetime NRA member, who referred to them as a "skinhead lesbian", whereupon 28-year-old Eryn Gilchrist filed papers to run against him, thus providing an opponent; Republican former state Senator Thomas Martin Jr., who said that Gibson's remarks did not represent the Maine Republican Party, and that he planned to contact the survivors to commend their courage, also filed to run for the seat. A few days later Gibson himself dropped out of the race.

González was the target of a number of far-right conspiracy theories and hoaxes since the shooting. Conspiracy theorists have falsely accused the students, including González, of being crisis actors. Benjamin Kelly, an aide to Florida state Representative Shawn Harrison (R-63), was fired after making such accusations. Donald Trump Jr. faced criticism for appearing to support the crisis actor accusations. The conspiracy theories spread about González and other Parkland survivors were named PolitiFact's 2018 Lie of the Year.

Following their highly publicized speech at the March for Our Lives, pro-gun activists doctored fake photos and video showing González ripping up a copy of the United States Constitution, spreading them widely on internet forums and social media. Snopes.com observed that the video was in fact a digitally manipulated Teen Vogue video of them tearing up shooting range targets. Adam Baldwin defended spreading the fake video, saying it was "political satire".

=== Attacks by Steve King and response ===
Republican congressman Steve King attacked González for wearing a Cuban flag patch on their jacket during their speech, saying in a post on Facebook, "This is how you look when you claim Cuban heritage yet don't speak Spanish and ignore the fact that your ancestors fled the island when the dictatorship turned Cuba into a prison camp, after removing all weapons from its citizens; hence their right to self defense." The Cuban flag worn by González was adopted in 1902, fifty years before the communist take over, and has been used by anti-Castro Cuban exiles as a symbol of patriotism. One of the survivors of the Orlando nightclub shooting, Brandon Wolf, responded to King saying "When it was my community, where were you? When it was Sandy Hook? Columbine? Were you on the sideline mocking those communities too? Did you question someone identifying as a mother? Did you question whether people like me were crisis actors?" and "Emma stood for 6 mins and 20 seconds to honor the lives of 17 gone too soon. The least you could do is shut your privileged, ineffective trap for 6 seconds to hear someone else's perspective." In an interview with the New Civil Rights Movement, Wolf also pointed out that King keeps a Confederate flag on his desk.

King's comments generated fierce condemnation from Wolf, González, and other members of Never Again MSD. In June 2018, as part of the March for Our Lives' "Road to Change" tour, gun control advocates and members of Never Again MSD arrived at King's office in Sioux City to protest against King. Protesters and gun control advocates berated King for his history of racially charged statements and attacks; González personally denounced King and accused him of racism. King largely ignored the protests.

== Personal life ==
González is non-binary, bisexual, and uses they/them pronouns. According to Vogue, their buzz cut is not a reaction to the school shooting, but rather to Florida's climate. "People asked me, 'Are you taking a feminist stand?' No, I wasn't. It's Florida. Hair is just an extra sweater I'm forced to wear," González recalled. "I even made a PowerPoint presentation to convince my parents to let me shave my head, and it worked." In May 2021, González announced the usage of a new personal name, X (inspired by Malcolm X) citing dissociation with their previous personal name and feminine pronouns.

== Works ==
- "Parkland Student Emma González Opens Up About Her Fight for Gun Control". Harper's Bazaar. February 26, 2018.
- "Opinion: A Young Activist's Advice: Vote, Shave Your Head and Cry Whenever You Need To". The New York Times. October 5, 2018.
- "Emma González on Why This Generation Needs Gun Control". Teen Vogue. March 23, 2018.
