= George Roumain =

American volleyball player (born 1976)

Personal information
- Born: March 28, 1976 (age 50)
- Hometown: Parkland, Florida, U.S.
- Height: 6 ft 6 in (198 cm)
- Education: Pepperdine University

Volleyball information
- Position: Outside hitter
- Number: 15 (national team)

National team
1999–2001	United States

George Roumain (born March 28, 1976) is an American former volleyball player. Roumain played volleyball for Marjory Stoneman Douglas High School in Parkland, Florida, and was considered the nation's top recruit. He played college volleyball for Pepperdine University, where he was a three-time All-American and was named National Player of the Year in 1998 and 1999.

Roumain was on the United States national volleyball team from 1999 to 2001. He competed at the 2000 Summer Olympics in Sydney.

In 2008, Roumain was inducted into the Pepperdine Hall of Fame.

== Beach volleyball ==
Roumain played beach volleyball in the AVP, and partnered with Sinjin Smith twice just before Smith retired. In 2004, with his partner Jason Ring, Roumain won the Huntington Beach Open title. He was selected as the AVP Rookie of the Year in 2004.

== Awards ==
- Three-time All-American
- Two-time NCAA National Player of the Year — 1998, 1999
- AVP Rookie of the Year — 2004
- Pepperdine Hall of Fame — 2008
