= Cameron Kasky =

American gun control activist (born 2000)

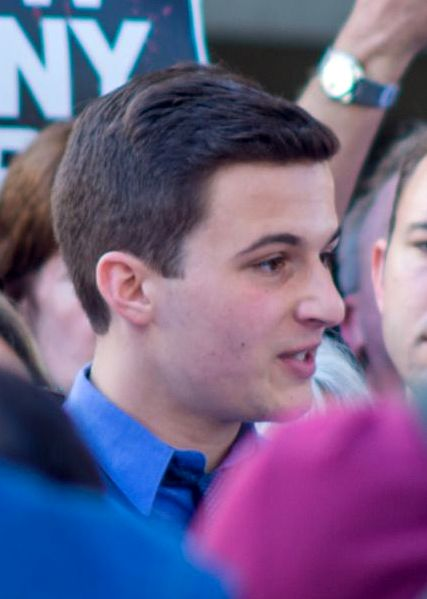
- Kasky speaking at a rally in 2018
- Born: Cameron Marley Kasky; November 11, 2000 (age 26); Hollywood, Florida, U.S.
- Education: Columbia University (attended)
- Years active: 2018–present
- Organization: Never Again MSD
- Known for: Gun control advocacy
- Political party: Democratic
- Other political affiliations: Democratic Socialists of America
- Website: Campaign website

Cameron Marley Kasky (born November 11, 2000) is an American activist and advocate against gun violence who co-founded the student-led gun violence prevention advocacy group Never Again MSD. He is notable for helping to organize the March for Our Lives nationwide student protest in March 2018. Kasky is a survivor of the February 2018 mass shooting at Marjory Stoneman Douglas High School. Kasky was included in Time magazine's "100 Most Influential People of 2018".

In November 2025, Kasky announced he was running for Congress in New York's 12th congressional district but in January 2026 withdrew his candidacy.

== Early life and education ==
Kasky was a student, a "theatre kid", and former member of the drama club at Marjory Stoneman Douglas High School, and was a junior at the time of the school shooting in February 2018. He has a younger brother with autism who is also a survivor of the MSD shooting. After graduating from high school, he attended Columbia University for several semesters, but dropped out.

== Advocacy ==
Kasky had just left drama class when the shooting began at Marjory Stoneman Douglas High School in Parkland, Florida, on February 14, 2018. After he met his younger brother at a different classroom and exiting the school, the fire alarm sounded. With other students, they were instructed to go back inside. They waited an hour in a classroom until they were rescued.

After the shooting, Kasky brought several school friends to his house and with them founded Never Again MSD (#NeverAgain), a student-led gun control advocacy group. Kasky came up with the name "Never Again" while the group stayed up through the night to make plans, and he posted "Stay alert. #NeverAgain" to Facebook. The group works to create a national movement against gun violence, including an effort to publicize legislators receiving money from the NRA and persuading people not to vote for them. It promoted and led a massive rally called March for Our Lives in Washington, DC, on March 24, 2018.

According to a report in The New Yorker, it was Kasky's idea to found the activist group along with fellow students David Hogg, X González, Sarah Chadwick and others – a group described by reporter Michael Schulman as having "moral clarity and vision" in the gun control debate. Kasky wrote an op-ed on the CNN website describing the events of the massacre and his reaction to it. In an interview, Kasky told the CNN anchor Anderson Cooper that "my generation won't stand for this." Although known as a "theatre kid" with a reputation for being the class clown, Kasky's experience after the shooting was primarily one of anger:

Can't sleep. Thinking about so many things. So angry that I'm not scared or nervous anymore ... I'm just angry. I just want people to understand what happened and understand that doing nothing will lead to nothing. Who'd have thought that concept was so difficult to grasp?

At a televised "Stand Up" town hall session sponsored by CNN with Senator Marco Rubio, Kasky asked the senator whether he would continue receiving money from the National Rifle Association (NRA): "Can you tell me right now that you will not accept a single donation from the NRA?" Rubio responded by saying, "I will always accept the help of anyone who agrees with my agenda." Kasky repeatedly questioned Rubio about whether he would continue receiving NRA money. The senator did not offer a definitive response but appeared to soften his positions regarding some gun restrictions.

Kasky temporarily stopped utilizing Facebook as a result of death threats. When later Kasky was accused of being a crisis actor, he replied to CNN's Wolf Blitzer that "if you had seen me in our school's production of 'Fiddler on the Roof,' you would know that nobody would pay me to act for anything."

Kasky announced the March for Our Lives rally on February 18, 2018. Later that week, Kasky appeared on The Ellen DeGeneres Show with X González and Jaclyn Corin to discuss their advocacy and march. Kasky said, "The thing that inspired us to create the march was people saying, 'This is not the time to talk about gun control, this is the time to mourn.' We understand that, so here's the time to talk about gun control. March 24th."

In March 2018, he appeared on the cover of Time magazine along with fellow activists Jaclyn Corin, X Gonzalez, David Hogg, and Alex Wind.

Kasky called President Donald Trump a "professional liar" on CNN after Trump delivered a pro-gun speech at the annual NRA convention in Dallas in May 2018, in contrast to Trump's prior call for gun control reform in the wake of the Parkland shooting. Kasky criticized the president to point out Trump said what he needed to say to appease the NRA.

In May 2018, Kasky's father registered a super PAC, Families vs Assault Rifles PAC (FAMSVARPAC), with intentions of going "up against NRA candidates in every meaningful race in the country".

=== New laws ===
In March 2018, the Florida Legislature passed a bill titled the Marjory Stoneman Douglas High School Public Safety Act. It raises the minimum age for buying firearms to 21, establishes waiting periods and background checks, provides a program for the arming of some teachers and the hiring of school police, bans bump stocks, and bars potentially violent or mentally unhealthy people arrested under certain laws from possessing guns. In all, it allocates roughly $400 million. The governor signed the bill into law on March 9. He commented, "To the students of Marjory Stoneman Douglas High School, you made your voices heard. You didn't let up and you fought until there was change."

=== Departure from March for Our Lives ===
On September 19, 2018, Kasky announced his decision to leave March for Our Lives in an interview with Fox News Radio. He expressed regret for some of his past actions, including confronting Rubio at the "Stand Up" town hall session and saying the name of the Parkland shooter aloud in his question to Rubio. However, Kasky said his decision to leave March for Our Lives was not due to a change of heart or political views. Instead, he wanted to take responsibility for his actions and encourage others to seek mental health services when necessary. Moving past March for Our Lives, Kasky worked on improving himself personally and a new podcast, "Cameron Knows Nothing". However, in an interview with Insider in 2022, Kasky revealed the reason he left March For Our Lives was because of his ongoing struggle with his mental health, which further took a toll on him during the time he was part of the organization.

=== Reactions ===
In The New Yorker, journalist Evan Osnos singled out Kasky's direct questioning of Marco Rubio at the CNN town hall as significant and as something no journalist had ever been able to do. People magazine stated that as founder of the #NeverAgain movement, and despite death threats from NRA supporters, "Kasky has committed himself to advancing legislative changes that will make it more difficult for people to get guns, and in the process, has helped inspire advocacy around the cause".

== Politics ==
Kasky endorsed Andrew Yang in the 2020 Democratic Party presidential primaries, claiming to be "very tired of... the same nonsense that's been failing the American people for generations. Yang is offering up solutions that change the game." Upon Yang dropping out, Kasky threw his support behind Bernie Sanders, and subsequently endorsed Joe Biden in the general election.

In 2025, Kasky was a vocal supporter of Zohran Mamdani's mayoral campaign.

=== 2026 congressional campaign ===
In September 2025, Kasky said he was considering running in the 2026 Democratic primary for New York's 12th congressional district to replace the retiring Jerry Nadler. He officially launched his campaign in November 2025. On January 14, 2026 Kasky announced he was ending his campaign to pursue a partnership with Representative Ro Khanna to advance human rights legislation concerning the Gaza genocide.

== Personal life ==
Kasky is queer. In his coming out as queer, reported by Out on September 14, 2021, Kasky said that his "ability to proudly share who I am today only exists due to queer activists, specifically queer activists of color, giving their lives for our right to exist...To those of you who are also struggling to find an identity that you find authentic, take your time. Look inwards and indulge in your beauty and light."

Kasky is Jewish.

== Selected works ==
- Kasky, Cameron (February 2018). "Parkland student: My generation won't stand for this". CNN.
- He appeared in The Room Returns!.
