= Jaclyn Corin =

American activist and gun control advocate

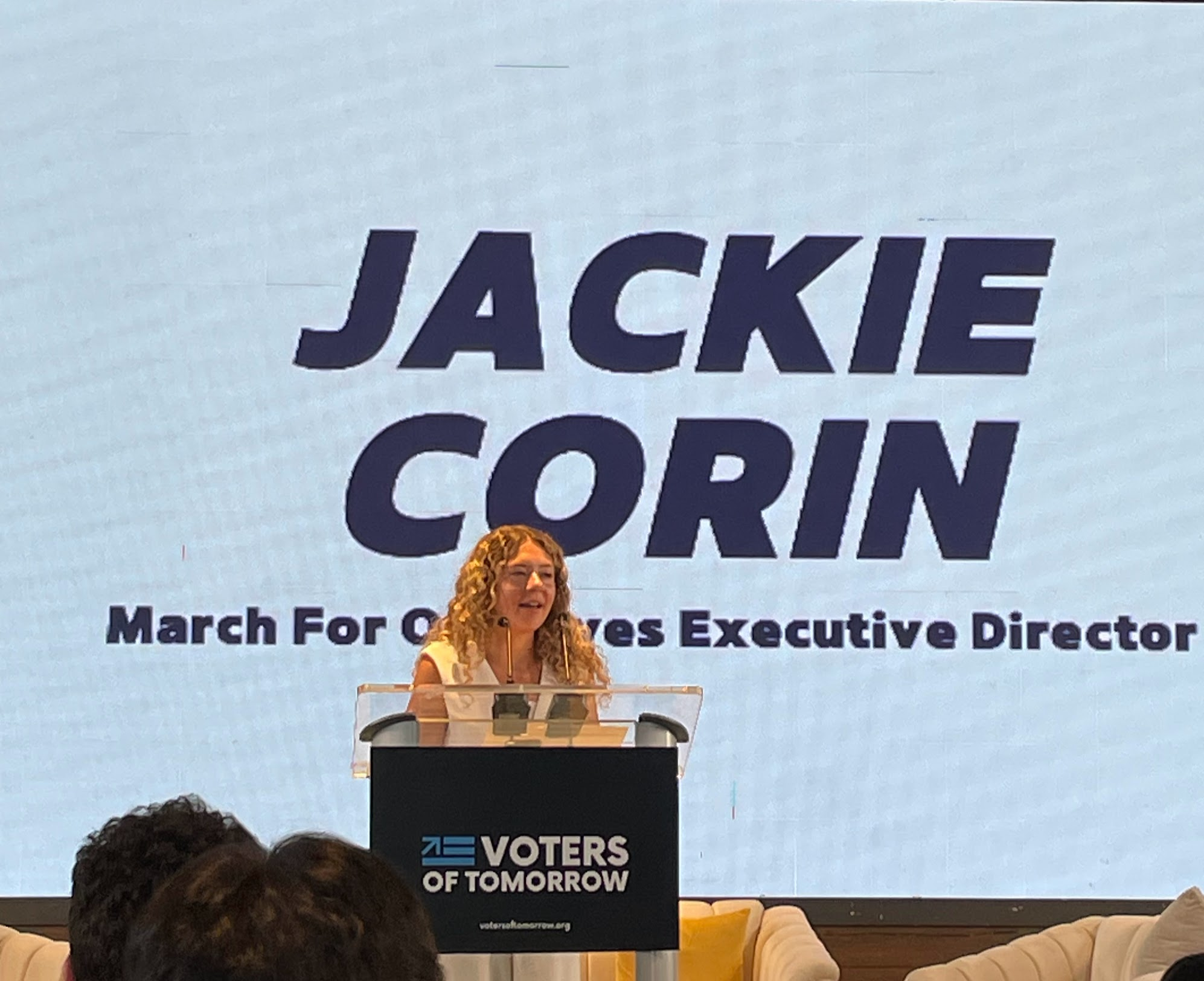
- Corin addresses an audience at the Voters of Tomorrow Summit 2025
- Born: October 27, 2000 (age 25); Orlando, Florida, U.S.
- Education: Marjory Stoneman Douglas High School; Harvard University
- Occupations: Student; activist
- Years active: 2018–present
- Known for: Advocacy for gun control
- Website: Official Twitter account

Jaclyn Corin (born October 27, 2000) is an American activist against gun violence and the current Executive Director of March for Our Lives as of March 2025. A survivor of the Stoneman Douglas High School shooting in 2018, she became one of the movement’s earliest organizers. The day after the shooting, Corin began planning a lobbying trip to Florida’s capital; less than a week later, she brought more than 100 classmates by bus to Tallahassee, Florida to meet with legislators.

She went on to co-found March for Our Lives, which began as a nationwide demonstration on March 24, 2018, and grew into a sustained youth-led movement. The organization now operates as two nonprofit entities: the March For Our Lives Foundation, a 501(c)(3) focused on education and community programs, and the March For Our Lives Action Fund, a 501(c)(4) that advances gun safety legislation and advocacy. In this work, Corin has been a vocal critic of politicians funded by the National Rifle Association.

Corin was included in Time magazine's 100 Most Influential People of 2018.

== Education and shooting ==
As a student attending Marjory Stoneman Douglas High School, Jaclyn Corin was the junior class president at the time of the deadly shooting in 2018. Her friend Jaime Guttenberg was killed in the shooting; she had once tutored the 19-year-old alleged gunman and former student of the school, Nikolas Cruz. During the shooting, Corin was locked in a room with other classmates for several hours, emerging with hands up as instructed by the police SWAT units.

After graduating from Stoneman Douglas in 2019, Corin attended Harvard University, where she studied Government. She graduated in 2023 and subsequently pursued graduate studies at the University of Oxford, earning a Master of Public Policy degree.

== Advocacy ==
=== Early activism ===
Corin met with fellow students at Stoneman Douglas, including David Hogg, X González, Cameron Kasky, and Alex Wind at Kasky's house; they formed the Never Again MSD movement during these meetings. At first it was a small core group of students, but subsequent meetings came to about twenty students. She explained that their media strategy was to knock through the gun-safety defeatism, reframe the debate, and keep making noise with powerful demonstrations. They acted quickly to take advantage of the news coverage.

Corin was a key organizer of the bus trip protest to the Florida state capital on February 20, six days after the shooting. A report in Vanity Fair suggested it was her idea to have the bus trip soon after the shooting because it was alive in the news cycle; she said "the news forgets – very quickly – we needed a critical mass event." Working with fellow students-turned-activists Cameron Kasky and David Hogg, she recruited one hundred MSD students to make an eight-hour bus trip to Tallahassee as part of a "lightning strike". She helped engineer the behind-the-scenes logistics including transportation, chaperone and sleeping arrangements, scheduling meetings with Florida lawmakers and getting permission slips from parents. She demanded the group wear normal school attire and not quibble about bus seating; when some asked for changes to sit with friends, she said "No – get on your bus." The trip was organized largely by social media and texting.

Corin was a key planner of the March for Our Lives nationwide student protest that occurred on March 24, 2018. She advocates that adults register to vote and vote, and that children pre-register. She discussed media coverage:

It's fading a little, but not to the point people are forgetting ... They know our message ... It's all leading up to the march ... Media trucks aren't lining our streets anymore, but people keep asking us for interviews. But we keep declining them. We don't want to over-saturate the media. We don't want people to get 'Oh, I'm sick and tired of these kids. So annoying.' And we also have school.

— Jaclyn Corin, March 7, 2018

Corin has made YouTube videos; one called "What If" got 1.4 million views in three days. In anticipation of the March for Our Lives, she appeared on the March 21, 2018 episode of the Rachel Maddow Show, along with Gonzalez and Sarah Chadwick. She spoke at a rally in Chapel Hill, North Carolina on March 29. She, Gonzalez, Hogg, Kasky and Alex Wind are pictured on the third week of March's Time cover.

Corin criticized the NRA and gun manufacturers for touting the Ideal Conceal, a handgun that folds up to resemble a smart phone. She faulted the NRA for "enforcing the normality of shooting other people"; further, she argued that police, confronting people including persons of color with smart phones, might believe that their phones were weapons, and shoot them accidentally.

=== Continuing involvement in March for Our Lives ===
After the initial organizing phase, Corin remained central to the enduring structure of March for Our Lives. The group launched the Road to Change tour, visiting over 100 communities across 24-30 states and registering tens of thousands of new voters while amplifying gun safety advocacy via rallies and town halls. One notable stop in Chicago included youth activists and public figures like Chance the Rapper and Gabby Giffords, emphasizing mental health, trauma support, and voter engagement.

Corin also helped build out March for Our Lives’ chapter program, which connected thousands of young people across the country in local organizing efforts modeled after the Parkland students’ activism. By 2019, hundreds of chapters had formed nationwide, serving as a core part of the organization’s grassroots infrastructure.

After graduating from Marjory Stoneman Douglas High School, Corin enrolled at Harvard University in 2019, where she studied Government. During this period she stepped back from day-to-day organizing to focus on her education, but remained involved as a strategist and spokesperson.

In 2022, following the Uvalde school shooting in Texas, March for Our Lives organized a second national march in Washington, D.C., which drew an estimated 50,000 demonstrators alongside dozens of sister marches across the country. Corin served as one of the organization’s public spokespeople, promoting the march through national media appearances. In June 2022, she was interviewed on The Tonight Show Starring Jimmy Fallon to amplify the group’s demands for federal gun safety legislation.

After completing her undergraduate degree at Harvard in 2023 and later pursuing graduate studies at the University of Oxford, Corin returned to March for Our Lives in a formal leadership role. In March 2025 she was named Executive Director of March for Our Lives, overseeing both the March For Our Lives Foundation, a 501(c)(3) focused on education and community programs, and the March For Our Lives Action Fund, a 501(c)(4) advocacy arm. In this capacity, she has led a major organizational restructuring and strategic planning effort.

In 2025, Corin and March for Our Lives launched a campaign against U.S. Attorney General Pam Bondi, criticizing what they described as her hypocrisy on gun violence and her role in rolling back federal gun safety progress.

== Works ==
- Corin, Jaclyn (March 2018). "I Helped Organize the "March For Our Lives" Because There Is Strength In Numbers". Seventeen.
- Corin, Jaclyn (February 2019). Would Congress Care More if Parkland Had Been a Plane Crash? The New York Times.
