= Sarah Chadwick (activist) =

American activist (born 2001)

- Born: August 1, 2001 (age 25); Margate, Florida, U.S.
- Education: Marjory Stoneman Douglas High School (graduated 2019); Syracuse University (2019–present)
- Occupations: Student; activist
- Years active: 2018–present
- Known for: Gun control advocacy

Sarah Chadwick (born August 1, 2001) is an American activist against gun violence and one of the leaders of the Never Again MSD activist movement.

== Marjory Stoneman Douglas High School shooting ==
On the day of the shooting, she described how she saw dozens of police cars arriving at the scene, while some of her friends were texting her from classrooms near the gunshots. In a televised interview, she stated that "never again should a child be afraid to go to school."

== Activism ==
A report in The Washington Post described her and fellow student Jaclyn Corin as "fierce" and particularly skilled at social media, effectively generating "8.7 times to volume of online conversations than the celebrities," according to a marketing analysis of the tweets of the Parkland students. She had a Twitter following of 150,000 people as of February 24, 2018. She has used satire and sarcasm to advance her agenda against gun violence. She is opposed to the National Rifle Association of America as well as politicians who get funding from the NRA. According to a report in The New York Times, Chadwick has been particularly effective in tweets to mock pro-gun politicians such as Marco Rubio:

We should change the names of AR-15s to "Marco Rubio" since they are so easy to buy.

— Sarah Chadwick, February 23, 2018

When President Trump offered condolences, she shot back with a tweet that went viral with 4,300 comments before it was removed:

I don't want your condolences you fucking price of shit, my friends and teachers were shot. Multiple of my fellow classmates are dead. Do something instead of sending prayers. Prayers won't fix this. But Gun control will prevent it from happening again.

— Sarah Chadwick on Twitter, February 15, 2018

When NRA spokesperson Dana Loesch posted a video saying that "your time is up", Chadwick posted a video response, using the hourglass meme:

We've had enough of the lies, the sanctimony, the ignorance, the hatred, the pettiness, the NRA. We are done with your agenda to undermine the safety of our nation's youth, and the individual voices of the American people.

— Chadwick, March 7, 2018

== Personal life ==
Chadwick identifies as a lesbian, telling Teen Vogue sister magazine Them, "I'm gay, so I'm a lesbian." The Huffington Post described Chadwick and fellow Never Again MSD co-founder X González as "part of the LGBTQ family". She is also pro-choice. She is studying political science and citizenship at Syracuse University.

== See also ==
- 2018 United States gun violence protests
- Never Again MSD
