= Marjory Stoneman Douglas High School =

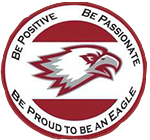

Location
- 5901 Pine Island Road; Parkland, Florida 33076; United States; 26°18′16″N 80°16′04″W

Information
- Other names: MSDH; MSD; MSDHS; Stoneman Douglas High School
- Type: Public high school
- Motto: Be Positive, Be Passionate, Be Proud to be an Eagle
- Established: 1990
- School district: Broward County Public Schools
- Superintendent: Peter B. Licata
- NCES School ID: 120018002721
- Principal: Michelle Kefford
- Teaching staff: 133.12 (on an FTE basis)
- Grades: 9–12
- Enrollment: 3,280 (2023–24)
- Student to teacher ratio: 24.64
- Colors: Burgundy and silver
- Nickname: Eagles
- Rival: Coral Springs High School
- Newspaper: The Eagle Eye
- Website: stonemandouglas.browardschools.com
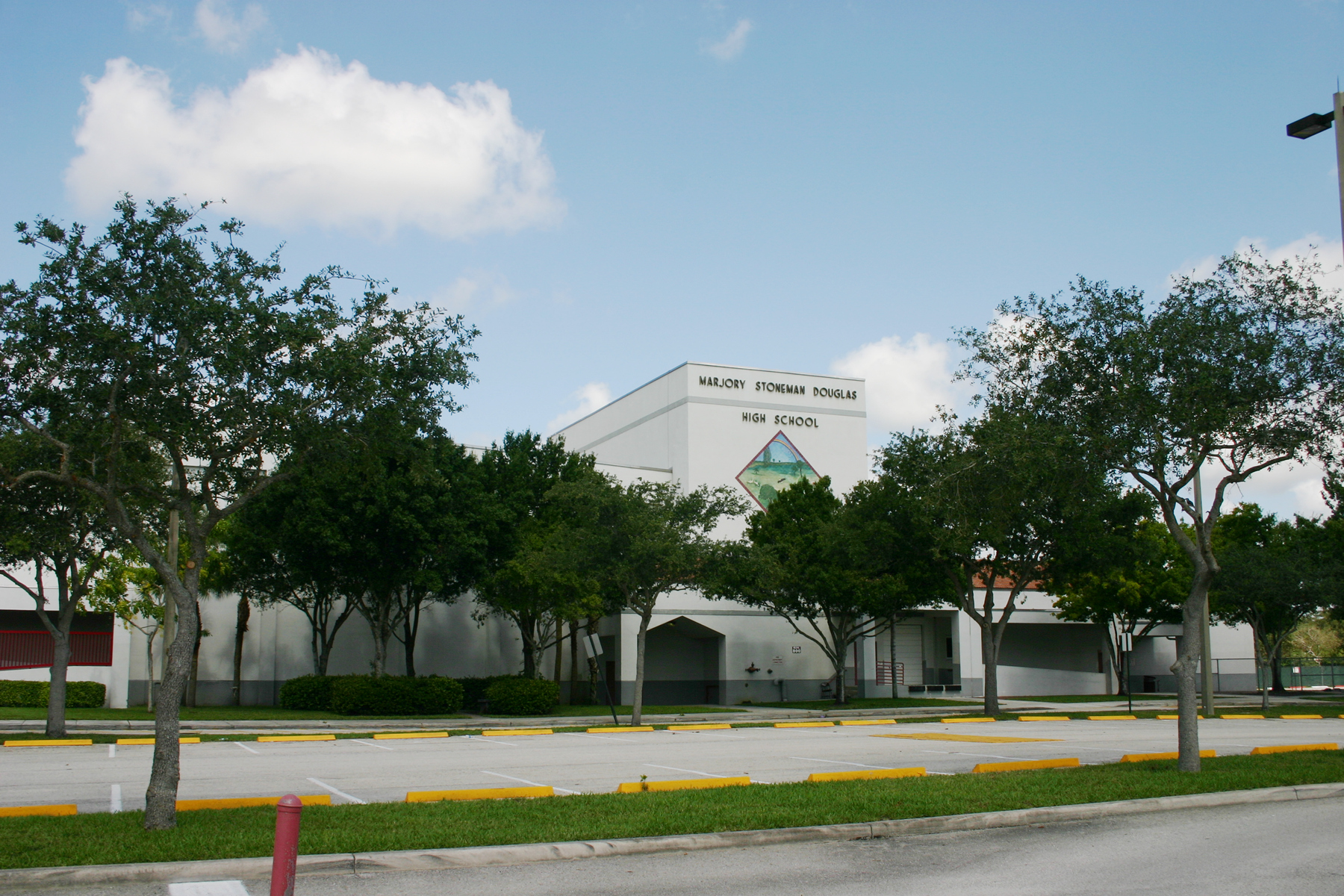
- Image of the school in June 2008

Marjory Stoneman Douglas High School (MSDHS) is a public high school in Parkland, Florida, United States. Established in 1990 as part of the Broward County Public Schools district and named after the writer Marjory Stoneman Douglas, it was the only public high school in Parkland, serving almost the entire city as well as a small section of neighboring Coral Springs.

On February 14, 2018, the school was the scene of a deadly mass shooting perpetrated by Nikolas Cruz, a 19-year-old former student of the school, in which fourteen students and three staff members were murdered, and seventeen others were injured. On June 14, 2024, the building where the shooting took place was demolished.

== History ==
Marjory Stoneman Douglas High School was named after the Everglades environmentalist Marjory Stoneman Douglas. The school is located just under two miles (3.2 km) from Everglades National Park, on part of the historical Everglades for which Marjory Stoneman Douglas advocated. The school opened in 1990, the year of her centennial, with students in grades 9 through 11, most of whom transferred from nearby schools Coral Springs High School and J. P. Taravella High School. The first senior class graduated in 1992.

=== Mass shooting ===
On February 14, 2018, a mass shooting at the campus perpetrated by a 19-year-old former student of the school armed with a semi-automatic AR-15 style rifle left 17 dead and 17 more wounded in less than six minutes. Cruz was apprehended an hour later. At the time, it was the deadliest high school shooting in U.S. history, surpassing the Columbine High School massacre on April 20, 1999, in which 14 people were killed.

In 2016, a MSDHS school resource officer and Broward County Sheriff's Office deputy had an investigator for the Florida Department of Children and Families (FDCF) speak to Cruz, but Cruz's therapist said that he was "not currently a threat to himself or others" and did not need to be committed. A mental health counselor said that Cruz did not meet the criteria under Florida law that allows the police to commit a mentally ill person against their will. MSDHS conducted a "threat assessment" on Cruz after the counselor's report, and the FDCF ultimately concluded that Cruz was not a threat because he was living with his mother, attending school, and seeing a counselor.

Authorities charged Cruz with first-degree murder, and the case went to trial in September 2021, along with the case of charges against Cruz for an alleged attack of a jail officer. On October 20, 2021, Cruz pleaded guilty to all charges, including murder and attempted murder. On November 2, 2022, Cruz was sentenced to 34 consecutive life sentences without the possibility of parole, one life sentence for each of the victims whom Cruz murdered and wounded.

Students from MSDHS were instrumental in helping organize nationwide student protests following the shooting, and in spurring the revision of Florida law on March 4, 2018, to raise the legal rifle-owner age from 18 to 21, with a three-day wait.

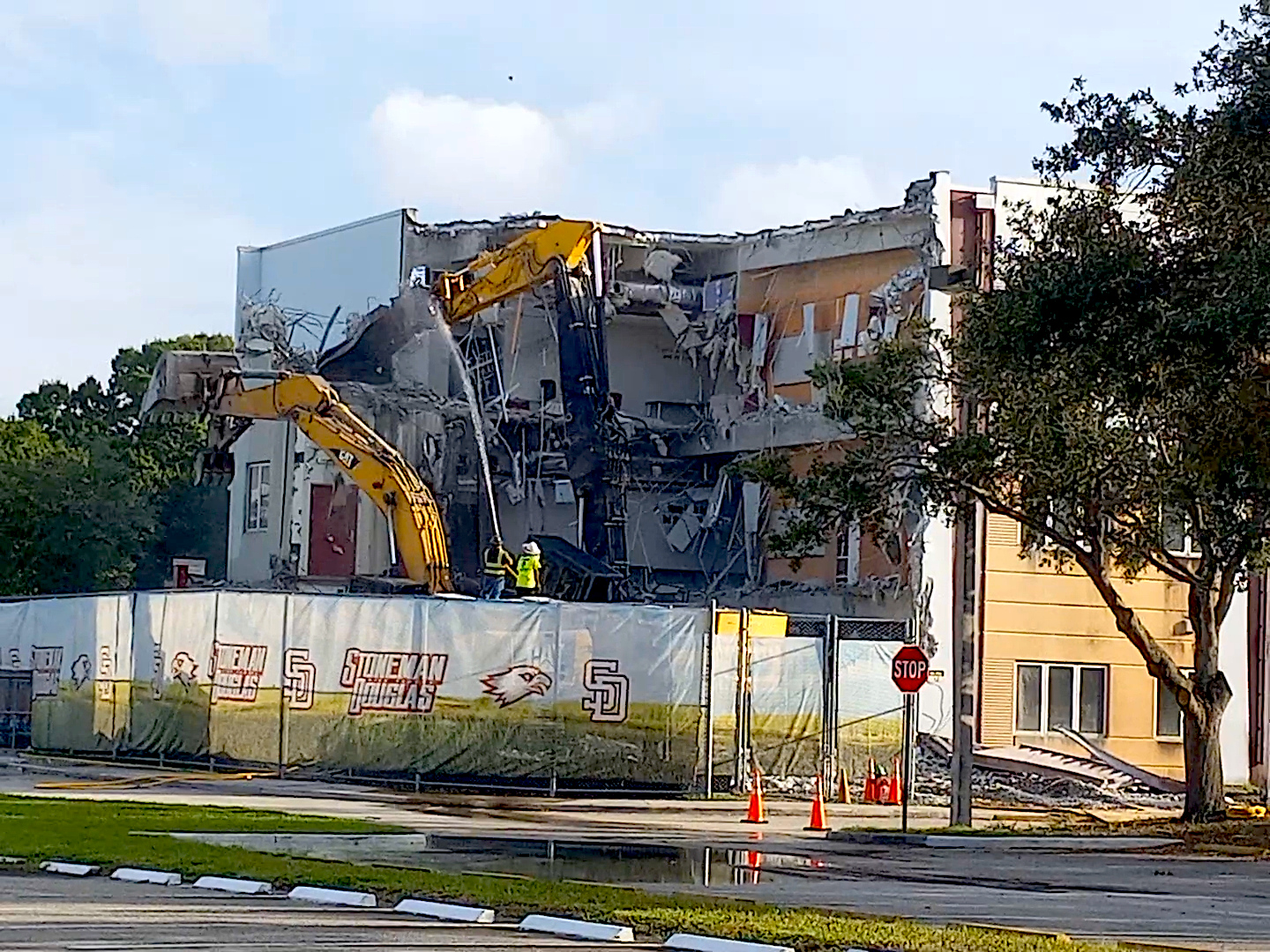
First day of the demolition

The building where the shooting occurred was permanently closed, and it served as evidence at the subsequent murder trial. Demolition of the structure began on June 14, 2024. The project was completed on July 5. Future plans for the site have not been finalized.

== Athletics ==
The Marjory Stoneman Douglas Athletics Department operates programs in football, volleyball, lacrosse, softball, tennis, track, water polo, bowling, basketball, cheerleading, soccer, wrestling, swimming, cross country, and golf.

The cheerleading squad at the school received international attention in 2012 when its coach was fired in response to complaints from parents. Parents complained about being charged thousands of dollars for their children to participate in the program, and alleged that the coach mishandled the team's finances and encouraged bullying.

== Academics ==
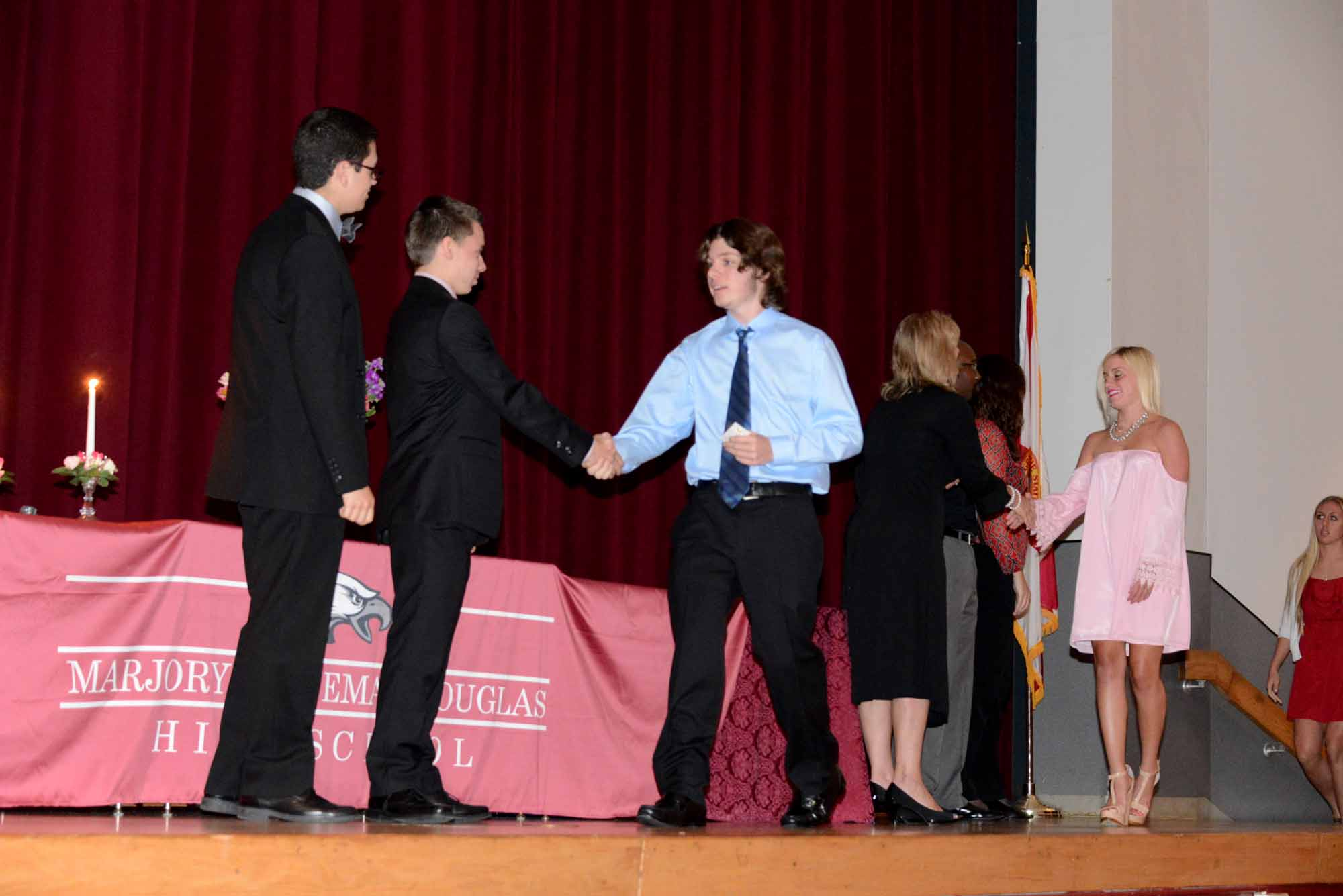
2014 National Honor Society induction at Marjory Stoneman Douglas High School

Newsweek's 2009 national ranking of high schools rated Marjory Stoneman Douglas High School as No. 208 in the U.S., and No. 38 in Florida, which was the highest ranking of any school in Broward County.

Marjory Stoneman Douglas High School had a Florida Comprehensive Assessment Test (FCAT) school grade of "A" for the 2011–12 academic school year.

=== Drama Club ===
Several students in the Marjory Stoneman Douglas Drama Club wrote "Shine," a song memorializing the victims of the school shooting in 2018 and others who have experienced gun violence. It has been performed at various venues, including a nationally-broadcast CNN town hall, and at the March for Our Lives rally in Washington, DC, on March 24, 2018. It has also been performed by other musical groups, such as the Badiene Magaziner Vocal Studio at the March for Our Lives rally in New York City on the same day. The drama club performed at the 2018 Tony Awards.

=== Newspaper ===
The Eagle Eye was the student-run news publication of Marjory Stoneman Douglas High School. They made international press for their reporting of the 2018 shooting and its aftermath. Two issues of the student newspaper were submitted for the Pulitzer Prize for their work covering student obituaries.

== Demographics ==
As of the 2017–18 school year, the total student enrolment was 3,330. The ethnic makeup of the school was 57% White, 22% Hispanic, 11% Black, 7% Asian and 3% multiracial. The school is 40% Jewish. 27% of the students were eligible for free or reduced cost lunch.

== Notable alumni ==
- Nick Bilton (1990), journalist and author
- Dave Aizer (1992), television host, writer and producer
- Jackie Sandler (1992), actress
- Mark Zupan (1993), wheelchair rugby player
- Lee Asher (1994), magician
- George Roumain (1994), Olympic volleyball and professional beach volleyball player
- Ian Grushka (1995), musician and songwriter (New Found Glory)
- Mike Caruso (1996), MLB shortstop
- Steve Klein (1997), musician (New Found Glory)
- Jordan Pundik (1997), musician and songwriter (New Found Glory)
- Jared Moskowitz (1998), U.S. Congressman
- Karamo Brown (1999), television host, reality television personality, author, and activist
- Vail Bloom (2000), actress
- Kevin Eakin (2000), NFL quarterback
- Matt Fox (2000), MLB pitcher
- Nicholas Thompson (2000), professional golfer
- Anthony Rizzo (2007), MLB All-Star first baseman
- Andrew Dymburt (2007), television reporter and anchor (ABC News)
- Cassie Scerbo (2008), actress
- Shayne Gostisbehere (2011 - transferred), NHL player
- Hunter Pollack (2015), activist
- Jesús Luzardo (2016), pitcher for the Philadelphia Phillies
- Colton Welker (2016), MLB third baseman
- Ryan Deitsch (2018), anti gun violence activist, March for Our Lives co-founder
- X González (2018), anti gun violence activist, March for Our Lives co-founder
- David Hogg (2018), former vice chair of the Democratic National Committee, anti gun violence activist, March for Our Lives co-founder
- Alfonso Calderon (2019), anti gun violence activist, March for Our Lives co-founder
- Jaclyn Corin (2019), anti gun violence activist, March for Our Lives co-founder
- Aalayah Eastmond (2019), activist
- Kyle Kashuv (2019), conservative activist
- Cameron Kasky (2019), anti gun violence activist, March for Our Lives co-founder, candidate for the Democratic nomination in the 2026 election in New York's 12th Congressional District
- Alex Wind (2019), anti gun violence activist, March for Our Lives co-founder
- Coby Mayo (2020), third baseman for the Baltimore Orioles
- Sam Deitsch (2021), author and gun control activist
- Lauren Hogg (2021), anti gun violence activist, March for Our Lives co-founder
- Roman Anthony (2022), outfielder for the Boston Red Sox
- Vladislava Dediceva ("Vimp"), Fishtank Season 5 Freeloader
- Nikolas Cruz, perpetrator of the Parkland High School shooting in 2018
- Gio Rojas (2026), left-handed pitcher in the Texas Rangers organization
