= Alex Wind =

American activist

- Born: Alexander Blake Wind; January 30, 2001 (age 25)
- Education: Marjory Stoneman Douglas High School; Pennsylvania State University
- Occupation: Student activist
- Years active: 2018–present
- Organization: Never Again MSD
- Known for: Advocacy against gun violence

Alexander Blake Wind (born January 30, 2001) is an American student activist against gun violence. A survivor of the Stoneman Douglas High School shooting and a founding member of the Never Again MSD movement, he is a critic of politicians who are supported by the National Rifle Association of America. Wind was one of five Stoneman Douglas students featured on the cover of Time magazine in 2018.

Wind was included in Time magazine's 100 Most Influential People of 2018.

In a speech televised internationally at the March for Our Lives protest in Washington on March 24, 2018, Wind criticized people who think that "teenagers can't do anything", and he cited examples of young people from history including Joan of Arc and Mozart. He criticized the idea of arming teachers as a defense against violence, saying that if "teachers start packing heat, are they going to arm our pastors, ministers, and rabbis?" He insisted that young people must vote in the upcoming election. Wind urged people to contact their congresspersons and ask them to declare their stance on gun control and not accept campaign contributions from the NRA, and to petition lawmakers to take steps to end gun violence.

Wind was a member of the drama club of Stoneman Douglas High School, and he was one of the first students to speak out online after the shooting. He promoted the March for Our Lives student protest in numerous media interviews. He sang the national anthem before a basketball game featuring the Miami Heat. At the March for Our Lives nationwide protest in Washington, he said:

To all the politicians out there, if you take money from the NRA, you have chosen death. If you have not expressed to your constituencies a public stance on this issue, you have chosen death. If you do not stand with us by saying we need to pass common-sense gun legislation, you have chosen death. And none of the millions of people marching in this country today will stop until they see those against us out of office. Because we choose life.

— Alex Wind, addressing the March for Our Lives, March 24, 2018
