= Arming teachers =

Practice of training and equipping teachers with firearms

Teacher discussing why she carries gun to school

Arming teachers is equipping teachers in preschool through secondary school with firearms with the intent to prevent casualties from school shootings. Such proposals have engendered public debate regarding with whom the responsibility for providing a safe environment lies, and whether it would reduce or escalate the risk of shootings. School shootings, and proposals to arm teachers, are most common in the United States, but proposals have also been made in countries such as Israel, Kenya, Pakistan, South Africa, and Thailand.

In the United States, proposals to arm teachers were made following shootings at schools in Columbine, Colorado; Omaha, Nebraska; Newtown, Connecticut; Sidney, Ohio; Parkland, Florida; and Uvalde, Texas. 43 percent of Americans support arming of school personnel, with greater support among gun owners, Republicans, and White Americans. The federal Gun-Free School Zones Act of 1990 allows individual states to designate who may carry guns in schools.

== Public debate ==
Training teachers to carry guns

In places where proposals to arm teachers were made or implemented, public debate ensued. Opponents of arming teachers argue that it is not the teachers' job to provide security, but rather the task of the government, as the teachers' employer, to provide a safe work environment. Another argument is that doing so would be a public health hazard, escalating violence and posing a risk to both students and staff at schools. Opponents state that teachers could accidentally shoot themselves or accidentally shoot students or staff, that teachers could accidentally discharge their firearm, that there are legal risks associated with improper use of firearms that could create a heightened liability risk for insurance companies, that a teacher responding to a perpetrator with force could be mistaken as the perpetrator by law enforcement, that black students would feel less safe around armed teachers due to institutional racism and that teachers could misplace, lose, not properly store, or have their firearms stolen.

The RAND Evaluation of the New York City Police Department Firearm Training and Firearm-Discharge Review Process found only 18 percent of shots fired by trained police officers in gunfights hit their criminal targets. This suggests four or five of every six shots fired by comparably trained teachers would hit something or someone other than the targeted shooter. Sherrilyn Ifill, president of the NAACP Legal Defense Fund, wrote, "although the perpetrators of mass school shootings have been almost exclusively white, there's little doubt that arming teachers will lead disproportionately to the killing—by teachers—of children of color."

Proponents of arming teachers state it would minimize deaths and deter potential attackers from carrying out attacks at schools. Proponents also state that teachers in the United States have both a right and responsibility to use firearms to protect themselves and their students. They point out that where security has been entrusted to police or private guards, they have failed to prevent attacks.

== Policy by country ==
=== Israel ===
Israel had experienced six school shootings dating back to the 1970s. In response, in 1995 a law mandating an armed security guard at every school with more than 100 students was passed, while teachers remained unarmed. In 2001, a proposal was made to establish "stand-by" squads of teachers to respond to terrorist attacks. The teachers would be volunteers, who already have gun licenses, and would be trained by police in emergency response.

The plan was not implemented. Instead, some schools post an armed guard outside the entrance.

=== Kenya ===
The Kenya Union of Post Primary Education Teachers (KUPPET) has called on the Kenyan government to deploy firearms to teachers and offer security training to tutors following incidents of teachers in high-risk areas being killed by attackers.

=== Pakistan ===
In some provinces of Pakistan, teachers were permitted to carry weapons after the 2014 Peshawar school massacre. In 2015, an armed teacher shot and killed a twelve-year-old student in an accidental discharge of his weapon.

=== South Africa ===
Following a spate of violent incidents in schools, including fatal stabbings, sexual assault and rape, which culminated in the June 2019 murder of a teacher at the Masuku Primary School in Folweni, south of Durban, arming teachers became a topic of public debate in the country. One of South Africa's teachers' unions called on the government to allow teachers to bring guns to school for self defence, pointing out that the murder happened at a school where a government security guard was present, but did not prevent the crime.

In 2022, a Durban teacher was suspended by the KwaZulu-Natal education department after allegedly bringing a gun to school to intimidate pupils she accused of being noisy and rebellious.

=== Thailand ===
Beginning in January 2004, terror campaigns by Islamic militants in the southern provinces of Thailand targeted government installations. By mid-2005, they had taken the lives of more than 700 people, including at least 24 teachers. In response, the Thai government announced that they would arm and train teachers in their use.

=== United States ===
Legality of staff possession of firearms in schools in the United States by state in 2019 State explicitly allows school employees to carry firearms State allows concealed carry. State allows school districts to grant permission to carry firearms. State outlaws carrying firearms in schools.

In the United States, where school shootings are most common, advocates have proposed arming teachers as a possible intervention. It is a controversial part of the gun control debate. A 2021 poll found that 43% of Americans supported policies that allow teachers and school personnel to carry guns in schools, while a majority of teachers, parents and students are opposed. In a 2019 national survey of 2,926 teachers, more than 95% did not believe teachers should carry a gun in the classroom, and concerns raised by teachers include how to keep the gun secured in the classroom, with one asking, "If a kid reaches for my gun, am I to shoot them?". A 2022 Trafalgar Group poll found that 57.5% of American believe that policies that prevent trained teachers and school staff from carrying guns make schools a more dangerous place.

The Gun-Free School Zones Act of 1990 applies general restrictions on bringing guns to schools but provides the option for states to designate specific people to carry guns in schools. Research regarding arming and training teachers is limited. While some researchers have not found evidence that arming teachers increases safety in schools, there have been numerous documented incidents of school staff using their firearm to neutralize a shooter.

Schools which have offered firearm training for teachers include schools in the Clifton Independent School District in Texas, Sidney High School in Ohio, and various schools in Florida.

In 2022, some states have been making it easier for teachers to carry firearms for self defense purposes on school campuses. For example, Ohio signed a bill into law that reduced the amount of training hours from 700 to 24 hours, citing that 700 hours was "excessive" and that this and similar legislation is "probably the most important thing we have done to prevent a school shooter in Ohio." In 2022, 28 states allow people other than security staff to carry firearms on school grounds, with laws in nine of those states explicitly mentioning school employees.

Writing for Reason magazine in August 2022, columnist Jacob Sullum responded to a New York Times piece that was criticizing the perceived low number of hours required for teachers to be armed in some states. Sullum commented that "The real scandal here is not how little training is mandated for teachers who want to carry handguns in school but how little training police officers receive for a job that extends far beyond handling firearms." The New York Times opinion staff noted that 2022 was the United States' worst year yet for mass shootings, and described that teachers had been having more discussions about arming themselves.

==== State-by-state ====
===== Texas =====
In Texas, there are proposed ideas and ideas in place that are for the arming of teachers, such as the law passed for School Marshals. Texas state senator Ted Cruz proposed arming teachers as well. Within Texas, there is discourse from citizens regarding whether or not educators should be armed, but it is ultimately legal.

==== History ====
The idea of arming teachers was considered after the 1999 Columbine High School massacre. In 2011, a proposal to arm teachers was made in response to an Omaha, Nebraska, school shooting in which a student killed the vice principal and then committed suicide. A measure was proposed by Nebraska state senator Mark R. Christensen to allow concealed handguns in schools for security guards, administrators and teachers, but it did not pass the legislature.

The idea gained popularity after the 2012 Sandy Hook Elementary School shooting in Newtown, Connecticut. Following the shooting, some schools began allowing teachers to carry firearms. Notably, the Sidney City School District in Sidney, Ohio, voted to arm teachers and began implementing an armed-response program.

In 2013, Texas passed the Law for School Marshals, a solution towards the growing gun violence issues. Not all schools have decided to implement a School Marshal, but those that have require being employed by the school, a valid License to Carry, must pass a psych exam, and complete an 80 hour training course.

The concept of arming teachers entered the public eye following the 2018 Stoneman Douglas High School shooting, in which 17 people were fatally shot; meeting with students and parents at a gun reform event, President Donald Trump suggested the idea of arming educators. Republican politicians in the United States soon expressed their support for arming teachers afterwards, including Betty Olson, Francis Rooney, Michael Speciale, and Betsy DeVos.

The topic of arming teachers resurfaced following the 2022 Robb Elementary School shooting, with Republican lawmakers pushing the idea.

==== Public opinion polling ====
While 43 percent of Americans favor allowing school personnel to carry guns, support for arming teachers is higher among those who own guns, Republicans, and White Americans but lower among Democrats, African Americans, and Hispanic and Latino Americans.

One survey of teachers found that most respondents opposed taking up arms, and also found that some teachers feel excluded from the conversation while political outsiders and commentators discuss it. Two surveys conducted in 2018 indicated many public school teachers do not want to carry guns, and would prefer to have other teachers similarly unarmed. The Gallup poll reported 73 percent of teachers opposed being armed, while the largest teachers union, the National Education Association, reported 82 percent would not carry a gun in school and 64 percent would feel less safe if other faculty were armed. Most parents and students oppose arming teachers.

In 2018, Lauren Willner, assistant professor conducted a study on 2,926 Teachers across the states and found 95% did not want to be required to carry firearms, and 6% said they were comfortable enough to stop a school threat. Despite these statistics, 16% of those in the study were gun owners and 25% said they were slightly familiar with firearms.

A 2022 Trafalgar Group poll found that 57.5% of Americans believe that policies that prevent trained teachers and school staff from carrying guns make schools a more dangerous place. This belief was more widespread among Republicans (67.5%) than Democrats (48.2%), and among Blacks (73.2%) than Whites (58.6%) or Asians (18.4%).

A 2023 Texas Tribune article regarding public opinion on the states Marshal Program shows mixed feelings between educators. Just 84 school districts out of 1,207 had adopted the School Marshal program. At the time only 361 educators out of over 369,000 in the state of Texas. While some teachers are against the program due to safety concerns such as having firearms around children, others are disappointed that the state did not allocate funding or offer monetary assistance to the teachers to purchase a firearm.
