= March for Our Lives =

US gun violence prevention organization

March For Our Lives
- Formation: February 21, 2018; 8 years ago
- Type: Nonprofit
- Headquarters: Washington, D.C.
- Methods: Demonstrations; Voter registration Legislative advocacy
- Fields: Gun violence prevention
- Executive director: Jaclyn Corin
- Website: marchforourlives.org

March For Our Lives is an American advocacy organization that campaigns for stricter gun laws. It was founded in 2018 by students who survived the shooting at Marjory Stoneman Douglas High School in Parkland, Florida, in which 17 students and staff were killed. The organization comprises two nonprofit corporations: the March For Our Lives Foundation, a 501(c)(3), and the March For Our Lives Action Fund, a 501(c)(4).

The group organized the March For Our Lives demonstration in Washington, D.C., on March 24, 2018, and followed it with a national bus tour, Road to Change, to register young voters before that year's midterm elections. In 2019 it released a gun policy platform called "A Peace Plan for a Safer America". It held nationwide marches again in 2022 and made the first political endorsement in its history in July 2024, backing Kamala Harris for president.

Revenue fell sharply after the organization's first year, and in March 2025 it laid off 13 of its 16 full-time staff and named co-founder Jaclyn Corin as executive director. A former employee sued the organization and Corin that year alleging retaliation; the organization denied the allegations, and the case was dismissed in November 2025 after a settlement.

== History ==
=== Founding ===
Students at Marjory Stoneman Douglas High School began organizing in the days after the February 14, 2018, shooting. Cameron Kasky created the hashtag #NeverAgain and gathered classmates at his house to plan a response. Jaclyn Corin, the school's class president, organized a trip for 100 students to lobby the Florida legislature on raising the state's minimum age for firearm purchases from 18 to 21. Four days after the shooting, students including Corin, X González and David Hogg announced plans for a demonstration in Washington during an appearance on Face the Nation. Organizers said the founding board consisted of adults because of legal restrictions on minors serving on nonprofit boards, and Deena Katz, a television producer, was the Action Fund's president in 2018.

The March 24 demonstration in Washington drew hundreds of thousands of people, and similar protests took place in cities around the country and the world.

=== Road to Change ===
In June 2018 the group announced a two-month bus tour called Road to Change, which made more than 50 stops in over 20 states, with a separate Florida tour visiting all 27 of the state's congressional districts. The tour launched on June 15 at an annual peace march in Chicago organized by Saint Sabina Church. Organizers said they would not endorse candidates; Kasky told NBC News the group believed in "policies and principles, not people". By the tour's end the group had registered at least 10,000 young voters and met more than 50 youth groups, and by November 2018 it had more than 60 official chapters.

In October 2018 the founders published Glimmer of Hope: How Tragedy Sparked a Movement, a collection of personal essays about the group's origins and its first months. The authors said they would donate their profits to the March For Our Lives Foundation for distribution to grassroots gun violence prevention groups.

=== Generation Lockdown ===
In 2019 the organization released "Generation Lockdown", a public service announcement created by the advertising agency McCann New York, in which an eleven-year-old girl leads a group of adults through an active-shooter drill at a workplace in National City, California. The campaign was built around the fact that 95 percent of American public schools conduct lockdown drills. McCann won the Grand Prix for Good at the 2019 Cannes Lions International Festival of Creativity for the campaign, along with three Film Lions, a Gold Lion in social and influencer and a Silver Lion in public relations.

=== A Peace Plan for a Safer America ===
On August 21, 2019, weeks after mass shootings in El Paso, Texas, and Dayton, Ohio, the organization released a six-point gun policy platform titled "A Peace Plan for a Safer America". The group said the plan would halve gun deaths within a decade.

The platform called for a national gun licensing and registry system, a ban on assault weapons and high-capacity magazines, a national buyback program, extreme risk protection order laws, and a national director of gun violence prevention reporting to the president. It also proposed automatic voter registration at 18, urged the Federal Election Commission and the Internal Revenue Service to investigate the National Rifle Association, and called for repeal of the Protection of Lawful Commerce in Arms Act. Beto O'Rourke was the first 2020 presidential candidate to endorse the plan.

Lawrence Keane of the National Shooting Sports Foundation called the proposals "deeply troubling" and said a federal licensing program was unnecessary because, in his view, exercising a constitutional right does not require a government license. An NRA spokeswoman said the group's proposals were "out of the mainstream".

=== 2022 marches and federal legislation ===
After the Robb Elementary School shooting in Uvalde, Texas, and the shooting at a supermarket in Buffalo, New York, the organization held nationwide demonstrations on June 11, 2022, and said about 450 rallies were planned. CBS News reported that organizers hoped for as many as 50,000 people at the Washington Monument and had focused on smaller events at an estimated 300 locations. Speakers in Washington included co-founders David Hogg and X González.

The Trace reported that the organization could take some credit for the passage of the Bipartisan Safer Communities Act in 2022, the first significant federal gun legislation in decades, and for the creation of the White House Office of Gun Violence Prevention. The 19th reported that the Biden administration met at least three demands the group had issued at the start of the administration: establishing that office, allocating at least $1 billion for community violence intervention programs, and recognizing gun violence as a public health crisis. The office was established in September 2023 and was closed during Donald Trump's second term.

=== 2024 endorsement ===
On July 24, 2024, the organization endorsed Vice President Kamala Harris for president, the first political endorsement in its history, having declined to endorse candidates during its 2018 voter registration tour. The group cited Harris's record on gun violence prevention, including her leadership of the White House Office of Gun Violence Prevention. Natalie Fall, then executive director, said the endorsement did not mean the group would stop pressing Harris to do more.

=== Restructuring and litigation ===
On March 20, 2025, the organization laid off 13 of its 16 full-time employees and named Corin, a member of its board, as executive director. Corin attributed the decision to a difficult fundraising climate and said the organization had taken on more than its resources could sustain. Executive director Natalie Fall had left the previous month, and five employees had been let go in late 2024.

A former development director sued the Action Fund and Corin in New York, alleging that the terminated staff had been retaliated against for voicing opposition to racial discrimination by the board; the organization denied the allegation in a court filing, and Corin said financial pressure alone had driven the layoffs. The case was removed to federal court and was dismissed on November 26, 2025, after the parties reached a settlement in principle.

=== Campaigns since 2025 ===
In July 2025 the organization began a petition and advertising campaign directed at Attorney General Pam Bondi, which Corin said was intended to draw attention to what she described as a reversal of positions Bondi had taken on firearms as attorney general of Florida. That September it was among more than a dozen gun violence prevention groups that supported "30 Under 30", a magazine profiling young people killed by gun violence, produced by Change the Ref and Founders Agency and distributed at the Forbes 30 Under 30 Summit.

In May 2026 the organization released "Ripple Effect", the first in a four-part series of public service announcements. The same month, it worked with the model Racquel Chevremont and designer Clarence Ruth on a gown resembling a bulletproof vest, staged outside the Met Gala and carrying a message about gun violence. During the 2026 FIFA World Cup it distributed jerseys resembling the United States men's national soccer team kit outside Penn Station and Times Square in New York City, with the message "#1 cause of death for American kids: guns" printed on the back.

== Structure and finances ==
Both corporations were incorporated in Delaware on February 21, 2018. The March For Our Lives Foundation received recognition of exemption under section 501(c)(3) in August 2018 and files from Washington, D.C.; the March For Our Lives Action Fund received recognition under section 501(c)(4) in September 2018 and files from New York City.

The Action Fund reported $18.7 million in revenue for 2018, its first year, and $3.6 million against $3.9 million in expenses in 2024. The Trace reported in 2025 that the organization had never come close to matching its first-year total, that it had spent more than it collected every year since 2020, and that the Foundation supplied nearly half of the $24 million it collected between 2019 and 2023. Brian Mittendorf, a nonprofit accounting specialist at Ohio State University who reviewed the filings for The Trace, said the organization had spent down its early windfall and, while not at risk of collapse, would have to shrink without a new source of revenue.

== Awards and recognition ==
In April 2018 five of the co-founders were named to Time's annual list of the 100 most influential people, in an entry written by former president Barack Obama. That November Corin, González, Hogg and Matt Deitsch received the International Children's Peace Prize from the KidsRights Foundation, presented by Desmond Tutu in Cape Town. In 2019 the John F. Kennedy Library Foundation gave its New Frontier Award to March For Our Lives, recognizing Edna Chavez, Ryan Deitsch, Hogg and Tyah-Amoy Roberts.
