= Political Victory Fund =

Political action committee of the NRA

NATIONAL RIFLE ASSOCIATION OF AMERICA POLITICAL VICTORY FUND
- Formation: July 1976; 50 years ago
- Type: Political action committee
- Registration no.: C00053553
- Region served: United States
- Website: www.nrapvf.org

The Political Victory Fund (NRA-PVF) is the political action committee (PAC) of the National Rifle Association of America (NRA). Founded in 1976, the Fund endorses political candidates on behalf of the NRA and contributes money to those candidate's campaigns. It maintains a rating system which awards grades to political candidates based on their support or opposition of gun control measures.

== Background ==
The NRA-PVF was established in 1976 as an NRA subsidiary and registered as a political action committee (PAC).

The NRA-PVF operates a rating system for political candidates that assesses their support for gun-rights. It also helps its members locate an NRA Election Volunteer Coordinator (EVC) for their area and to register to vote.

== History ==
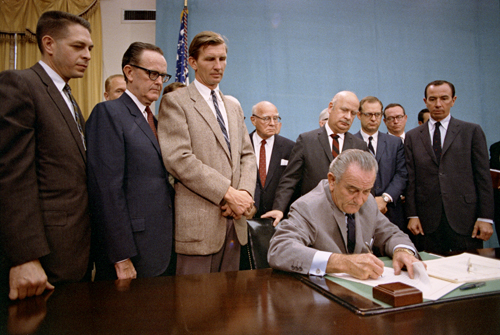
President Lyndon B. Johnson signs the Gun Control Act of 1968 into law.

Until the 1960s, the NRA had often downplayed gun control issues, even backing some minor legislation. With passage of the Gun Control Act of 1968, an increasing number of NRA members became more involved in gun politics and gun rights. Along with the creation of its lobbying arm, the Institute for Legislative Action (NRA-ILA), with activist Harlon Carter as director, in 1976 the NRA established its non-partisan political action committee (PAC), the Political Victory Fund, in time for the 1976 elections.

The NRA-PVF endorsed Ronald Reagan in the 1980 presidential campaign, the first NRA presidential endorsement.

By 1998, the NRA-PVF ranked as "one of the biggest spenders in congressional elections".

In the 2004 elections, 95% of the NRA-PVF endorsed federal candidates and 86% of the endorsed state candidates were elected.

By 2008, during the elections, the PVF spent millions "on direct campaign donations, independent campaign expenditures and on mobilizing the most aggressive grassroots operation in NRA history." In 2012, NRA-PVF income was $14.4 million and expenses were $16.1 million. By 2014, the NRA-PVF income rose to $21.9 million with expenses of $20.7 million.

== Rating political candidates ==
Through the Political Victory Fund, the NRA began to rate political candidates "irrespective of party affiliation—based on voting records, and public statements" on their positions on gun rights on a point scale of A+ to F. An NRA "A+" candidate, such as Todd Tiahrt, is one who has "not only an excellent voting record on all critical NRA issues, but who has also made a vigorous effort to promote and defend the Second Amendment", whereas an NRA "F" candidate is a "true enemy of gun owners' rights". Since 2010 the NRA-PVF has taken an increasingly hard line on ratings, with the result that by the 2020 US elections there was only one Democratic candidate left with a top "A" rating—down from 25% of Democratic candidates in 2010. By 2022, no Democrat received a top grade.

Mike Spies, who has been reporting on the gun lobby since 2015, wrote a series called "The Gunfighters", which investigated the influence of the National Rifle Association (NRA) on state gun policy and politics. In his March 17, 2016 article published in The Trace, Mike Spies described how the NRA began to use their scoring system to influence judicial nominations. The first attempt was during the confirmation proceedings of Supreme Court justice Sonia Sotomayor in 2009 at the request of Mitch McConnell and again in 2010 with Elena Kagan. In 2011, the NRA opposed Caitlin Halligan's nomination to the Court of Appeals for the D.C. Circuit and as a result, Senate Republicans blocked her confirmation. In 2016, the NRA opposed the nomination of Merrick Garland to the Supreme Court because he did not "respect the individual right to bear arms"—in 2007, Garland had "cast a vote in favor of allowing his court to review a crucial opinion by a three-judge panel that had found D.C.'s handgun ban unconstitutional." This article was cited in The Second Amendment and Gun Control: Freedom, Fear, and the American Constitution which presented both sides of the debate between those who "favour more gun controls and those who would prefer fewer of them."

== Chairman ==
Chris W. Cox served as the NRA's chief lobbyist and principal political strategist between 2002 and 2019. In this role he also served as the NRA-PVF chairman, and "has directed NRA's electoral efforts at every level." There were some internal disputes that led to Cox's departure. NRA-Watch Group transcribed the highlighted details in the deposition that Cox testified in about the revolving details about his departure and resignation as Chairman of the PAC. It was rumored by the New York Times that Cox was interested in plotting a coup of the CEO Wayne Lapierre because of his financial misconduct. However, during Cox's testimony he found it, "not only false, but offensive". His testimony was a part of the Public Relations Firm (Advertisers) Ackerman McQueen lawsuit against the NRA, in 2021. In May 2023, Randy Kozuch was named the interim Executive Director of the NRA Chief Lobbyist, who previously worked with the NRA-ILA for almost 30 years.
