= Chris W. Cox =

American lobbyist

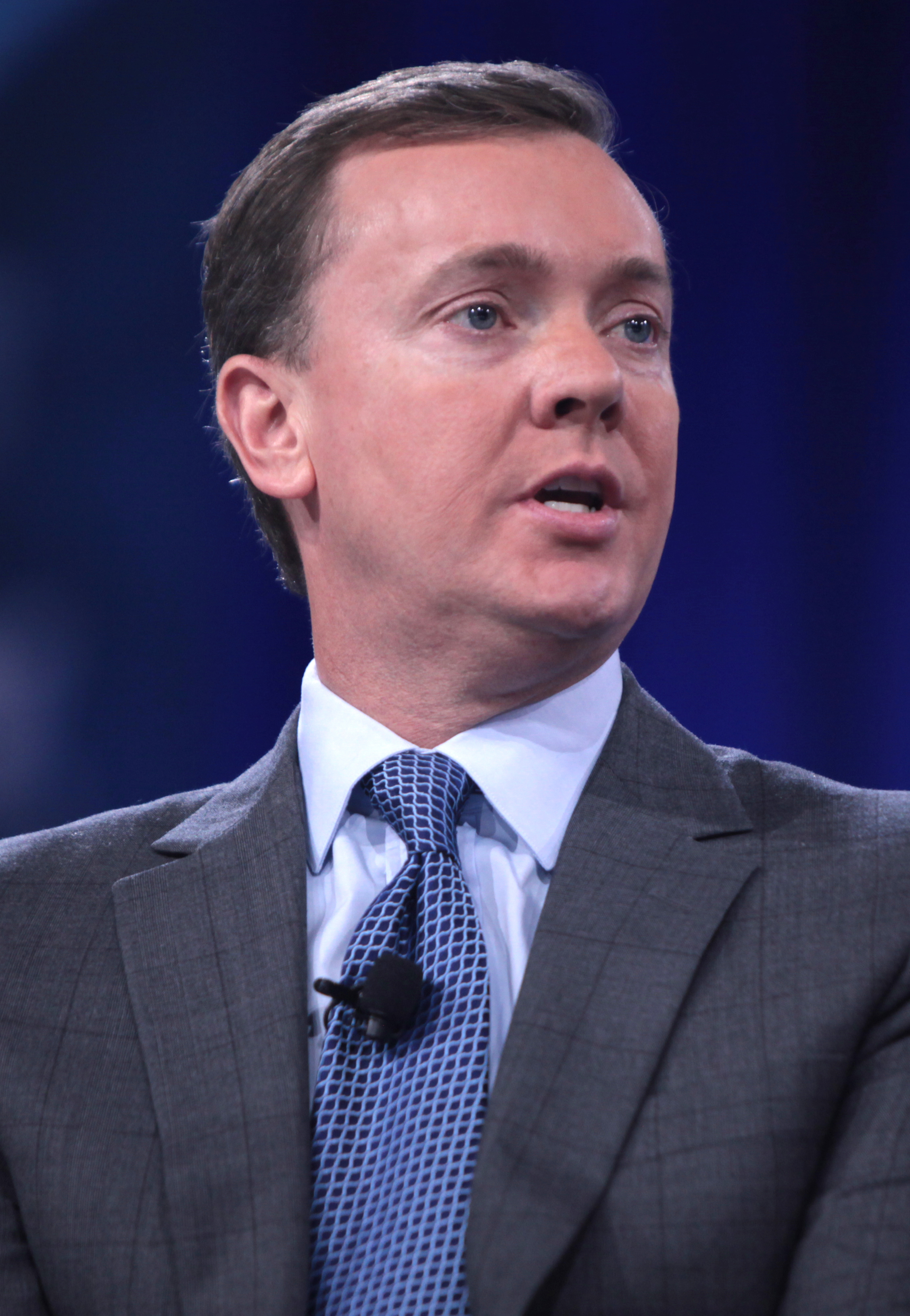
- Chris W. Cox in March 2016
- Education: Rhodes College
- Occupations: President, Capitol 6 Advisors

Christopher William Cox is an American lobbyist and public relations consultant. From April 2002 to June 2019 he served as executive director of the NRA Institute for Legislative Action (NRA-ILA), the lobbying arm of the National Rifle Association of America (NRA). As executive director Cox encompassed the roles of chief lobbyist and principal political strategist.

He oversaw eight divisions within the NRA-ILA, including Federal Affairs; State & Local Government Affairs; Public Affairs; Grassroots; Finance; Research; Conservation; Wildlife & Natural Resources; and Office of Legislative Counsel. Cox was also chairman of NRA's Political Victory Fund (NRA-PVF), the association's political action committee.

Strategic differences and management struggles within NRA leadership led to Christopher Cox leaving the organization in June 2019. On June 20, 2019, The New York Times reported that Chris Cox "had been placed on administrative leave", and he subsequently resigned on June 26, 2019.

== Early life and education ==
Cox attended The Baylor School for grades 10–12, and is a graduate of Rhodes College in Memphis, Tennessee, where he earned a Bachelor's degree in History. Before his career at the NRA, Cox served as a congressional aide on legislative issues relating to hunting sports and gun ownership for U.S. Rep. John S. Tanner [D-TN8, 1989–2010].

== NRA career ==
Cox joined NRA in 1995. Before becoming chief lobbyist and principal political strategist, Cox held other senior positions within the NRA-ILA. He was promoted to deputy director of the ILA Federal Affairs Division shortly before being named Executive Director of the NRA-ILA in 2002.

=== Assault Weapons Ban ===
In 2004, Cox lobbied on behalf of the NRA-ILA to end the 1994 Assault Weapons Ban. Due to a sunset provision, the ban was set to expire after 10 years. Cox utilized a grassroots campaign, which included editorial pieces and news media appearances. Senator Dianne Feinstein (D-CA) attached a rider to Congress's Protection of Lawful Commerce in Arms Act. Had the amendment passed, the AWB would have been extended an additional ten years. Though President George W. Bush had agreed to sign the ban into law if the amendment passed, Cox and the NRA-ILA lobbyists were successful, and the bill was voted down 8–90. The ban expired on September 13, 2004.

=== 2004 elections ===
According to his NRA-ILA biography, Cox was successful in lobbying for NRA-supported candidates in the 2004 elections. 95% of the NRA-PVF endorsed federal candidates and 86% of the endorsed state candidates were elected. Cox was at the forefront of a media campaign to re-elect incumbent President Bush, by utilizing the organization's grassroots technique.

=== Lawsuit protection ===
In 2003 the NRA supported a bill in Congress to protect manufacturers from certain types of lawsuits, the "Protection of Lawful Commerce in Arms Act" (S.659/S.1806). The bill was also supported by the U.S. Chamber of Commerce, the National Association of Manufacturers, and the National Association of Wholesaler-Distributors, but opposed by many gun-control groups. The Senate amended the bill to extend the assault weapons ban and close the so-called gun-show loophole, whereupon the NRA withdrew its support and the bill was defeated in March 2004.

A new "Protection of Lawful Commerce in Arms Act" (S.397) passed and was signed into law by President George W. Bush in October 2005. The bill carried two amendments: requiring the purchase of a trigger lock with any handgun purchase; and authorizing the Department of Justice to study the penetration characteristics of ammunition and make a determination if the ammunition fits the category of "armor piercing".

=== Sandy Hook Shooting ===
After the Dec. 14, 2012 massacre of school children in Newtown, Connecticut, one of the deadliest mass shootings in U.S. history, Cox was reported to have recommended the NRA take a lower-key approach amid a wave of national outrage. Instead, NRA chief executive Wayne LaPierre decided to go on the offensive and actively lobby for security guards in schools.

=== Resignation ===
Cox was placed on administrative leave June 20, 2019 and resigned from his NRA position June 26, 2019 after NRA officials accused of him participating in an extortion scheme to oust LaPierre from the organization. Cox denied the allegations.

== Post-NRA career ==
On July 11, 2019, days after resigning from his NRA position, Cox launched a new consulting firm in Washington, DC with the aim of assisting clients with legislative, political and public image issues.

== See also ==
- Gun politics in the United States
