= Todd J. Rathner =

American activist

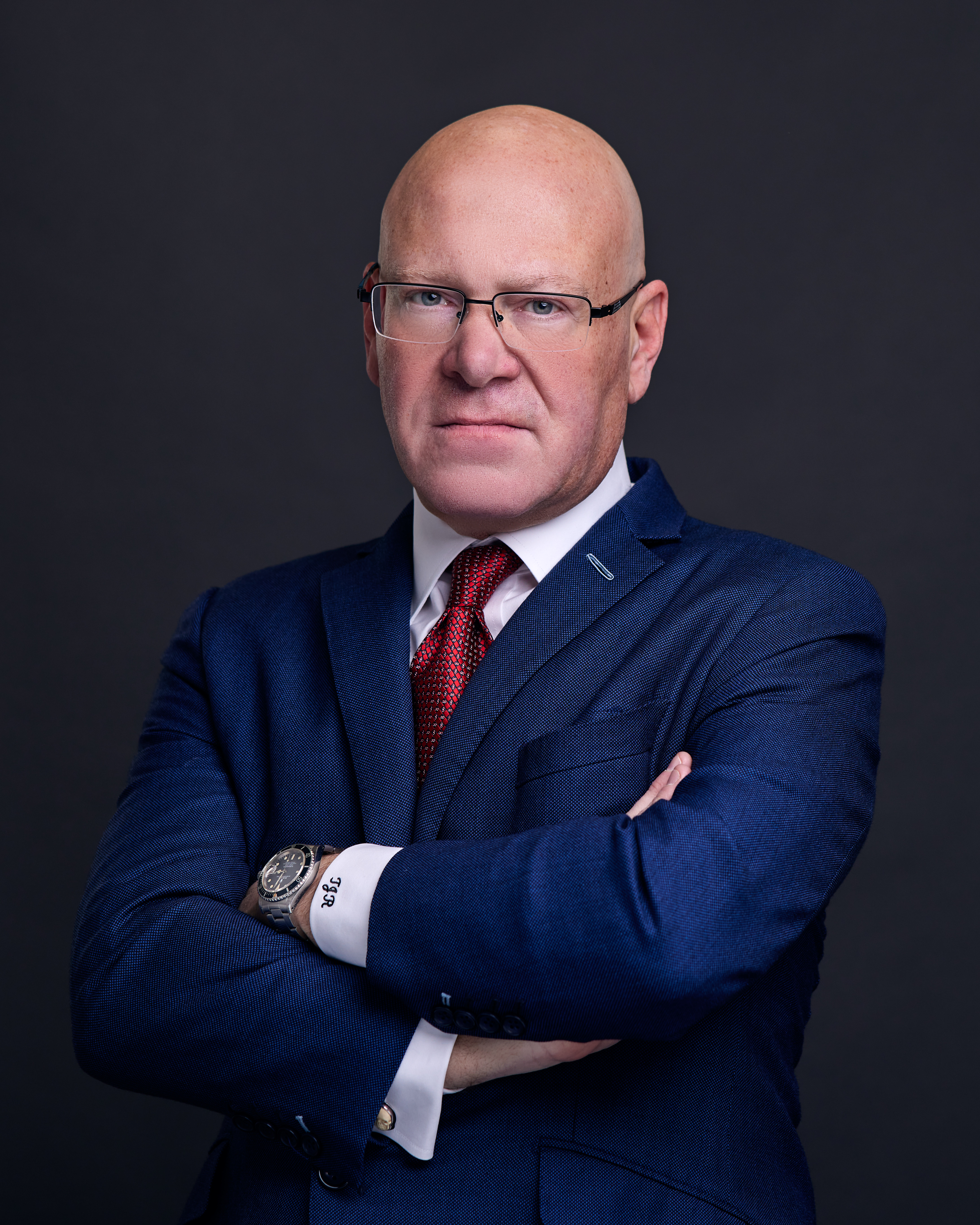
- Born: November 6, 1965 (age 60); Queens, New York, US
- Occupation: Lobbyist
- Employer(s): Rathner and Associates
- Website: http://www.rathnerandassociates.com/

Todd J. Rathner (born November 6, 1965) is an American Second Amendment lobbyist and former member of the National Rifle Association of America (NRA) Board of Directors, where he was elected in 1999 and served until 2022.

Rathner lives in Tucson, Arizona. He grew up in New York and is the owner of the T. Jeffrey Safari Company.

Rathner has been a Second Amendment lobbyist for over 15 years and served on the NRA Board of Directors and the following NRA committees: Executive Committee, Legislative Policy Committee and the International Affairs Committee. Rathner is the Director of Legislative Affairs for Knife Rights.

As an Arizona lobbyist, in 2010 Rathner played a critical role in enacting Arizona's "Constitutional Carry" law, which allows law-abiding citizens to carry a concealed weapon without a permit.

On October 6, 2014, Rathner announced the formation of the NFA Freedom Alliance (NFAFA), an organization dedicated to protecting NFA gun owners, dealers, and manufacturers interests by influencing public policy primarily through lobbying. One of the primary stated goals of the NFAFA is to enact "Shall Certify" legislation in all 50 states to mitigate the effects on NFA gun owners of the Bureau of Alcohol, Tobacco, Firearms and Explosives 41P Proposal. NFA gun owners are defined as those who own silencers, short barreled rifles, short barreled shotguns and machine guns. Rathner talked at length in regard to the NFAFA, the organization's aims, and accomplishments on the Arizona-based Gun Freedom Radio show that aired on 06/25/16

Rathner gained additional notoriety following the April 12, 2015, death of Freddie Gray, an African American man who died in the custody of the Baltimore Police Department after being arrested for purportedly carrying an illegal knife. Rathner's efforts to overturn knife laws such as the one under which Gray was arrested quickly gained national attention. In June 2016 Rathner successfully lobbied the New York State Senate to pass S6483-A/A9042-A, revising the state's much-publicized and highly controversial law banning the possession of gravity knives.

In 2017, Rathner was instrumental in the passage of Texas House Bill 1935 into law that allows the open carry of blades longer than 5 1/2" in public. The bill was signed into law by Texas Governor Greg Abbott and became effective on September 1, 2017.

In February 2022, Rathner resigned from the NRA Board of Directors.

== Awards and recognition ==
- Named Conservationist of The Year by Arizona Game and Fish Commission 2002.
