= List of congressional candidates who received campaign money from the National Rifle Association =

The National Rifle Association (NRA) has been standing as an interest group that supports key interests surrounding the protection of the Second Amendment in the United States. The issue of gun control has become increasingly important in American politics. Therefore, interest groups on either side of the issue have worked to back political candidates who support their interests. This has resulted in significant spikes in lobbying activity and more specifically, campaign contributions to candidates. The 2016 and 2018 election cycles, saw the National Rifle Association contribute to an extensive amount of candidates as a result of the state of the country's political landscape at the time of those cycles.

This list of United States congressional candidates who received campaign money from the National Rifle Association of America is from the nonpartisan group OpenSecrets which extracts campaign contribution data from the Federal Election Commission. It includes current as well as former representatives and senators as well as candidates for office for the 2016 and 2018 election cycles. This list shows only the direct contributions to each campaign but does not include more substantive contributions for lobbying and outside spending. In 2016, direct contributions (in this list) totaled $1,085,100; lobbying efforts (not in this list) totaled $3,188,000; and outside spending (not in this list) totaled $54,398,558. The career totals column includes all money contributed from the NRA either directly or in an effort to elect or reelect the candidate. This includes direct support payments, money spent to elect the candidate and also money used to campaign against the opposing candidate. Money, whether it be in the form of a payment or for campaigning, effectively allows the organization to control what happens in Congress.

Congressional Candidates who received campaign money from the NRA-- click on arrows to sort the columns --
| Candidate | State | House (H) or Senate (S) | Party R=Republican D=Democratic | Amount | Election cycle | Career totals (as of 2023) | Notes |
|---|---|---|---|---|---|---|---|
| Roy Blunt | MO | S | R | $11,900 | 2016 | - | |
| Barbara Comstock | VA | H | R | $10,400 | 2016 | - | |
| Richard Burr | NC | S | R | $9,900 | 2016 | - | |
| Mike Coffman | CO | H | R | $9,900 | 2016 | - | |
| Chuck Grassley | IA | S | R | $9,900 | 2016 | - | |
| Frank Guinta | NH | H | R | $9,900 | 2016 | - | |
| Cresent Hardy | NV | H | R | $9,900 | 2016 | - | |
| Dean Heller | NV | S | R | $4,000 | 2018 | - | |
| Marco Rubio | FL | S | R | $9,900 | 2016 | 3,303,355 | |
| Will Hurd | TX | H | R | $9,900 | 2016 | - | |
| John Katko | NY | H | R | $9,900 | 2016 | | |
| John Katko | NY | H | R | $2,000 | 2018 | | |
| Stewart Mills | MN | H | R | $9,900 | 2016 | | |
| Rand Paul | KY | S | R | $9,900 | 2016 | 110,060 | |
| Bruce Poliquin | ME | H | R | $9,900 | 2016 | - | |
| Bruce Poliquin | ME | H | R | $2,000 | 2018 | - | |
| Rob Portman | OH | S | R | $9,900 | 2016 | - | |
| Lee Zeldin | NY | H | R | $9,900 | 2016 | - | |
| Joe Heck | NV | H | R | $8,900 | 2016 | - | |
| John Hoeven | ND | S | R | $8,450 | 2016 | - | |
| Johnny Isakson | GA | S | R | $8,450 | 2016 | - | |
| Karen Handel | GA | H | R | $3,000 | 2018 | - | |
| Rod Blum | IA | H | R | $7,450 | 2016 | - | |
| Rod Blum | IA | H | R | $1,000 | 2018 | - | |
| Bob Goodlatte | VA | H | R | $7,450 | 2016 | - | |
| Bob Goodlatte | VA | H | R | $4,950 | 2018 | - | |
| Ron Johnson | WI | S | R | $7,450 | 2016 | 2,624,228 | |
| Don Young | AK | H | R | $6,950 | 2016 | - | |
| Martha McSally | AZ | H | R | $6,500 | 2016 | - | |
| Martha McSally | AZ | H | R | $2,000 | 2018 | - | |
| Kelly Ayotte | NH | S | R | $5,950 | 2016 | - | |
| John Boozman | AR | S | R | $5,950 | 2016 | 87,599 | |
| John Culberson | TX | H | R | $5,950 | 2016 | - | |
| John Culberson | TX | H | R | $4,950 | 2018 | - | |
| John Faso | NY | H | R | $5,950 | 2016 | - | |
| John Faso | NY | H | R | $3,000 | 2018 | - | |
| Scott Garrett | NJ | H | R | $5,950 | 2016 | - | |
| Paul Ryan | WI | H | R | $5,950 | 2016 | - | |
| Paul Ryan | WI | H | R | $9,900 | 2018 | - | |
| Bill Shuster | PA | H | R | $5,950 | 2016 | - | |
| Rick Saccone | PA | H | R | $2,500 | 2018 | - | |
| Lloyd Smucker | PA | H | R | $5,950 | 2016 | 242,680 | |
| Claudia Tenney | NY | H | R | $5,950 | 2016 | 149,879 | |
| Todd Young | IN | H | R | $5,950 | 2016 | 2,903,882 | |
| Tom Cole | OK | H | R | $5,000 | 2016 | 43,812 | |
| Tom Cole | OK | H | R | $1,750 | 2018 | 43,812 | |
| James Lankford | OK | S | R | $5,000 | 2016 | 26,563 | |
| John Thune | SD | S | R | $5,000 | 2016 | 651,440 | |
| Don Bacon | NE | H | R | $4,950 | 2016 | 50,267 | |
| Don Bacon | NE | H | R | $1,000 | 2018 | 50,267 | |
| John Bergman | MI | H | R | $4,950 | 2016 | 22,752 | |
| John Bergman | MI | H | R | $1,500 | 2018 | 22,752 | |
| John Boehner | OH | H | R | $4,950 | 2016 | 22,752 | |
| Charles Boustany Jr. | LA | H | R | $4,950 | 2016 | - | |
| James Corner | KY | H | R | $4,950 | 2016 | 22,791 | |
| Mike Crapo | ID | S | R | $4,950 | 2016 | 60,392 | |
| Mike Gallagher | WI | H | R | $4,950 | 2016 | 44,563 | |
| Richard Hudson | NC | H | R | $4,950 | 2016 | 56,465 | |
| John Kennedy | LA | S | R | $4,950 | 2016 | 220,763 | |
| Markwayne Mullin | OK | H | R | $4,950 | 2016 | - | |
| Steve Scalise | OK | H | R | $4,950 | 2016 | 68,367 | |
| Richard Shelby | AL | S | R | $4,950 | 2016 | - | |
| Luther Strange | AL | S | R | $4,950 | 2018 | - | |
| Lamar Smith | TX | H | R | $4,950 | 2016 | - | |
| Danny Tarkanian | NV | H | R | $4,950 | 2016 | - | |
| David Vitter | LA | S | R | $4,950 | 2016 | - | |
| David Young | IA | H | R | $4,950 | 2016 | - | |
| Ken Calvert | CA | H | R | $4,500 | 2016 | 66,657 | |
| Lisa Murkowski | AK | S | R | $4,500 | 2016 | 146,262 | |
| Tim Scott | SC | S | R | $4,500 | 2016 | 28,715 | |
| Ralph Norman | SC | H | R | $2,000 | 2018 | 12,750 | |
| Rob Bishop | UT | H | R | $4,000 | 2016 | - | |
| Rob Bishop | UT | H | R | $2,000 | 2018 | - | |
| Charlie Dent | PA | H | R | $4,000 | 2016 | - | |
| Barry Loudermilk | GA | H | R | $4,000 | 2016 | 19,305 | |
| Patrick McHenry | NC | H | R | $4,000 | 2016 | 58,668 | |
| Patrick McHenry | NC | H | R | $2,000 | 2018 | 58,668 | |
| John L. Mica | FL | H | R | $4,000 | 2016 | - | |
| Tim Walberg | MI | H | R | $4,000 | 2016 | 145,040 | |
| Tim Walberg | MI | H | R | $2,000 | 2018 | 145,040 | |
| Kevin Yoder | KS | H | R | $4,000 | 2016 | - | |
| Ron Estes | KS | H | R | $2,500 | 2018 | 13,740 | |
| Ryan Zinke | MT | H | R | $3,500 | 2016 | 22,731 | |
| Robert B. Aderholt | AL | H | R | $3,500 | 2016 | 74,695 | |
| Robert B. Aderholt | AL | H | R | $2,000 | 2018 | 74,695 | |
| Sanford Bishop | GA | H | D | $3,500 | 2016 | 50,364 | |
| Sanford Bishop | GA | H | D | $2,500 | 2018 | 50,364 | |
| Paul Chabot | CA | H | R | $3,500 | 2016 | | |
| David P. Joyce | OH | H | R | $3,500 | 2016 | | |
| David P. Joyce | OH | H | R | $2,000 | 2018 | | |
| Jason Lewis | MN | H | R | $3,500 | 2016 | | |
| Michael McCaul | TX | H | R | $3,500 | 2016 | | |
| Devin Nunes | CA | H | R | $3,500 | 2016 | | |
| Pete Olson | TX | H | R | $3,500 | 2016 | | |
| Scott W. Taylor | VA | H | R | $3,500 | 2016 | | |
| Scott Tipton | CO | H | R | $3,500 | 2016 | | |
| David Valadao | CA | H | R | $3,500 | 2016 | | |
| Ted Budd | NC | H | R | $3,000 | 2016 | | |
| Paul Cook | CA | H | R | $3,000 | 2016 | | |
| Paul Cook | CA | H | R | $2,000 | 2018 | | |
| Henry Cuellar | TX | H | D | $3,000 | 2016 | | |
| Henry Cuellar | TX | H | D | $2,000 | 2018 | | |
| Jeff Duncan | SC | H | R | $3,000 | 2016 | | |
| Jeff Duncan | SC | H | R | $2,000 | 2018 | | |
| Drew Ferguson | GA | H | R | $3,000 | 2016 | | |
| Tom Graves | GA | H | R | $3,000 | 2016 | | |
| Tom Graves | GA | H | R | $2,000 | 2018 | | |
| Duncan D. Hunter | CA | H | R | $3,000 | 2016 | | |
| Evan Jenkins | WV | H | R | $3,000 | 2016 | | |
| Steve Knight | CA | H | R | $3,000 | 2016 | | |
| Darin LaHood | IL | H | R | $3,000 | 2016 | | |
| Robert E. Latta | OH | H | R | $3,000 | 2016 | | |
| Robert E. Latta | OH | H | R | $2,000 | 2018 | | |
| Mia Love | UT | H | R | $3,000 | 2016 | | |
| Dan Newhouse | UT | H | R | $3,000 | 2016 | | |
| Erik Paulsen | MN | H | R | $3,000 | 2016 | | |
| Tom Reed | NY | H | R | $3,000 | 2016 | | |
| Chris Stewart | UT | H | R | $3,000 | 2016 | | |
| Pat Tiberi | OH | H | R | $3,000 | 2016 | | |
| Diane Black | OH | H | R | $2,500 | 2016 | | |
| Marsha Blackburn | TN | H | R | $2,500 | 2016 | | |
| Marsha Blackburn | TN | H | R | $3,500 | 2018 | | |
| John Carter | TX | H | R | $2,500 | 2016 | | |
| Doug Collins | GA | H | R | $2,500 | 2016 | | |
| Rodney Davis | IL | H | R | $2,500 | 2016 | | |
| Justin Fareed | CA | H | R | $2,500 | 2016 | | |
| Kay Granger | TX | H | R | $2,500 | 2016 | | |
| Andy Harris | MD | H | R | $2,500 | 2016 | | |
| Andy Harris | MD | H | R | $1,500 | 2018 | | |
| Clay Higgins | LA | H | R | $2,500 | 2016 | | |
| Sam Johnson | TX | H | R | $2,500 | 2016 | | |
| Scott Jones | CA | H | R | $2,500 | 2016 | | |
| Mike Lee | UT | S | R | $2,500 | 2016 | | |
| Jeff Miller | FL | H | R | $2,500 | 2016 | | |
| John Ratcliffe | TX | H | R | $2,500 | 2016 | | |
| Cathy McMorris Rodgers | WA | H | R | $2,500 | 2016 | | |
| Ed Royce | CA | H | R | $2,500 | 2016 | | |
| Pete Sessions | TX | H | R | $2,500 | 2016 | | |
| John M. Shimkus | IL | H | R | $2,500 | 2016 | | |
| John M. Shimkus | IL | H | R | $2,000 | 2018 | | |
| Adrian Smith | NE | H | R | $2,500 | 2016 | | |
| Johnny Tacherra | CA | H | R | $2,500 | 2016 | | |
| Roger Williams | TX | H | R | $2,500 | 2016 | | |
| Roger Williams | TX | H | R | $1,500 | 2018 | | |
| Jerry Moran | KS | S | R | $2,450 | 2016 | | |
| Rick W. Allen | GA | H | R | $2,000 | 2016 | | |
| Brian Babin | TX | H | R | $2,000 | 2016 | | |
| Brian Babin | TX | H | R | $1,000 | 2018 | | |
| Andy Barr | KY | H | R | $2,000 | 2016 | | |
| Joe Barton | TX | H | R | $2,000 | 2016 | | |
| Mike Bishop | MI | H | R | $2,000 | 2016 | | |
| Mike Bishop | MI | H | R | $1,000 | 2018 | | |
| Mike Bost | IL | H | R | $2,000 | 2016 | | |
| Mike Bost | IL | H | R | $1,000 | 2018 | | |
| Kevin Brady | TX | H | R | $2,000 | 2016 | | |
| Kevin Brady | TX | H | R | $2,000 | 2018 | | |
| Dave Brat | VA | H | R | $2,000 | 2016 | | |
| Dave Brat | VA | H | R | $1,000 | 2018 | | |
| James Bridenstine | OK | H | R | $2,000 | 2016 | | |
| Bradley Byrne | AL | H | R | $2,000 | 2016 | | |
| Bradley Byrne | AL | H | R | $2,000 | 2018 | | |
| Buddy Carter | GA | H | R | $2,000 | 2016 | | |
| Steve Chabot | OH | H | R | $2,000 | 2016 | | |
| Steve Chabot | OH | H | R | $2,000 | 2018 | | |
| Gus Bilirakis | FL | H | R | $2,000 | 2016 | | |
| Carlos Curbelo | FL | H | R | $2,500 | 2016 | | |
| Brian Mast | FL | H | R | $4,950 | 2016 | | |
| Bill Posey | FL | H | R | $2,000 | 2016 | | |
| Tom Rooney | FL | H | R | $2,000 | 2016 | | |
| John Rutherford | FL | H | R | $1,000 | 2016 | | |
| Daniel Webster | FL | H | R | $1,000 | 2016 | | |
| Ted Yoho | FL | H | R | $1,000 | 2016 | | |
| Jason Chaffetz | UT | H | R | $2,000 | 2016 | | |
| Chris Collins | NY | H | R | $2,000 | 2016 | | |
| Kevin Cramer | ND | H | R | $2,000 | 2016 | | |
| Kevin Cramer | ND | H | R | $5,000 | 2018 | | |
| Jeff Denham | CA | H | R | $2,000 | 2016 | | |
| Scott Desjarlais | TN | H | R | $2,000 | 2016 | | |
| Mario Diaz-Balart | FL | H | R | $2,000 | 2016 | | |
| Sean P. Duffy | WI | H | R | $2,000 | 2016 | | |
| Renee Ellmers | NC | H | R | $2,000 | 2016 | | |
| Tom Emmer | MN | H | R | $2,000 | 2016 | | |
| Blake Farenthold | TX | H | R | $2,000 | 2016 | | |
| Chuck Fleischmann | TN | H | R | $2,000 | 2016 | | |
| Bill Flores | TX | H | R | $2,000 | 2016 | | |
| Virginia Foxx | NC | H | R | $2,000 | 2016 | | |
| Trent Franks | AZ | H | R | $2,000 | 2016 | | |
| Bob Gibbs | OH | H | R | $2,000 | 2016 | | |
| Paul Gosar | AZ | H | R | $2,000 | 2016 | | |
| Trey Gowdy | SC | H | R | $2,000 | 2016 | | |
| Sam Graves | MO | H | R | $2,000 | 2016 | | |
| Morgan Griffith | VA | H | R | $2,000 | 2016 | | |
| Glenn Grothman | WI | H | R | $2,000 | 2016 | | |
| Richard Hanna | NY | H | R | $2,000 | 2016 | | |
| Gregg Harper | MS | H | R | $2,000 | 2016 | | |
| Vicky Hartzler | MO | H | R | $2,000 | 2016 | | |
| Jeb Hensarling | TX | H | R | $2,000 | 2016 | | |
| Jody Hice | GA | H | R | $2,000 | 2016 | | |
| French Hill | AR | H | R | $2,000 | 2016 | | |
| George Holding | NC | H | R | $2,000 | 2016 | | |
| Trey Hollingsworth | IN | H | R | $2,000 | 2016 | | |
| Tim Huelskamp | KS | H | R | $2,000 | 2016 | | |
| Bill Huizenga | MI | H | R | $2,000 | 2016 | | |
| Randy Hultgren | IL | H | R | $2,000 | 2016 | | |
| Darrell Issa | CA | H | R | $2,000 | 2016 | | |
| Lynn Jenkins | KS | H | R | $2,000 | 2016 | | |
| Bill Johnson | OH | H | R | $2,000 | 2016 | | |
| Jim Jordan | OH | H | R | $2,000 | 2016 | | |
| Trent Kelly | MS | H | R | $2,000 | 2016 | | |
| Steve King | IA | H | R | $2,000 | 2016 | | |
| Adam Kinzinger | IL | H | R | $2,000 | 2016 | | |
| David Kustoff | TN | H | R | $2,000 | 2016 | | |
| David Kustoff | TN | H | R | $2,000 | 2018 | | |
| Doug LaMalfa | CA | H | R | $2,000 | 2016 | | |
| Douglas L. Lamborn | CO | H | R | $2,000 | 2016 | | |
| Billy Long | MO | H | R | $2,000 | 2016 | | |
| Frank D. Lucas | OK | H | R | $2,000 | 2016 | | |
| Blaine Luetkemeyer | MO | H | R | $2,000 | 2016 | | |
| Tom Marino | PA | H | R | $2,000 | 2016 | | |
| Tom McClintock | CA | H | R | $2,000 | 2016 | | |
| Luke Messer | IN | H | R | $2,000 | 2016 | | |
| John Moolenaar | MI | H | R | $2,000 | 2016 | | |
| Alex Mooney | WV | H | R | $2,000 | 2016 | | |
| Mick Mulvaney | SC | H | R | $2,000 | 2016 | | |
| Tim Murphy | PA | H | R | $2,000 | 2016 | | |
| Kristi Noem | SD | H | R | $2,000 | 2016 | | |
| Gary Palmer | AL | H | R | $2,000 | 2016 | | |
| Steve Pearce | NM | H | R | $2,000 | 2016 | | |
| Scott Perry | PA | H | R | $2,000 | 2016 | | |
| Collin Peterson | MN | H | D | $2,000 | 2016 | | |
| Collin Peterson | MN | H | D | $2,500 | 2018 | | |
| Robert Pittenger | NC | H | R | $2,000 | 2016 | | |
| Ted Poe | TX | H | R | $2,000 | 2016 | | |
| Ted Poe | TX | H | R | $2,000 | 2018 | | |
| Mike Pompeo | KS | H | R | $2,000 | 2016 | | |
| Tom Price | GA | H | R | $2,000 | 2016 | | |
| Jim Renacci | OH | H | R | $2,000 | 2016 | | |
| Tom Rice | SC | H | R | $2,000 | 2016 | | |
| Martha Roby | AL | H | R | $2,000 | 2016 | | |
| Hal Rogers | KY | H | R | $2,000 | 2016 | | |
| Mike D. Rogers | AL | H | R | $2,000 | 2016 | | |
| Mike D. Rogers | AL | H | R | $2,000 | 2018 | | |
| Todd Rokita | IN | H | R | $2,000 | 2016 | | |
| Peter Roskam | IL | H | R | $2,000 | 2016 | | |
| Dennis A. Ross | FL | H | R | $2,000 | 2016 | | |
| Keith J. Rothfus | PA | H | R | $2,000 | 2016 | | |
| David Rouzer | NC | H | R | $2,000 | 2016 | | |
| Steven Russell | OK | H | R | $2,000 | 2016 | | |
| Mark Sanford | SC | H | R | $2,000 | 2016 | | |
| Austin Scott | GA | H | R | $2,000 | 2016 | | |
| Mike Simpson | ID | H | R | $2,000 | 2016 | | |
| Jason Smith | MO | H | R | $2,000 | 2016 | | |
| Jason Smith | MO | H | R | $1,500 | 2018 | | |
| Elise Stefanik | NY | H | R | $2,000 | 2016 | | |
| Steve Stivers | OH | H | R | $2,000 | 2016 | | |
| Steve Stivers | OH | H | R | $2,500 | 2018 | | |
| Kathy Szeliga | MD | H | R | $2,000 | 2016 | | |
| Glenn Thompson | PA | H | R | $2,000 | 2016 | | |
| Mac Thornberry | TX | H | R | $2,000 | 2016 | | |
| Dave Trott | MI | H | R | $2,000 | 2016 | | |
| Michael R. Turner | OH | H | R | $2,000 | 2016 | | |
| Ann Wagner | MO | H | R | $2,000 | 2016 | | |
| Greg Walden | OR | H | R | $2,000 | 2016 | | |
| Mark Walker | NC | H | R | $2,000 | 2016 | | |
| Jackie Walorski | IN | H | R | $2,000 | 2016 | | |
| Jackie Walorski | IN | H | R | $2,000 | 2018 | | |
| Mimi Walters | CA | H | R | $2,000 | 2016 | | |
| Tim Walz | MN | H | D | $2,000 | 2016 | | |
| Brad Wenstrup | OH | H | R | $2,000 | 2016 | | |
| Joe Wilson | SC | H | R | $2,000 | 2016 | | |
| Rob Wittman | VA | H | R | $2,000 | 2016 | | |
| Neal Dunn | FL | H | R | $1,750 | 2016 | | |
| Neal Dunn | FL | H | R | $2,750 | 2018 | | |
| Steven Palazzo | MS | H | R | $1,750 | 2016 | | |
| Steven Palazzo | MS | H | R | $2,000 | 2018 | | |
| Mark Amodei | NV | H | R | $1,500 | 2016 | | |
| Mark Amodei | NV | H | R | $1,000 | 2018 | | |
| Mike Conaway | TX | H | R | $1,500 | 2016 | | |
| Mike Conaway | TX | H | R | $2,500 | 2018 | | |
| Mike Kelly | PA | H | R | $1,500 | 2016 | | |
| Steve Womack | AR | H | R | $1,500 | 2016 | | |
| Mark Meadows | NC | H | R | $1,150 | 2016 | | |
| Ralph Abraham | LA | H | R | $1,000 | 2016 | | |
| Ralph Abraham | LA | H | R | $1,000 | 2018 | | |
| Scott Angelle | LA | H | R | $1,000 | 2016 | | |
| Jodey Arrington | TX | H | R | $1,000 | 2016 | | |
| Jodey Arrington | TX | H | R | $1,000 | 2018 | | |
| Paul Babeu | AZ | H | R | $1,000 | 2016 | | |
| Jim Banks | IN | H | R | $1,000 | 2016 | | |
| Jim Banks | IN | H | R | $1,000 | 2018 | | |
| Lou Barletta | PA | H | R | $1,000 | 2016 | | |
| Dan Benishek | MI | H | R | $1,000 | 2016 | | |
| Jaime Herrera Beutler | WA | H | R | $1,000 | 2016 | | |
| Andy Biggs | AZ | H | R | $1,000 | 2016 | | |
| Andy Biggs | AZ | H | R | $2,000 | 2018 | | |
| Mo Brooks | AL | H | R | $1,000 | 2016 | | |
| Susan Brooks | IN | H | R | $1,000 | 2016 | | |
| Larry Bucshon | IN | H | R | $1,000 | 2016 | | |
| Michael Burgess | TX | H | R | $1,000 | 2016 | | |
| Michael Burgess | TX | H | R | $2,000 | 2018 | | |
| Dan Carter | CT | S | R | $1,000 | 2016 | | |
| Liz Cheney | WY | H | R | $1,000 | 2016 | | |
| John A. Barrasso | WY | S | R | $1,000 | 2018 | | |
| Rick Crawford | AR | H | R | $1,000 | 2016 | | |
| Ander Crenshaw | FL | H | R | $1,000 | 2016 | | |
| Warren Davidson | OH | H | R | $1,000 | 2016 | | |
| Ron DeSantis | FL | H | R | $1,000 | 2016 | | |
| John Fleming | LA | H | R | $1,000 | 2016 | | |
| Randy Forbes | VA | H | R | $1,000 | 2016 | | |
| Jeff Fortenberry | NE | H | R | $1,000 | 2016 | | |
| Matt Gaetz | FL | H | R | $1,000 | 2016 | | |
| Tom Garrett | VA | H | R | $1,000 | 2016 | | |
| Darryl Glenn | CO | S | R | $1,000 | 2016 | | |
| Louie Gohmert | TX | H | R | $1,000 | 2016 | | |
| Brett Guthrie | KY | H | R | $1,000 | 2016 | | |
| Mark Holbrook | ME | H | R | $1,000 | 2016 | | |
| Robert Hurt | VA | H | R | $1,000 | 2016 | | |
| Mike Johnson | LA | H | R | $1,000 | 2016 | | |
| Walter B. Jones Jr. | NC | H | R | $1,000 | 2016 | | |
| Raul Labrador | ID | H | R | $1,000 | 2016 | | |
| Frank LoBiondo | NJ | H | R | $1,000 | 2016 | | |
| Kenny Marchant | TX | H | R | $1,000 | 2016 | | |
| Roger Marshall | KS | H | R | $1,000 | 2016 | | |
| Roger Marshall | KS | H | R | $2,500 | 2018 | | |
| Kevin McCarthy | CA | H | R | $1,000 | 2016 | | |
| David McKinley | WV | H | R | $1,000 | 2016 | | |
| Paul Mitchell | MI | H | R | $1,000 | 2016 | | |
| Paul Mitchell | MI | H | R | $2,000 | 2018 | | |
| Dave Reichert | WA | H | R | $1,000 | 2016 | | |
| Dana Rohrabacher | CA | H | R | $1,000 | 2016 | | |
| Francis Rooney | FL | H | R | $1,000 | 2016 | | |
| David Schweikert | AZ | H | R | $1,000 | 2016 | | |
| Jim Sensenbrenner | WI | H | R | $1,000 | 2016 | | |
| Fred Upton | MI | H | R | $1,000 | 2016 | | |
| Randy Weber | TX | H | R | $1,000 | 2016 | | |
| Bruce Westerman | AR | H | R | $1,000 | 2016 | | |
| Kelli Ward | AZ | S | R | $500 | 2016 | | |
| John McCain | AZ | S | R | $300 | 2016 | | |
| Ted Cruz | TX | S | R | $350 | 2016 | | |
| Ted Cruz | TX | S | R | $2,000 | 2018 | | |
| Susan Narvaiz | TX | H | R | $250 | 2016 | | |
