= Bruce Stern =

Bruce Stern (September 25, 1942 – July 18, 2007) was an American attorney and gun collector. He served on the board of directors of the National Rifle Association of America.

Stern graduated from the Wharton School at the University of Pennsylvania in 1964 and earned his J.D. at NYU, and his master's degree at the University of Bridgeport. A Captain in the U.S. Army, Stern was a Vietnam veteran, serving at Long Binh, and was a member of American Legion Post 141. In addition to his legal career, Stern was the founder and president of the Coalition of Connecticut Sportsmen, and a contributing writer to its magazine, Hook 'N' Bullet. He died on July 18, 2007.

== Firearms Collection ==
Stern amassed an historically significant collection of more than 4,000 rare and high-condition military firearms. These were disposed of in a series of auctions following his death. One session set a new world record of $12.7M for the highest grossing firearms auction, although firearms from Stern's collection only formed part of that auction.

After his death, Stern's collection achieved a legendary status online due to its size and quality, but also in part due to a series of photographs circulating since at least 2008. The images of an extensive gun room and museum-grade collection have been variously attributed to Stern, Charlton Heston, and Robert Starer of Historic Arms in Virginia. However, a 2009 investigation by Snopes did not establish a connection between the collection and any of these individuals.
