= George Kollitides =

American business executive

George K. Kollitides II
- Born: United States
- Education: Lafayette College, Columbia University in the City of New York
- Occupations: Business executive, private equity investor
- Known for: Was CEO of Remington arms 2012-2015
- Spouse: Karen Kollitides

George K. Kollitides II is an American private equity and business executive with a focus on business services, light industrial and consumer industries. During his career he has served as the chairman, CEO, president or lead director of a number of companies and organisations.

Kollitides was the Chairman and CEO of gun maker Freedom Group between 2012 and 2015 after Cerberus Capital Management bought the firm.

== Professional career ==
Kollitides started his career at General Electric Capital, where he worked in Corporate Finance, Restructuring and Private Equity. After attending Columbia Business School, he became a principal at Catterton Partners, a global consumer and retail-focused private equity firm.

He then went on to co-found TenX Capital Management, a private equity firm. Kollitides and the TenX team eventually joined Cerberus Capital Management LP, a global institutional investment management firm.

Kollitides is currently a partner and co-head of A&M Capital Opportunities, a middle-market private equity firm, where he sits on the Investment and Conflicts committees. He also sits on the boards of Worldwise, Inc., a growing pet product company, Frontier Dermatology, LLC, the largest dermatology practice in the Pacific Northwest and the seventeenth largest in the U.S., adMarketplace, a search advertiser, Precision Aero Gear Group, LLC, a manufacturer of critical gears for aerospace and defense, Teach for America Connecticut, a non-profit organization whose mission is to support our nation’s most promising future leaders, and he is the President-Elect of the New Canaan (CT) Youth Football Board of Directors.

== Clubs and associations ==
Kollitides served on the Hunting and Wildlife Conservation Committee of the National Rifle Association of America (NRA) and was a member of the New York State Rifle and Pistol Association. In 2009 he ran for a seat on the NRA Board. Kollitides is a trustee of the NRA Foundation.

Kollitides is an active member of the Young Presidents Gold Organization (YPO Gold) and also serves on the Advancement Committee of the Institute for the Study of War.

Kollitides previously served on the Lafayette College Trustees’ Financial Policy Committee, as the vice chairman of the Orthopedic Foundation for Active Lifestyles, a director of Good Sports New York Advisory Board, a Trustee of the Bridgeport Hospital Foundation, a board member of DOMUS, a residential program for vulnerable Connecticut youth, and as a volunteer fireman for 10 years.

== Awards and recognitions ==
Kollitides was ranked by Sports One Source as one of 40 under 40 in the sporting goods industry in 2009. Kollitides was also honored with the Orthopedic Foundation for Active Lifestyles 2010 Philanthropy Leadership Award.
