= March for Our Lives (demonstration) =

2018 and 2022 student-led demonstration in Washington, DC

- Part of Gun politics in the United States and Protests against Donald Trump
- Date: March 24, 2018; 8 years ago
- Location: Washington, D.C.
- Type: Demonstration
- Theme: Gun violence in the United States
- Cause: Parkland high school shooting
- Organized by: Students attending the Marjory Stoneman Douglas High School (Never Again MSD)
- Participants: Trevon Bosley; Sarah Chadwick; Edna Chavez; Jaclyn Corin; Ryan Deitsch; Aalayah Eastmond; X González; David Hogg; Cameron Kasky; Yolanda King; Matt Post; 1.2 million people in the United States, and more around the world.
- Website: marchforourlives.org

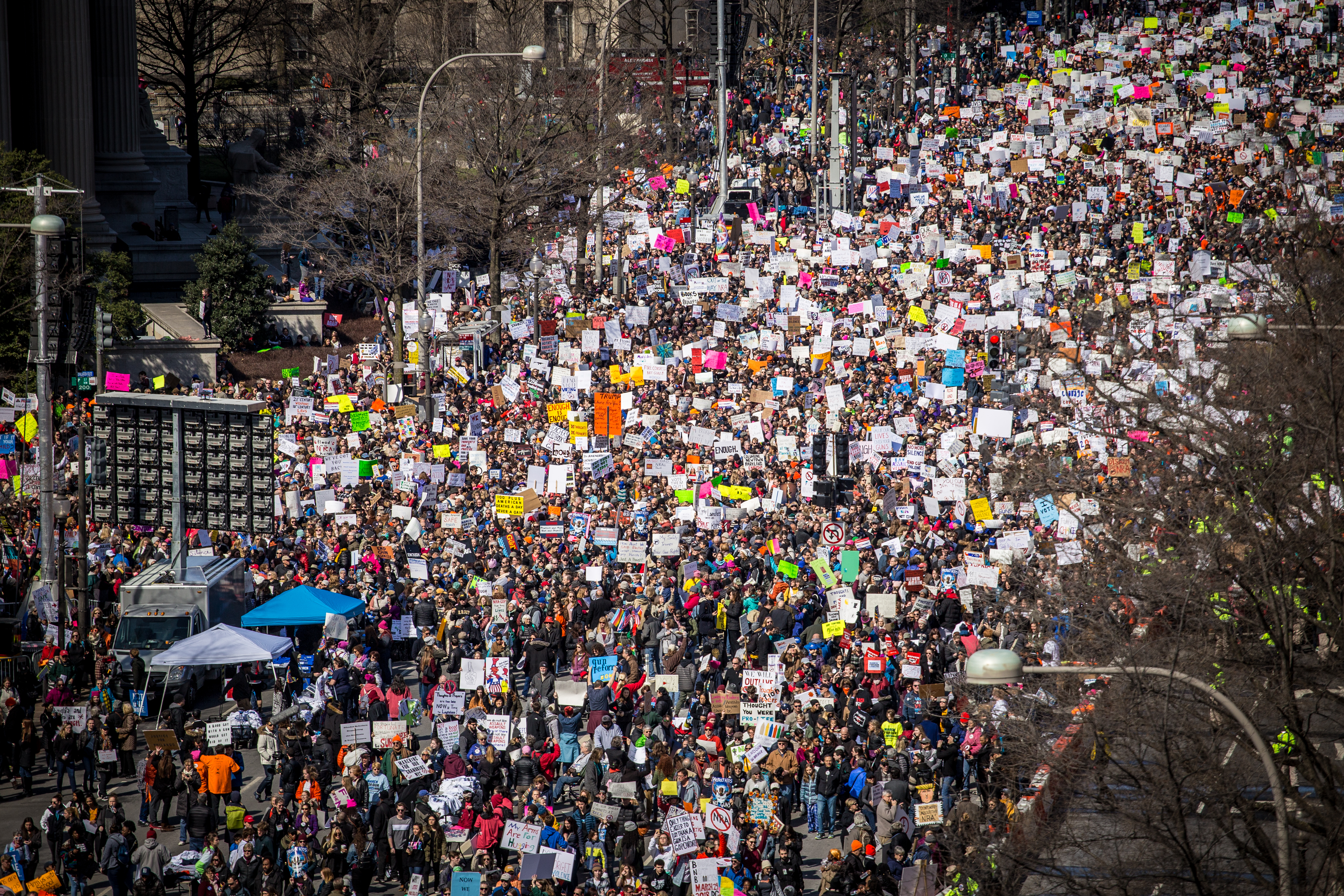
Crowd on Pennsylvania Avenue (Washington, D.C.)

March for Our Lives (MFOL) is a student-led American organization which leads demonstrations in support of gun control legislation. The first demonstration took place in Washington, D.C., on March 24, 2018, with over 880 sibling events throughout the United States and around the world, and was planned by Never Again MSD in collaboration with the nonprofit organization Everytown for Gun Safety. The event followed the Parkland high school shooting a month earlier, which was described by several media outlets as a possible tipping point for gun control legislation.

Protesters urged for universal background checks on all gun sales, closing of the gun show loophole, a restoration of the 1994 Federal Assault Weapons Ban, and a ban on the sale of high-capacity magazines and bump stocks in the United States. Turnout was estimated to be between 1.2 and 2 million people in the United States, making it one of the largest protests in American history.

After the Robb Elementary School Shooting in Uvalde, Texas, MFOL Action Fund organized another nationwide protest on June 11, 2022. The main protest took place in Washington, D.C., with hundreds of sibling events taking place across the United States.

== Planning ==
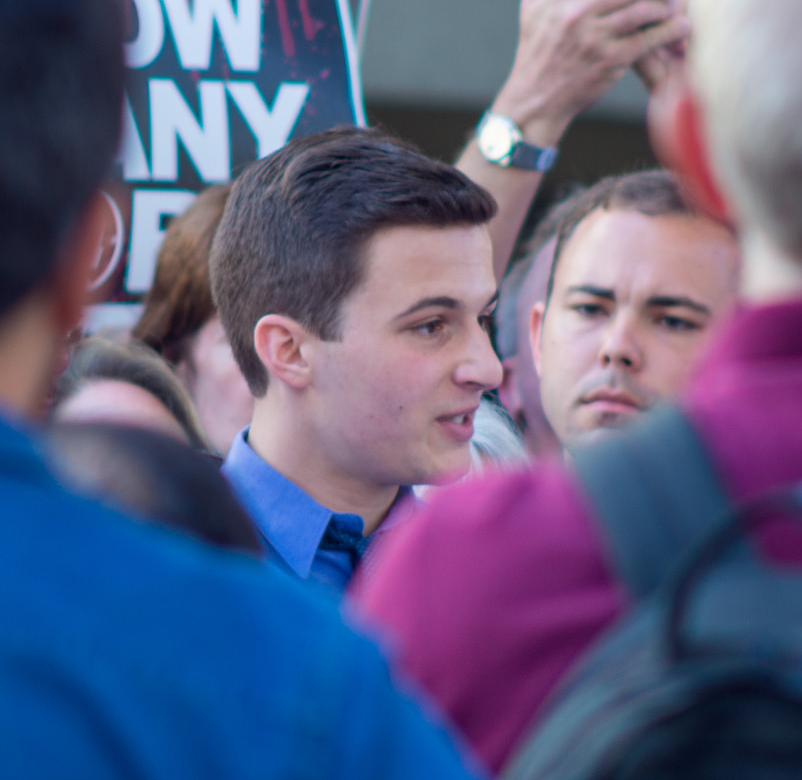
Cameron Kasky at a rally in February 2018

Cameron Kasky, a junior at Marjory Stoneman Douglas High School in Parkland, Florida, and his classmates, announced the march on February 18, four days after the shooting at the school. Also joining the march efforts were Alex Wind of Stoneman Douglas High School, who along with four friends created the "Never Again" campaign. X González and David Hogg, also survivors of the shooting, have been vocal supporters of the march.

External videos
- March For Our Lives Rally, Washington, D.C., March 24, 2018, C-SPAN

The date was chosen in order to give students, families and others a chance to mourn first, and then on March 24, talk about gun control. Organizers filed a permit application with the National Park Service during the week of February 23, and expected as many as 500,000 people to attend. However, the National Mall, which was the planned site of the main march in Washington, D.C., was reportedly already booked for March 24; the application, filed by an unidentified local student group, claimed it was for a talent show. A permit was later obtained for Pennsylvania Avenue. The Washington Metropolitan Area Transit Authority announced it would operate extra trains for the march.

The Enough! National School Walkout was held on the one month anniversary of the Stoneman Douglas shooting. It involved students walking out from their classes for exactly 17 minutes (one for each of the victims of the massacre) and involved more than 3,000 schools across the United States and nearly one million students. Thousands of students also gathered and staged a rally in Washington, D.C., after observing 17 minutes of silence with their backs to the White House. After the success of the walkout, Hogg posted a tweet that included a provocative, NRA-style advertisement calling out lawmakers for their inaction on or opposition to gun control efforts, asking "What if our politicians weren't the bitch of the NRA?", and ending with a promotion for the upcoming March.

=== Celebrity and corporate support ===
George Clooney and Scooter Braun were major forces behind the organization of the march, and aided in fundraising efforts behind the scenes. Amal and George Clooney donated $500,000 to support the march and announced they would attend. Oprah Winfrey matched the Clooney donation to support the march. Jeffrey Katzenberg and his wife Marilyn also contributed $500,000. Film director and producer Steven Spielberg and actress Kate Capshaw Spielberg donated $500,000, also matching the donation of the Clooneys. On February 23, Gucci announced they were also donating $500,000 towards the march. Other people and organizations offering support have included Selena Gomez, Justin Bieber, Gabby Giffords, Lauren Jauregui, Alyssa Milano, Moms Demand Action, Amy Schumer, St. Vincent, Harry Styles, Hayley Williams, Paul McCartney, Kanye West, and Kim Kardashian. John Legend and Chrissy Teigen donated $25,000. Jimmy Fallon pledged to attend an event with his family. Samantha Bee interviewed kids. Jim Jefferies interviewed participants in San Diego. Other celebrities including Taylor Swift have donated an undisclosed amount of money toward the campaign. Justin Timberlake, Will Smith, Cher and Amy Poehler also participated in the march.

James Corden promoted the March for Our Lives event. John Zimmer and Logan Green, the co-founders of Lyft, announced their support of the rallies and stated that their company would provide free rides for those attending demonstrations. Bumble CEO Whitney Wolfe Herd subsequently announced that they were supporting the NeverAgain movement by banning all images of firearms on their dating application.

John Cena and Millie Bobby Brown applauded the March for Our Lives event at the Kids Choice Awards.

The founding members of MFOL were awarded Smithsonian magazine's 2018 American Ingenuity Award in the Youth category.

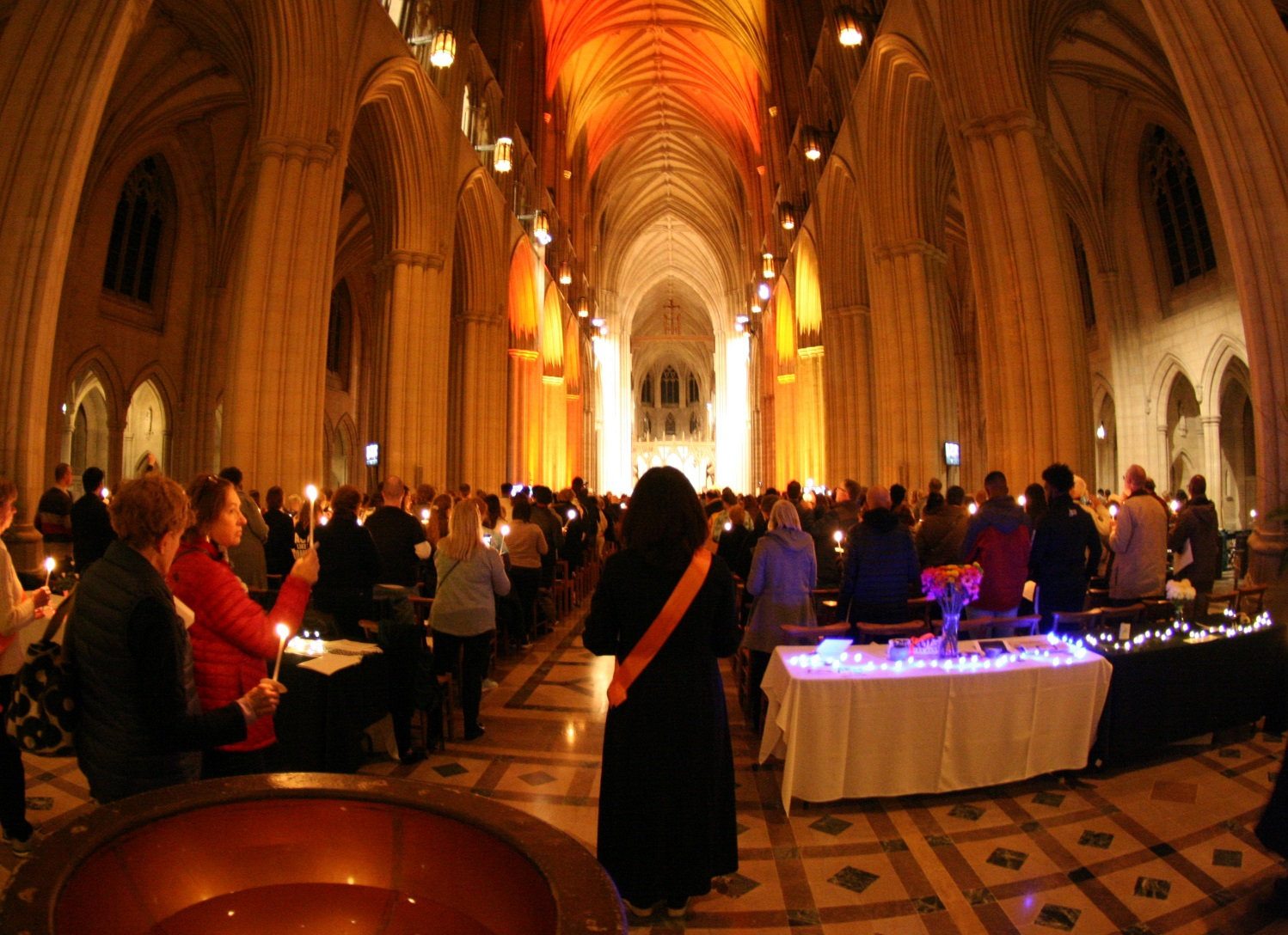
Prayer and vigil at the Washington National Cathedral

In Washington, D.C., a prayer and vigil was held at the Washington National Cathedral on the eve of the rally, as a memorial for the victims of gun violence, and to declare the church's belief, "This work is rooted in our commitment to Jesus' command to love our neighbors as ourselves... We gather out of a conviction that the right to bear arms does not trump the right to life." The litany also included the following refrain:

From so many heartbreaks comes forth a united commitment to go into the streets of our cities and towns and promote a way of peace and well-being for all people. With compassion sown from the threads of sadness and terror, we will mend a nation tattered by gun violence and weave a new cloth of hope and peace.

Guest speakers included Philip and April Schentrup, parents of 16-year-old Carmen Schentrup, who was killed in the shooting in Parkland, Florida.

== Participation ==
Portion of speech by David Hogg

March for Our Lives was among the biggest youth-led protests since the Vietnam War era. Estimates of participation at the main event in Washington, D.C., range from 200,000 to 800,000.

The speakers—all of whom were high schoolers or younger—included Marjory Stoneman Douglas students Cameron Kasky, David Hogg, Delaney Tarr, Sarah Chadwick, Alex Wind, Jaclyn Corin, Ryan Deitsch, Aalayah Eastmond, Samantha Fuentes, and X González. Hunter Pollack, brother of victim Meadow, was scheduled to speak, but did not attend due to a logistical issue, which he contended was a result of being misled by event officials. David Hogg tweeted out a video of Hunter's speech from a later event.

Other participants included Naomi Wadler, who was an elementary school student in Alexandria, Virginia, Trevon Bosley from Chicago whose brother was shot and killed leaving church, Edna Lizbeth Chávez, a high school student from Los Angeles, and Zion Kelly, whose twin brother was shot and killed during an armed robbery. Yolanda Renee King, granddaughter of Martin Luther King Jr., also made an appearance along with Mya Middleton, a student from Chicago representing After School Matters, Matt Post, a senior from Montgomery County, Christopher Underwood, an 11-year old from New York, Alex King and D'Angelo McDade from Chicago, and Matthew Soto, brother of Sandy Hook victim Victoria Soto, and Parkland parents Lori Alhadeff, who lost her daughter Alyssa in the school incident and Manuel & Patricia Oliver, who lost their son Joaquin and launched a campaign titled "Change The Ref" to honor their son and push for new restrictions on any form of weapon violence.

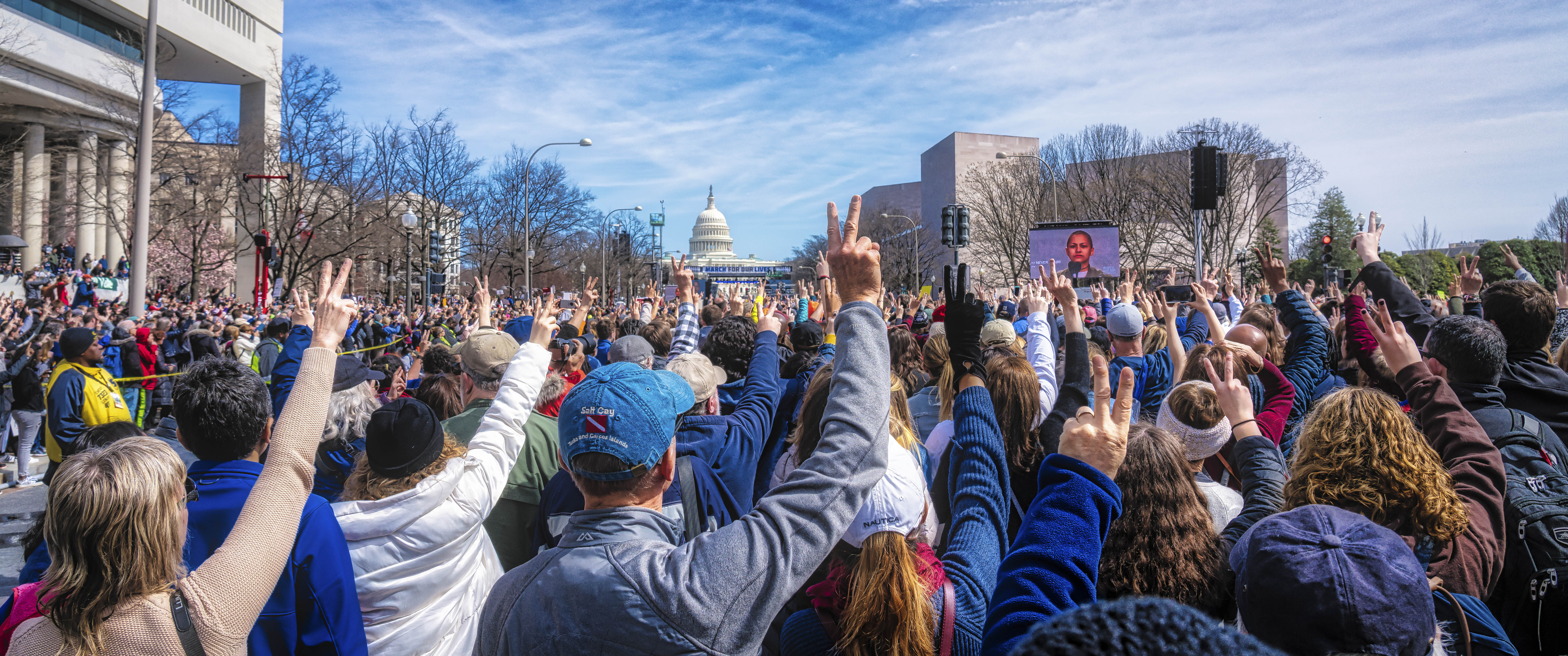
X González seen on a Jumbotron in the distance during their moment of silence

González, after speaking and naming the 17 victims, stood silent for over four minutes, after which a cellphone alarm went off and they announced the six minute and twenty second point in their speech, equal to the length of the Parkland shooting. González ended their speech saying,

Since the time that I came out here, it has been 6 minutes and 20 seconds. The shooter has ceased shooting, and will soon abandon his rifle, blend in with the students as they escape, and walk free for an hour before arrest. Fight for your lives before it's someone else's job.

then walked off stage as the entire crowd along Pennsylvania Avenue applauded loudly. Their speech and emotional moment of silence was praised by media organizations as one of the "most memorable" and "powerful" moments in the day's events.

Singers Ariana Grande, Lin-Manuel Miranda, Ben Platt, Miley Cyrus, Jennifer Hudson, Andra Day, Common, Demi Lovato and Vic Mensa joined student-led marchers in Washington, D.C.

Throughout the nation, other participators who took to the stage or in the crowd in D.C. included Kanye West & Kim Kardashian, George & Amal Clooney, Glenn Close, Cher, Miley Cyrus' sister Noah, Steven Spielberg, Julianne Moore, and Lauren Jauregui of Fifth Harmony in D.C. as well as Arizona Representative Gabby Giffords, who survived weapon violence in the 2011 Tucson shooting and marching and paying tribute for the six victims who died at her Congressional Rally back then in 2011.

Celebrities who took part in the rally in Los Angeles included Laura Dern, Reese Witherspoon, Olivia Wilde with Jason Sudeikis, Mason Cook, Jaden & Willow Smith, Yara Shahidi, Meg Donnelly, Roots Drummer Questlove, Amy Schumer, Lady Gaga, Charlie Puth, Mae Whitman, Connie Britton, Rita Ora, Ta'Rhonda Jones, Miles Heizer, Kendall & Kylie Jenner, Hailey Baldwin, Leona Lewis, Anjelica Huston, and singer and music executive Diane Warren along with city's mayor Eric Garcetti and Senator Kamala Harris.

During the rally in Miami Beach, musicians Flo Rida and Gloria & Emilio Estefan's daughter Emily took part in a Miami Beach rally with Mayor Dan Gelber.

Actor Matthew McConaughey took part in the march in Austin, Texas, and other singer-songwriters included Paul Simon, who performed "Sound of Silence" in Stamford, Connecticut, and Brandi Carlile who sung "Hold Out Your Hand", following the release of her sixth studio album "By the Way, I Forgive You", which was released two days after the Parkland tragedy. (The song later became a music video on June 1, 2018, showing montage recap clips of protestors being guided by officers on motorcycle while Brandi is blending in with the crowd and is later seen performing on the front lawn of the Seattle Center.)

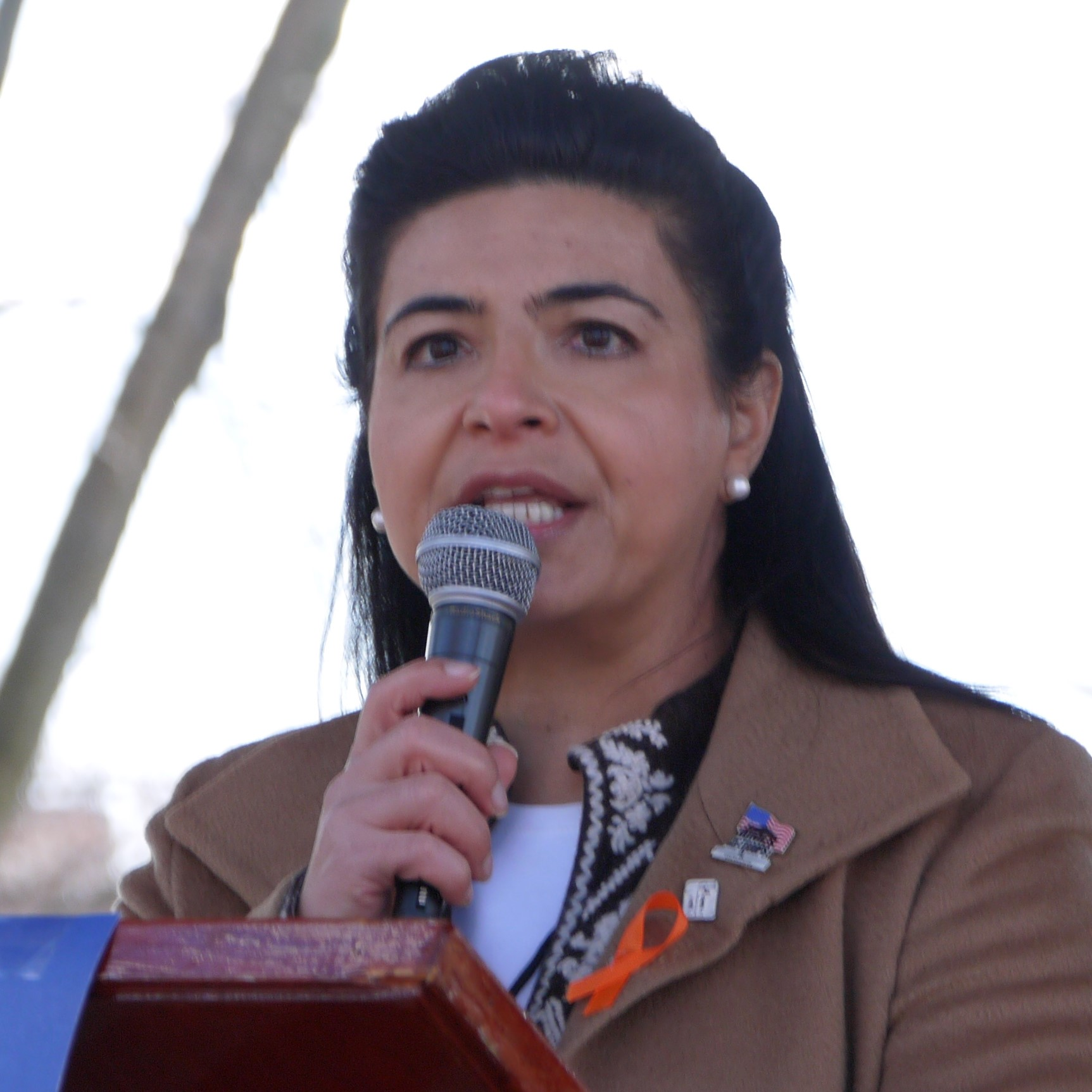
New York State Senator Anna Kaplan addresses a March for Our Lives Rally on March 24, 2018

Politicians included Andrew Yang, who took part in Annapolis along with Mayor Gavin Buckley, Maryland, Nashville Mayor David Briley, Washington, D.C. Mayor Muriel Bowser, Georgia Congressman John Lewis (who took part in Atlanta and paid tribute for his colleague Dr. Martin Luther King Jr., John Fitzgerald and Robert Francis Kennedy, all of whom died from weapon violence), Representative Joseph Kennedy III in the event in Boston, Massachusetts Senator Elizabeth Warren, who snapped a few selfies during a march in Springfield, New York State Senator Anna Kaplan in New York, and New York Governor Andrew Cuomo during the New York City event along with Mayor Bill De Blasio and Black Lives Matter President, Hawk Newsome as well as TV host Nick Cannon.

Other advocates/activists included Malala Yousafzai, who gave a warm introduction via a video monitor during the Washington March.

== Responses ==
=== National Rifle Association ===
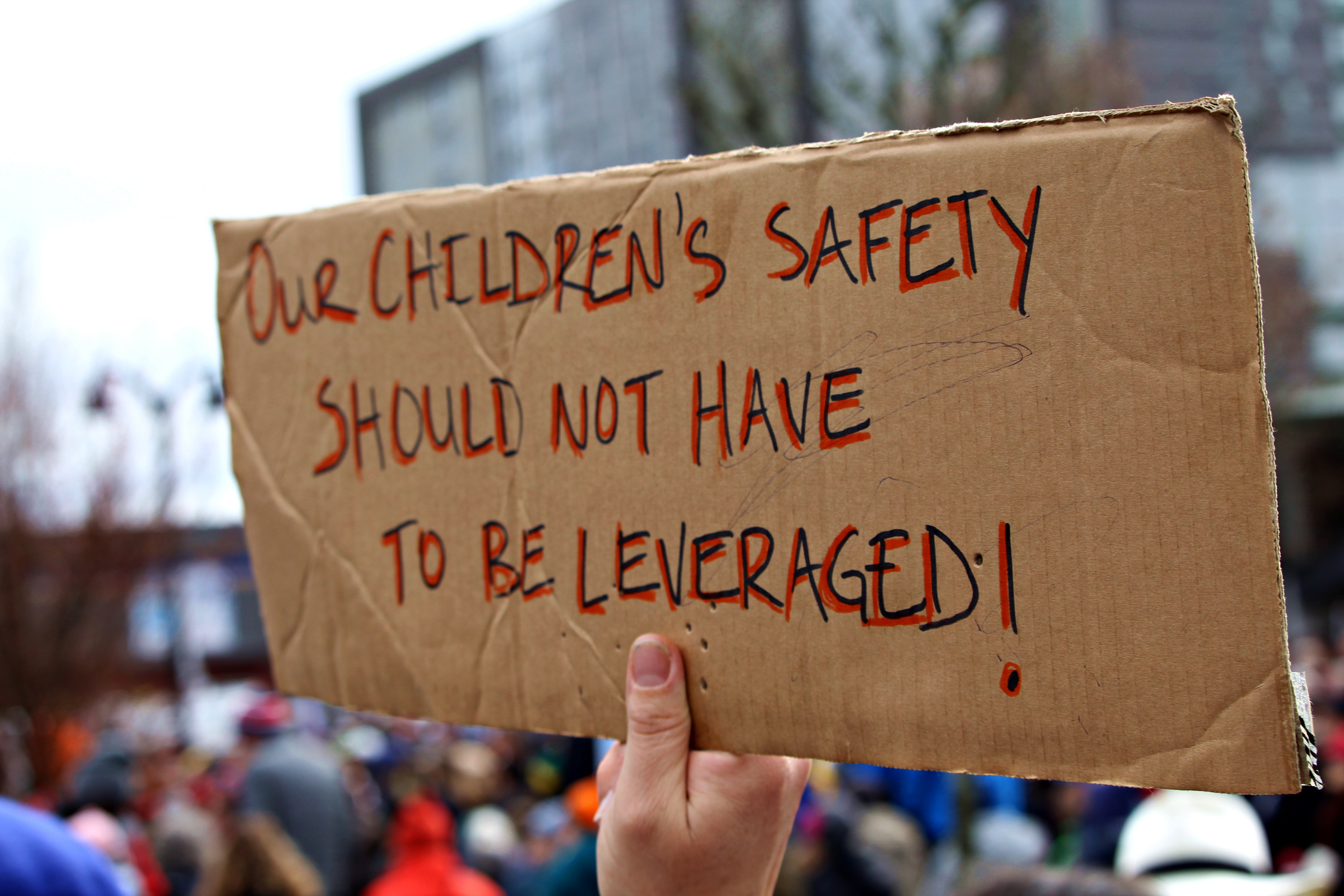
A poster saying "Our children's safety should not have to be leveraged"

On March 21, NRATV host Grant Stinchfield stated that "March for Our Lives is backed by radicals with a history of violent threats, language and actions"; fact-checker PolitiFact has rated this statement as being "without merit" and "Pants on Fire" indicating that it is a "ridiculous claim".

While the march was occurring, the NRA posted a membership drive video on their Facebook page, declaring that the "protests aren't spontaneous. Gun-hating billionaires and Hollywood elites are manipulating and exploiting children as part of their plan to DESTROY the Second Amendment". Another video dubbed "A March for Their Lies" was uploaded to YouTube featuring Colion Noir, in which he described the planned rally as a "carnival of a march". Noir also said in the video that there is an "agenda that's a million times bigger than the guns".

=== Politicians ===
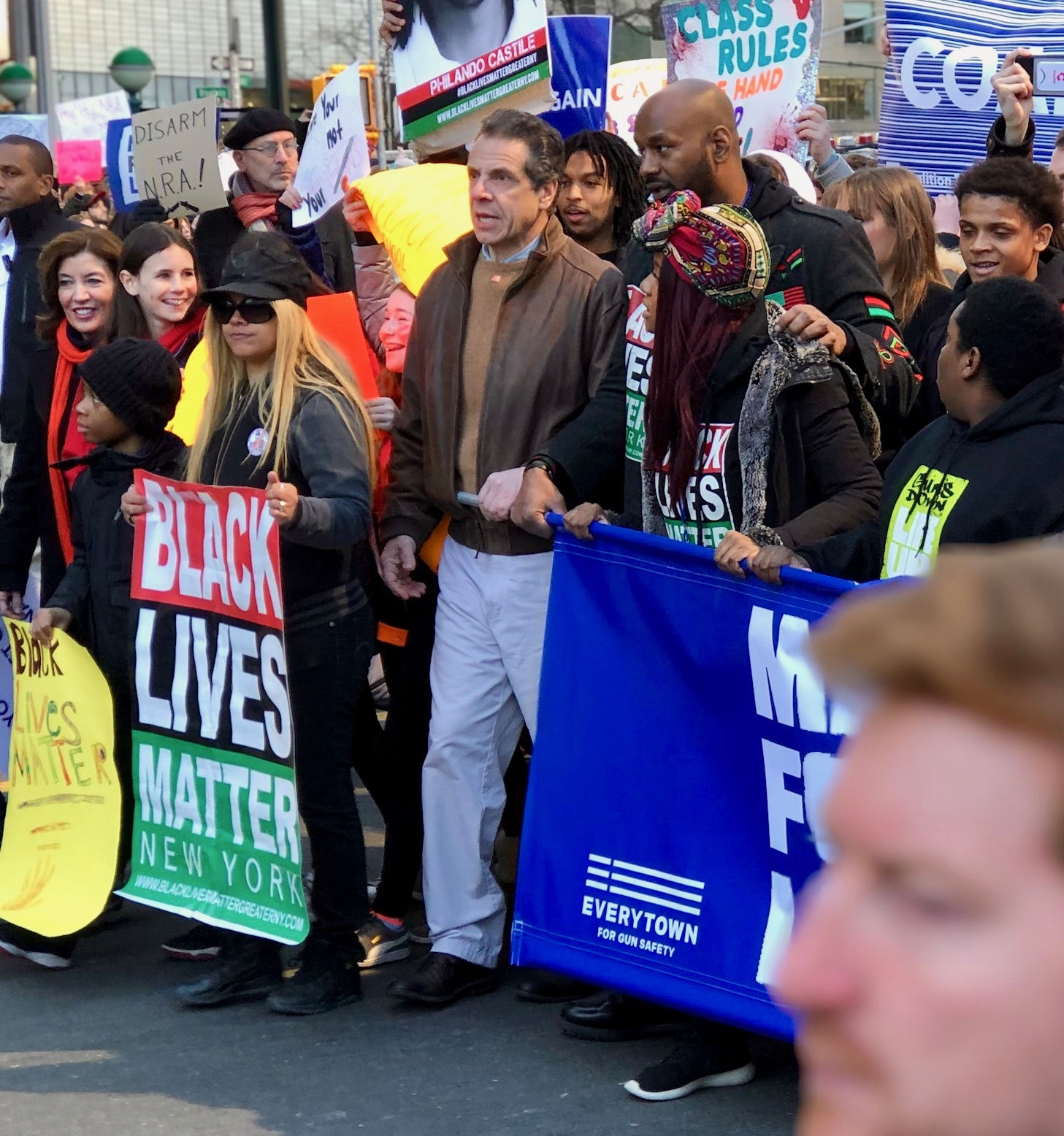
The Governor of New York, Andrew Cuomo, leading the NYC March For Our Lives rally

The Washington Post reported that there were many Democrats encouraging the marchers, and many of them, including candidates for office, participated from the sidelines in the march, but few Republicans did similarly. The White House said in a response that they "applaud the many courageous young Americans exercising their first amendment rights."

On the day of the protests, Florida Republican senator Marco Rubio responded by stating: "However, many other Americans do not support a gun ban" and "view banning guns as an infringement on the Second Amendment rights of law abiding citizens that ultimately will not prevent these tragedies." He called for protesters to find "common ground with those who hold opposing views" for change to happen. However, a blanket gun ban was not called for by the protests.

Former Republican senator and presidential candidate Rick Santorum criticized the Parkland activists, suggesting during an interview with CNN that students should be learning ways to respond to a shooter rather than asking lawmakers "to solve their problem"; Santorum advised students to take classes in CPR rather than marching in Washington. The Washington Post quoted several doctors responding to Santorum that CPR would not be at all effective on gunshot victims as they were suffering from blood loss.

=== Media ===
A report in The New Yorker praised the leaders of the march for their "extraordinary inclusiveness" in that they expanded the focus of concern from suburban schools to those of urban neighborhoods as well.

Libertarian magazine Reason criticized the march, saying that "Gun violence has declined precipitously over the past 25 years, and most Americans are much safer today than they were a generation ago." and that "mass shootings are not the norm, and kids don't need to be terrified of going to school."

On social media, fake pictures and GIFs of X González tearing up a copy of the U.S. Constitution were circulated in an effort to discredit the march. The images were doctored from originals of González tearing up a shooting target sign. Actor and conservative commentator Adam Baldwin defended circulating the doctored images as "political satire."

== Use of social media ==
Previously, protests had occurred for multiple shootings in the United States, such as the 2015 Charleston church shooting, but never had they amassed more than several hundred participants. With social media, more information was relayed to a larger audience in quicker time, giving more people awareness of what was happening across the nation. By National Walkout Day on April 20, 2018, the social medias had followings over 1.3 million people and in Washington, D.C., alone, 200,000 people attended the March For Our Lives protest, whom many younger adults attributed to the big social media presence. The hashtag #MarchForOurLives was used 3.6 million times, and over 7.5 thousand tweets were directed at the NRA social media account.

=== Twitter ===
The movement originated after the Parkland shooting in Florida, where 17 individuals died. During the shooting, multiple students used Twitter, including freshman Aidan Minoff, who tweeted, "I am in a school shooting right now..." Twitter allowed others around the world to suddenly be aware of what was happening in real time and showing the raw emotion of these students. Twitter supported greater two-way communication between the organization and the audience than traditional news media outlets.

The March For Our Lives Twitter started in February 2018, with the Twitter handle, @AMarch4OurLives. Up to date, the Twitter account has 450,000 followers and are a student-run organization with a large social media presence. The March For Our Lives Twitter has real time, up to date tweets about the movement. It includes tweets about the red flag bill being signed in from other March For Our Lives accounts based in different locations, such as NYC. In addition, the March For Our Lives Twitter account also alerts their followers about the events that are happening, such as meetings at Town Halls or when certain protests are happening.

=== Instagram ===
In March 2018, Selena Gomez shared the march's hashtag #MarchForOurLives with the message: "Protect kids, not guns!" and this post had received 2 million likes. Lady Gaga also documented the march, releasing a series of Instagram videos calling for action from politicians to enforce stricter gun laws. The march has drawn support from Taylor Swift, Miley Cyrus, Kim Kardashian, Ariana Grande, and they have pledged to join and perform at the march.

The students who survived the Stoneman Douglas High School shooting and millions of students worldwide participated in March for Our Lives, emerging as more influential on Instagram than celebrities on the gun control. One of the tools they used were the hashtags. Top hashtags such as #MarchForOurLives #NeverAgain, #GunControlNow, and #EnoughIsEnough are used to spread the word and call on the public's attention. Instagram becomes an 'informal' narrative platform that promoted a 'clicktivism' type of responses from the audience for the march. Besides, students collaborate with Bartle Bogle Hegarty (BBH) to create the first Instagram coloring book. BBH L.A. executive creative director Zach Hilder said, "we wanted to give them tools to elevate their voices, create a way to unify their message and allow everyone to participate in the march. That's the inspiration for Color for Our Lives."

=== Facebook ===
The March For Our Lives movement employs Facebook as another social media platform to spread awareness of its campaigns and messages to people around the world. As of March 5, 2019, nineteen days before the one year anniversary of the protests, the MFOL Facebook page had garnered more than 300,000 followers. The page is mainly used to provide updates on national policies regarding gun laws, as well as coverage of various politicians who advocate for more gun safety. Similar to other media platforms, the Facebook page frequently employs popular hashtags such as #MarchForOurLives and #NeverAgain in its posts. Although other social media platforms such as Twitter and Instagram often make posts to increase awareness, Facebook is more often used to organize people in nearby marches or demonstrations in major cities, and this has seen great success. For example, Facebook played a role in the March 24, 2018, March For Our Lives and Never Again collaboration gathering in Washington, D.C., where more than 47,000 people marked themselves as "going," and where more than 90,000 people from across the nation and world marked themselves as "interested" on the Facebook events posting.

=== Snapchat ===
The March For Our Lives movement leveraged Snapchat to gain momentum, spread the word and draw attention to what students and supporters were doing around the United States in response to recent shootings on school campuses. Unique from other social media platforms, Snapchat contains a map feature that allowed the world to see when and where activities by its users is taking place. This allowed the student walkouts to be easily tracked around the US. Video shows thousands of students and supporters walking the streets, protesting gun violence and current gun laws. Snapchat created a "March For Our Lives" Sticker that could be used by the platform's users to document the walkouts around the US.

=== Celebrity controversy ===
Jesse Hughes, a survivor of the Bataclan terrorist attack, called the march "pathetic", but after being criticized for his comment, later apologized saying, "I was not attempting to impugn the youth of America and this beautiful thing that they accomplished. I truly am sorry, I did not mean to hurt anyone or cause any harm."

== Locations ==
=== United States ===
Maps
March for Our Lives (demonstration) (the United States)
March for Our Lives (demonstration) (Alaska)
March for Our Lives (demonstration) (Hawaii)
March for Our Lives (demonstration) (Puerto Rico)

==== Washington, D.C. ====
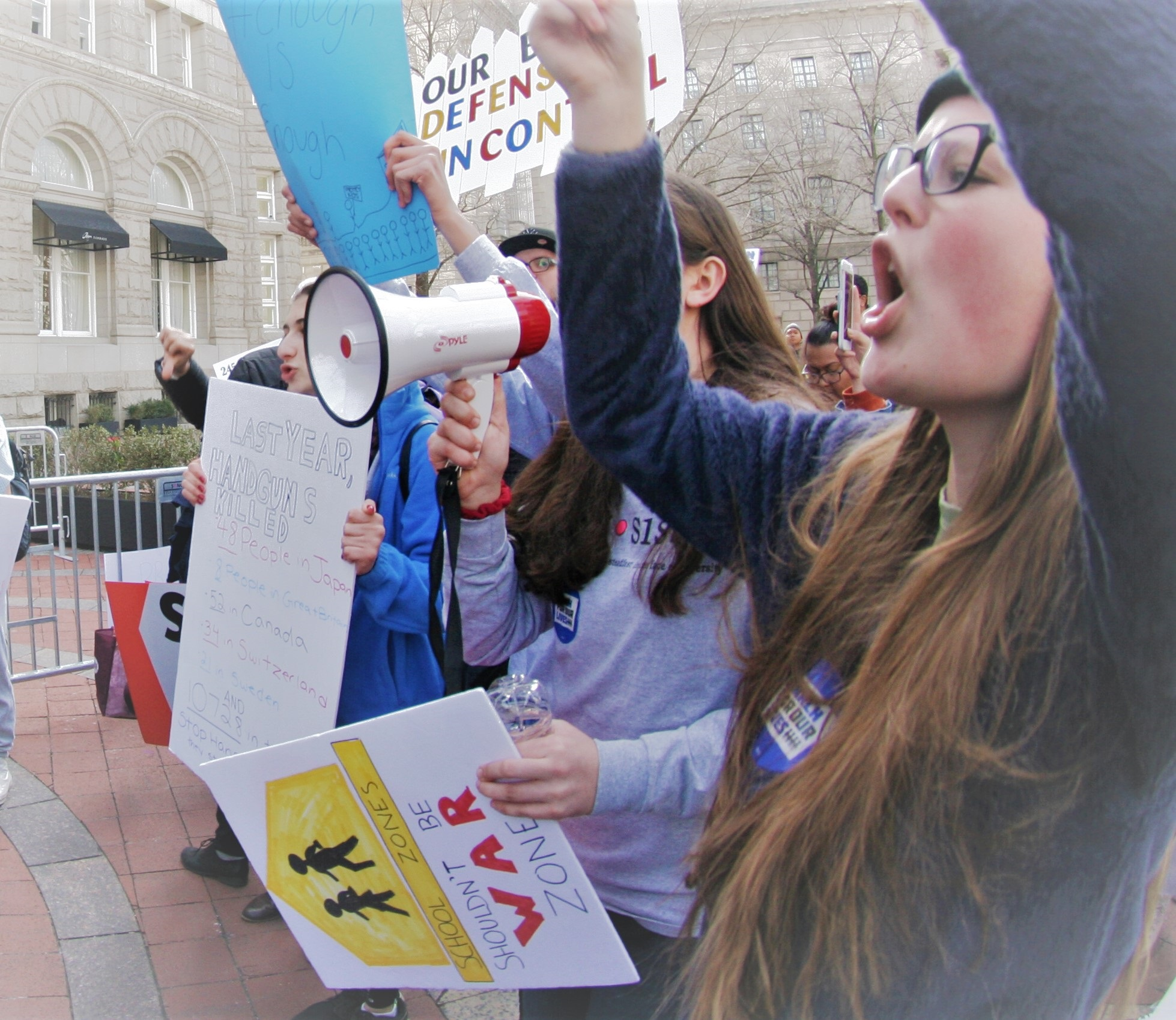
Protesters at Trump Hotel in Washington, D.C.

In anticipation and planning of the day's events, many streets in the nation's capital were closed to vehicle traffic. Several blocks of streets encompassing much of the National Mall, stretching from the Washington Monument to the United States Capitol and from Independence Avenue to E Street, were closed to vehicle traffic. Some of the rally-goers grouped at Trump Hotel, expressing displeasure that the Trump administration has not addressed school safety nor gun control in a meaningful way.

==== Northeast ====
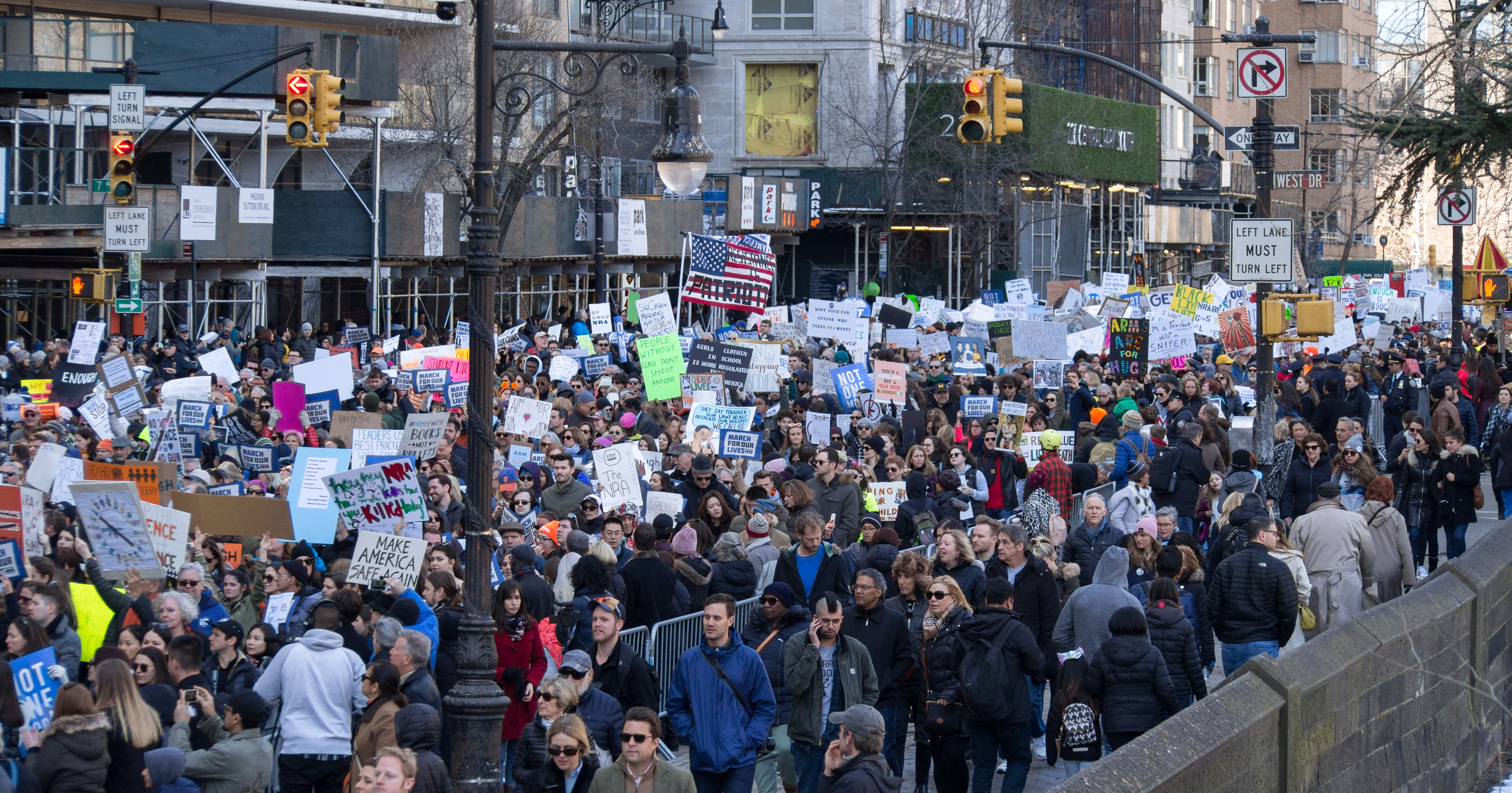
Rally in Central Park South in New York City

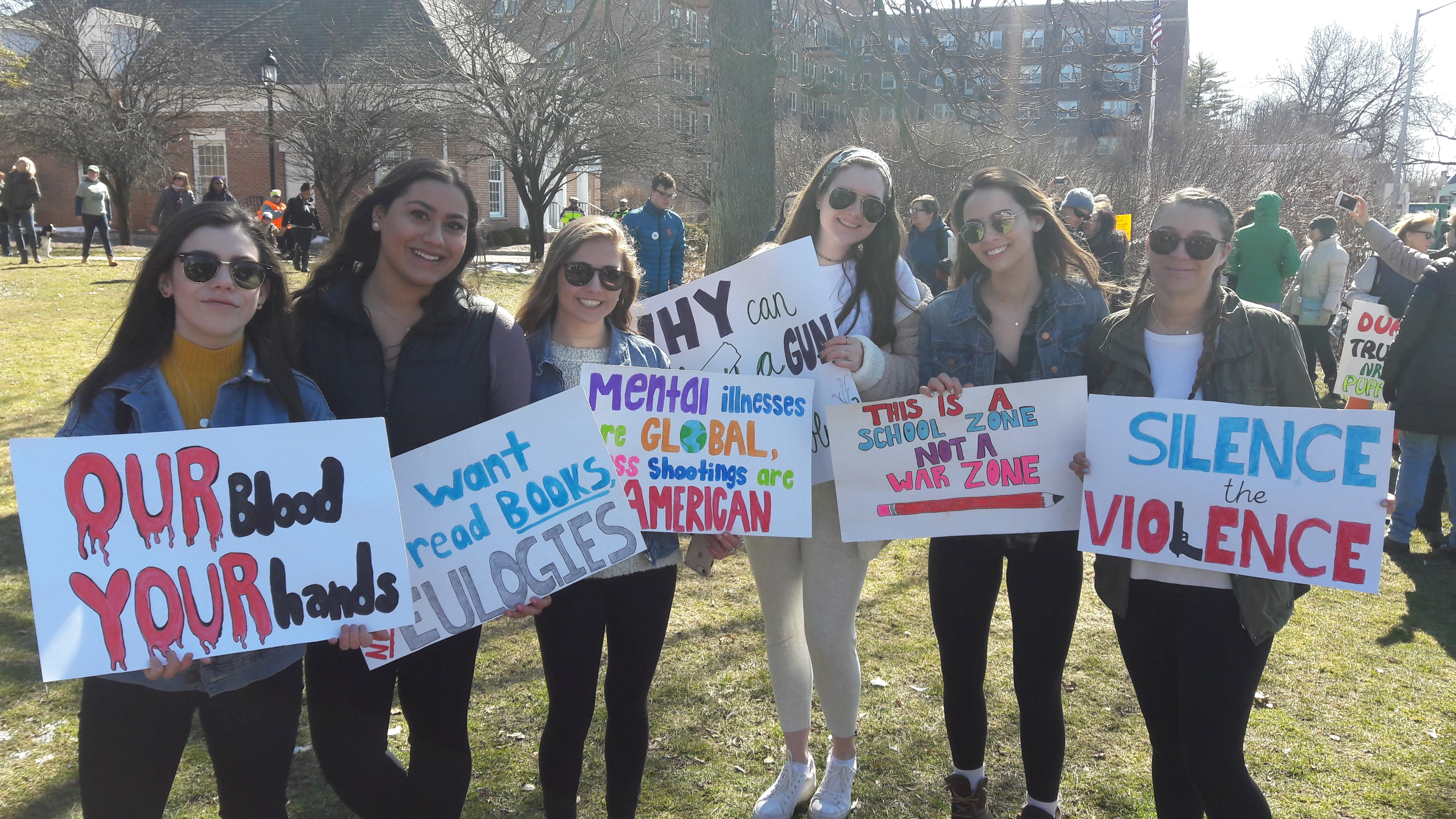
Rally in Morristown, New Jersey

In Connecticut, marches took place in Hartford, East Haddam, Enfield, Guilford, Middlebury, New Haven, Old Saybrook, Pawcatuck, Roxbury, Salisbury, Shelton, Stamford and Westport.

In Maine, demonstrations took place in at least fifteen communities throughout the state, the largest demonstration occurring in the city of Portland, with smaller marches in the cities of Bangor, Orono, Lewiston and Presque Isle.

In Massachusetts, demonstrations were held in Boston (Boston Common), Cape Ann and Martha's Vineyard. WGBH reported that marches took place in Beverly, Hyannis (1,500 participants), Worcester (1,000 participants), Springfield (several hundred), Falmouth (500 participants). Boston Police estimate 80,000 people joined the demonstration.

In New Hampshire, marches took place in Concord and Portsmouth and Jackson. The Concord event was organized by Eve Caplan, a sophomore at John Stark Regional High School, and another high school student in Plymouth, New Hampshire. Portsmouth had a demonstration in Market Square, and was organized Sarah Mae Brown, a leader of The Resistance Seacoast.

In New Jersey, demonstrations took place in Trenton, Newark, Asbury Park, Hackensack, Haddon Heights, Hoboken, Jersey City, Montclair, Morristown, Ocean City, Somerset County, Somerville, Union and Westfield.

In New York, demonstrations were held in Albany, Binghamton, Buffalo, Cobleskill, Ithaca, Oneonta, Rochester (Washington Square Park), and White Plains. In New York City, where an estimated 200,000 people marched, the musician Paul McCartney cited the murder of John Lennon as motivation for joining the protests when he told a CNN journalist, "One of my best friends was killed in gun violence, so it's important to me."

In Pennsylvania, marches took place in Allentown, Bloomsburg, Doylestown, Easton, Erie, Lancaster, Philadelphia, Pittsburgh, Reading, Scranton and State College. Jay Leno made an appearance in West Chester.

A march took place in Providence, Rhode Island. Thousands of people gathered on the lawn of the Rhode Island State House.

In Montpelier, Vermont, city officials estimated that 2,500 people participated in the demonstration on the State House lawn. Elsewhere, demonstrations took place in Bennington, Putney, Rutland, Manchester and Middlebury.

==== Midwest ====
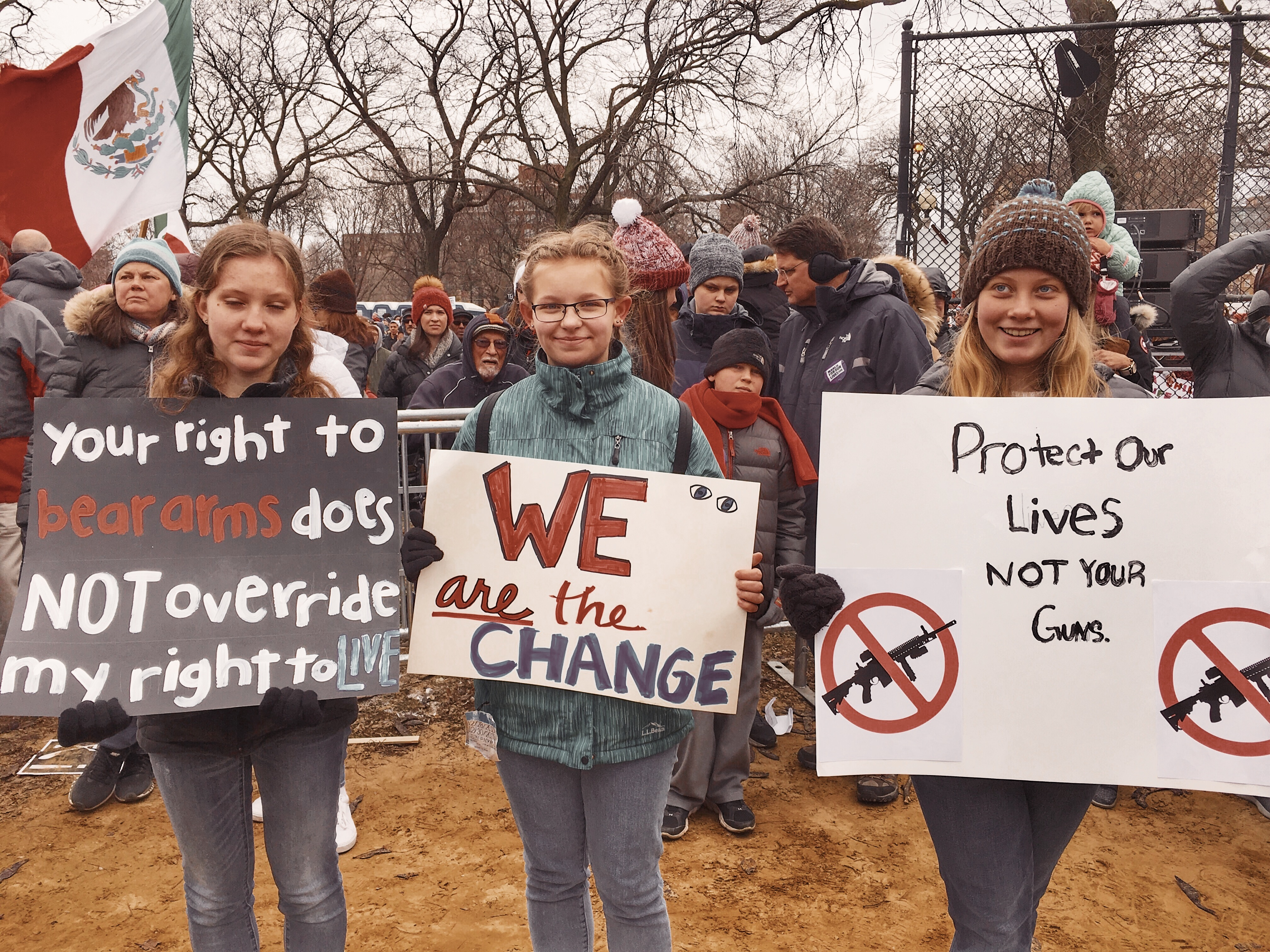
Rally in Chicago, Illinois

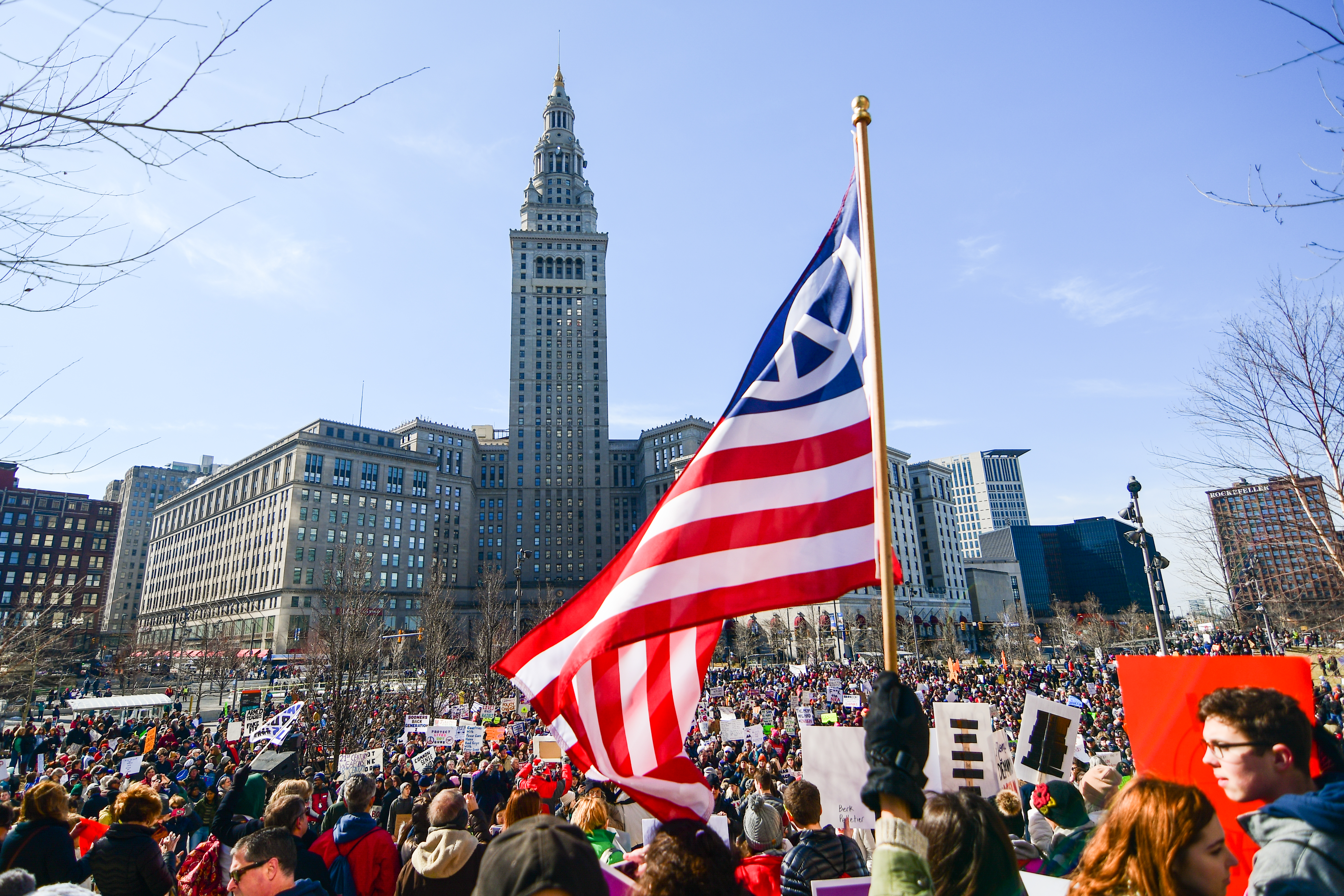
Rally at Public Square in Cleveland, Ohio

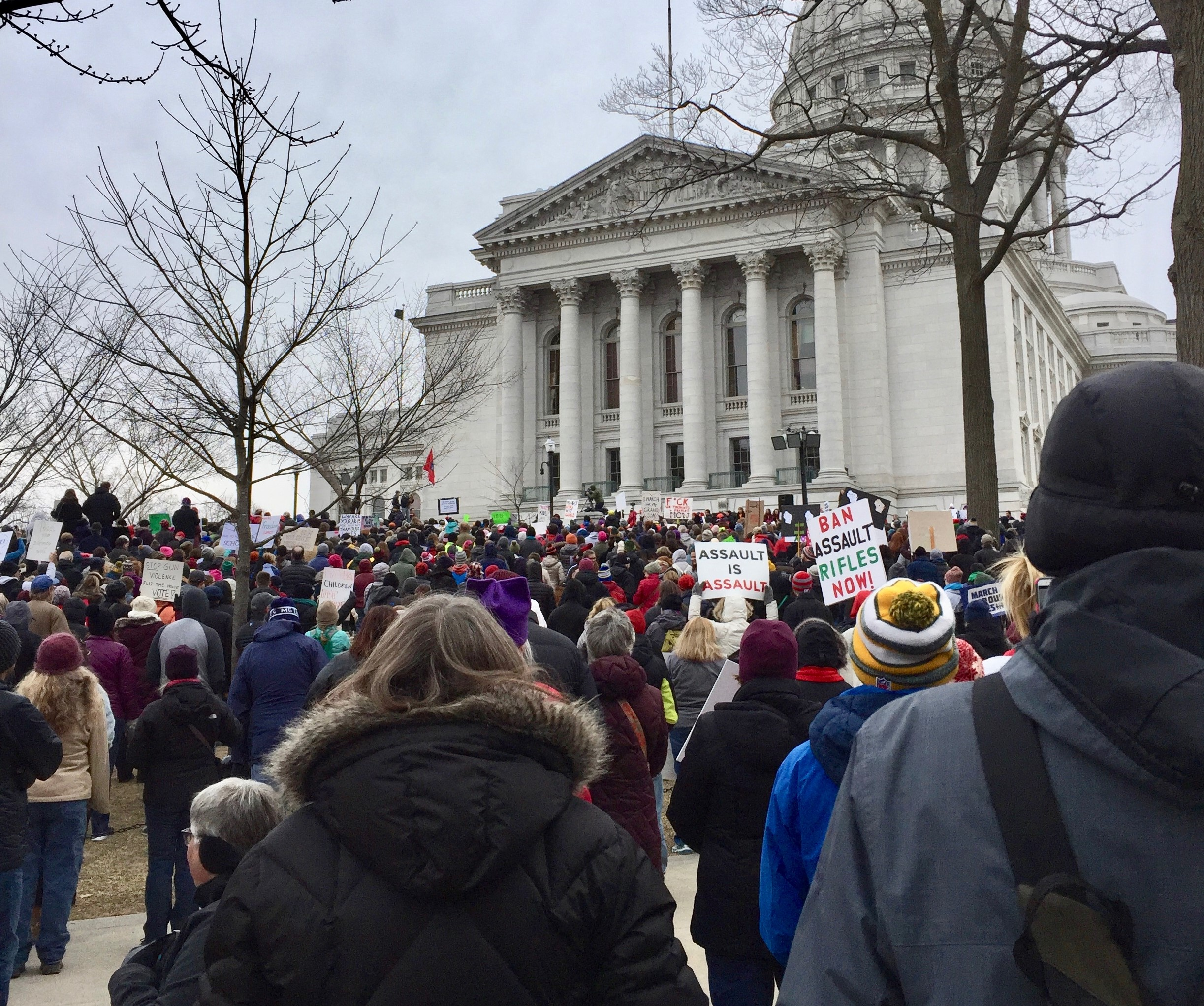
Rally at the capitol building in Madison, Wisconsin

In Illinois, demonstrations were held in Chicago, Glen Ellyn, Springfield, Vernon Hills, and Downers Grove.

In Indiana, a march was planned in Indianapolis.

In Iowa, marches were planned in Des Moines, Iowa City, Davenport, and in Cedar Rapids.

In Michigan, marches occurred in Detroit, Grand Rapids, Lansing, among many statewide.

In Minnesota, 20,000 people attended a march in Saint Paul. Other marches were held in Rochester, Grand Marais, Duluth, Aitkin, Karlstad, Ely, Brainerd, Starbuck, Sartell, North Branch, Willmar, Mankato.

In Missouri, marches took place in Kansas City, O'Fallon, Springfield and St. Louis. The St. Louis march was scheduled to begin at 10:00 am at Union Station and culminate at the Gateway Arch. Initial estimates anticipated 10,000 attendees. The Kansas City rally held at Theis (Volker) Park, just south of the Nelson-Atkins Art Gallery, drew 6,000 participants. The KC March was organized by students from area-wide high schools, who set up a Facebook page chronicling the event. Twenty-one Kansas and Missouri organizations hosted the event. The rally culminated in a march through the nearby Country Club Plaza upscale shopping district. Organizers partnered with the Poor People's Campaign to promote their Faith Assembly at Community Christian Church—planned by Kansas and Missouri organizers together.

In North Dakota, marches took place in Fargo, Bismarck and Minot.

In Ohio there was a rally in Cleveland in Public Square followed by a march through the streets of downtown. In Cincinnati a rally took place at City Hall, which followed a performance with seventeen flutes made from shotgun barrels, as a memorial to the victims of the Parkland shooting. Another march occurred in Columbus at the Ohio Statehouse, and other rallies took place in Athens and Dayton, each drawing hundreds of protesters.

In South Dakota, hundreds attended a march in Sioux Falls. Sister marches were held in Rapid City and Vermillion.

In Wisconsin, marches were planned in Green Bay, La Crosse, Madison, Appleton and Milwaukee.

In Kansas, demonstrations were planned in Wichita, Topeka, Lawrence, and Kansas City's Theis Park. Police estimated 5,000 to 6,000 participants in Kansas City's event.

==== South ====
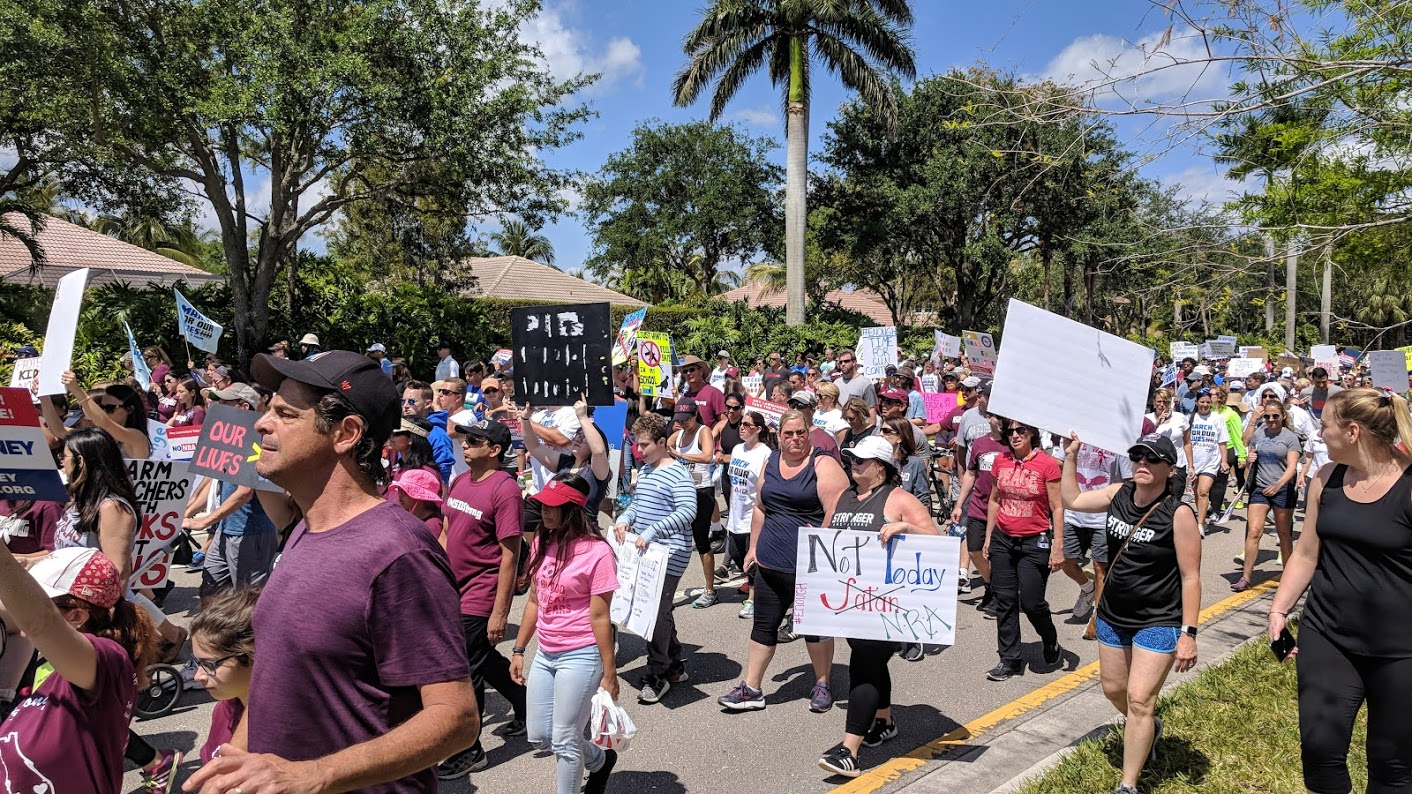
Students and alumni from Marjory Stoneman Douglas High School

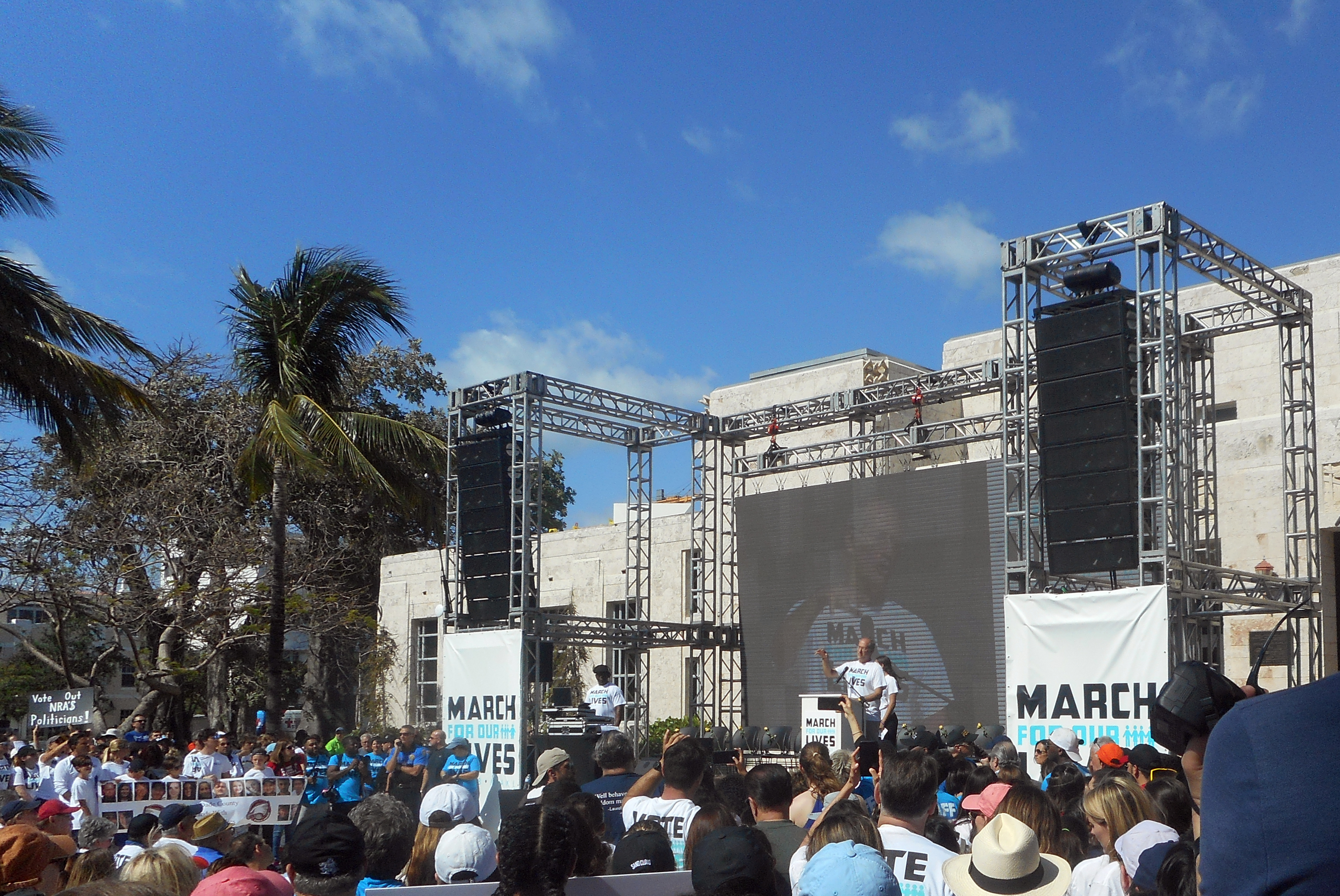
Mayor Dan Gelber speaking at rally at the Bass Museum, Miami Beach

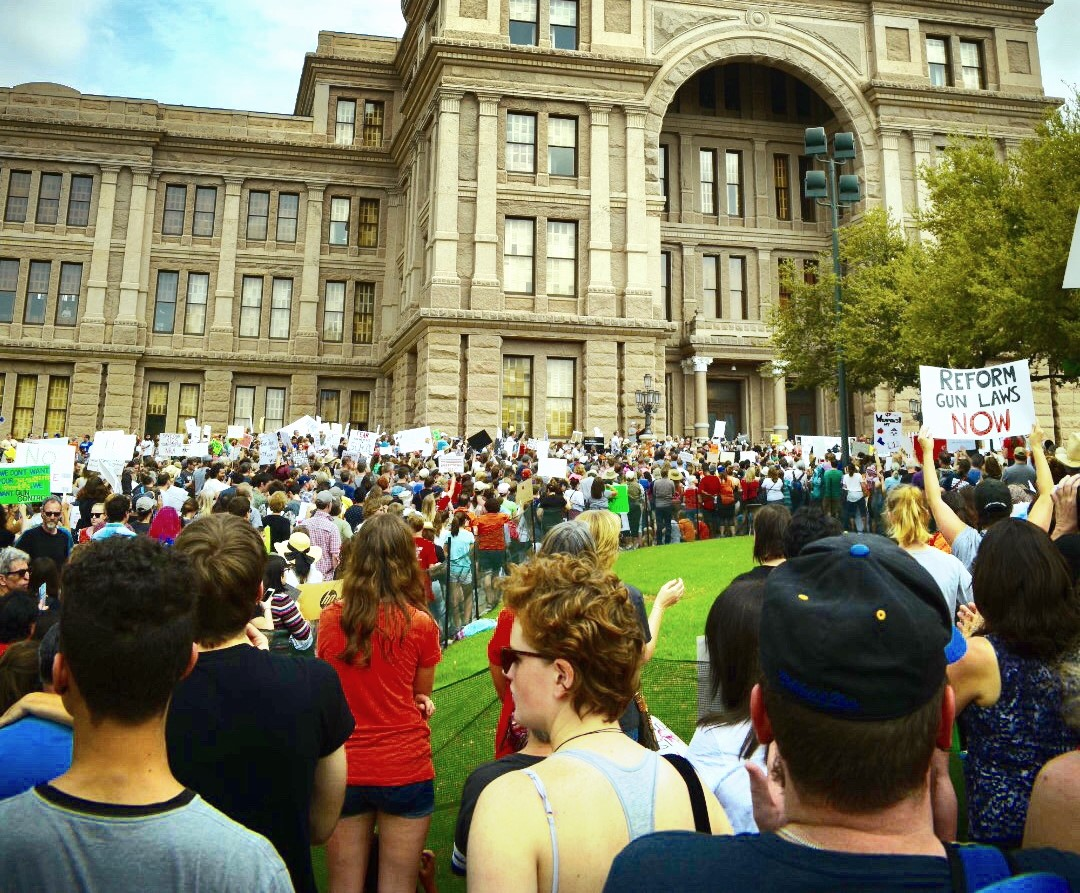
Rally in Austin, Texas

In Alabama, marches took place in Birmingham, Mobile, Dothan, Montgomery, Selma, Jasper, and Florence. The largest of these, the Birmingham march, drew over 5,000 attendees.

In Florida, demonstrations took place in Gulf Breeze, Miami Beach, Orlando and West Palm Beach, Naples where 3,000 people gathered at Cambier Park for the march and a rally. The Orlando march was organized by students of UCF, and was held at Lake Eola Park in downtown Orlando with 35,000 people in attendance. The city where the school shooting occurred, Parkland, also had a march. Similar marches were also held in northeast Florida in Jacksonville, Fernandina Beach, and Saint Augustine.

A rally in Jacksonville had a turnout of over 1,000 people in Hemming Park. Hundreds of people marched from Hemming Park to the Duval County Courthouse with signs including: "Grab them by the mid-terms" and "#neveragain". Notable speakers included John Phillips, the civil attorney of Jordan Davis, the seventeen year old who was shot and killed at a gas station in 2012 and Stranger Things actor Chester Rushing. In Saint Augustine, the march began by walking over the Bridge of Lions, down Avenida Menenedez, ending at Fort Castillo. The event was organized by Flagler college students with assistance from Indivisible St. Johns, St. Johns DEC, Women's March St.Augustine, and Ponte Vedra United Progress.

The Fernandina march saw a turnout of around 1,200, and began north on 6th Street and then down Centre Street. One sign read: "Let's be responsible adults"; another stated: "Organizing, An Active Form of Grieving".

In Georgia, rallies were held at the Georgia State Capitol in Atlanta. Athens, Augusta, and Dahlonega.

In Kentucky, marches were held in Bowling Green, Calvert City, Lexington, Louisville and Marshall County.

In Louisiana, marches were held in Baton Rouge, Lafayette, and New Orleans.

In Maryland, students from Severna Park High School and other Anne Arundel County Public Schools planned a demonstration to be held at Lawyer's Mall in Annapolis. They invited 188 state legislators. Students, teachers, Mayor Gavin Buckley along with Andrew Yang and Moms Demand Action were scheduled to speak. In Baltimore, student members of the Student Activist Association at Baltimore Polytechnic Institute organized a march to begin at War Memorial Plaza in front of City Hall and ending near the Inner Harbor. The Mayor of Baltimore, Catherine Pugh also announced that she was organizing 60 free buses to take students to the demonstrations in Washington, D.C.

In Mississippi, marches were held in Gulfport, Hernando, Jackson, and Oxford.

In North Carolina, marches were held in Asheville, Charlotte, Durham, Raleigh, Hendersonville, and Wilmington.

In Oklahoma, marches were held in Oklahoma City and Tulsa.

In South Carolina, marches were held in downtown Charleston, Greenville, and Columbia.

In Tennessee, demonstrations were held in Chattanooga, Knoxville, Memphis, Cookeville, and Nashville.

In Texas, demonstrations were held in Austin, Corpus Christi, Dallas, El Paso, Fort Worth, Houston, and San Antonio. In Corpus Christi, students from W. B. Ray High School were scheduled to lead a march at 3 p.m. in Sherill Veterans Memorial Park.

In Virginia, Richmond Public Schools planned a march to take place at the Virginia State Capitol at 10 a.m. A march was also scheduled in downtown Norfolk as well as both Portsmouth and Virginia Beach.

==== West ====
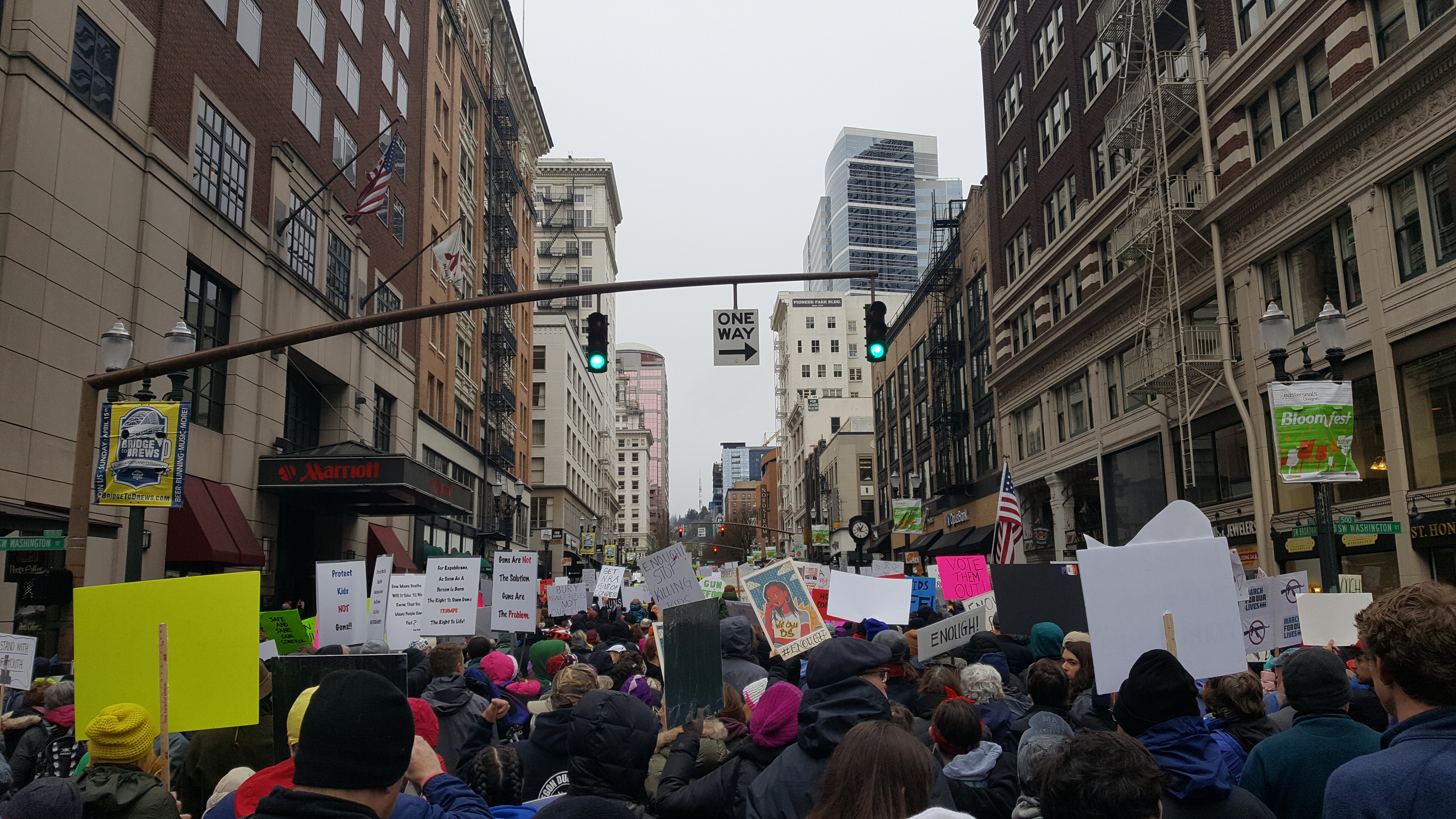
Rally in Portland, Oregon

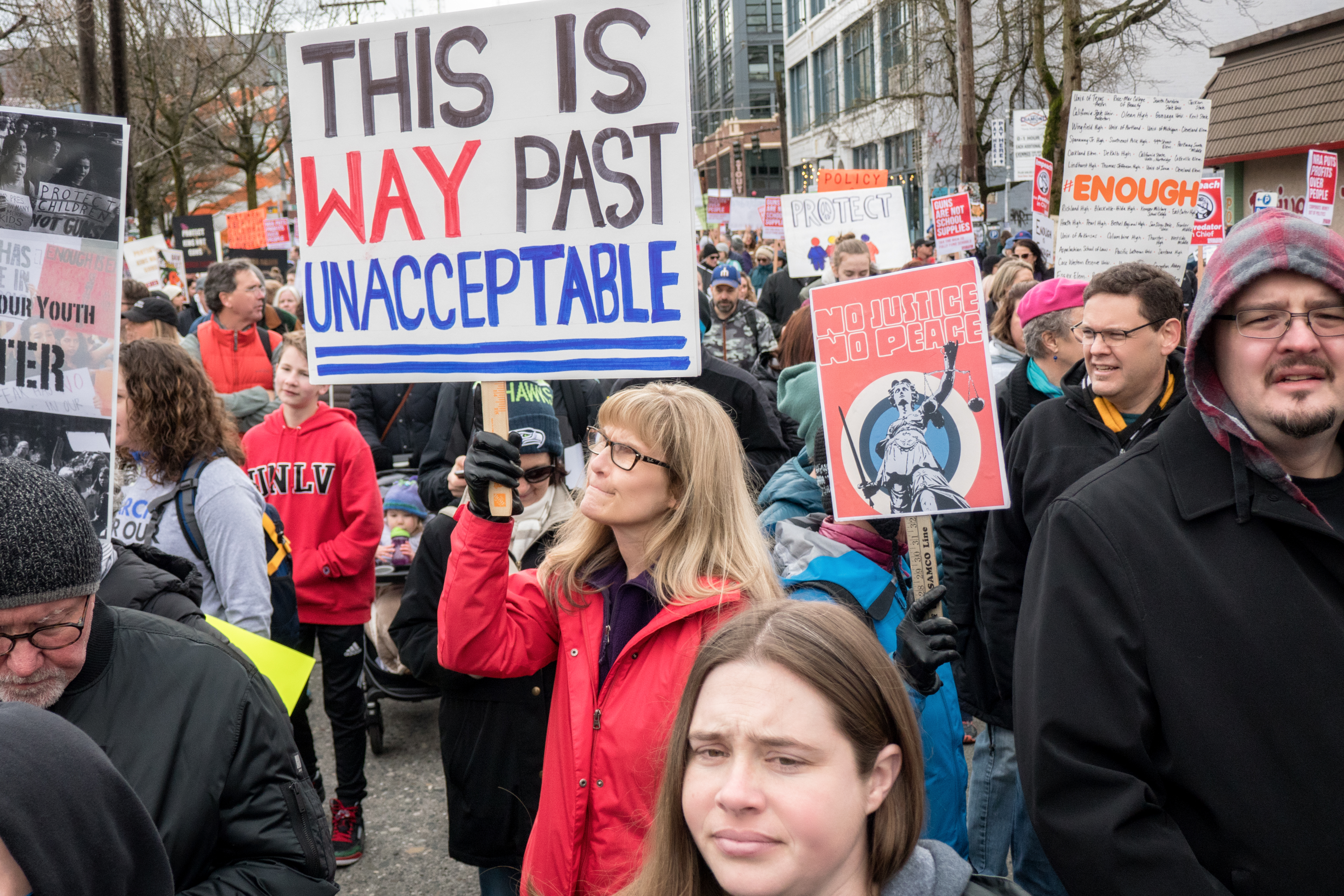
Rally in Seattle, Washington

In Alaska, a march attended by hundreds of people occurred in Anchorage. Marches also took place in Fairbanks, Homer, Juneau and Ketchikan.

In Arizona, marches were held in Phoenix, Prescott, Tucson and Sahuarita.

In California, marches were held in Encinitas, Escondido, Fresno, Los Angeles, Orange County, Sacramento, San Diego, San Luis Obispo, San Jose, Oakland, and San Francisco. The San Francisco march and rally was held in Civic Center Plaza and planned by physician, Shoshana R. Ungerleider.

In Hawaii, demonstrations were held in Honolulu, Kahului, and Waimea.

A march was held in each of the cities of Denver, Colorado; Boise, Idaho; Idaho Falls; and Helena, Montana;

In New Mexico, marches were held in Albuquerque and Santa Fe.

In Oregon, marches happened in Corvallis, Bend, Eugene, Salem, Florence, Coos Bay and Portland. The Portland event included a march from the North Park Blocks to Pioneer Courthouse Square, where Portugal. The Man performed.

In Utah, there were several marches planned including in Logan, Salt Lake City, Park City, Provo, Cedar City and St. George.

In the state of Washington, marches attended by hundreds took place in Spokane, and Yakima. Thousands marched in Seattle and Bellingham.

==== Puerto Rico ====
In an official announcement to the state, Governor Ricardo Rosselló announced that he commissioned the Secretary of State, Luis G. Rivera Marín, to begin preparations for the march in San Juan. Rosselló called for all citizens and civic, religious, and private sector organizations to stand united in solidarity for improved gun control. He also remarked that Puerto Rico has the strictest gun control regulations of all jurisdictions in the country. Rivera Marín stated that "our communities need to be a place where our people have peace, not fear". He announced that the march would begin at Condado Lagoon and culminate at the Peace Pavilion in Luis Muñoz Rivera Park.

At the end of November 2020, Kemuel Delgado established the first March for Our Lives chapter in Puerto Rico.

=== Outside the United States ===
==== North America ====
Map
March for Our Lives (demonstration) (Canada)

Throughout Canada, in the province of British Columbia, marches were planned in Vancouver and Victoria.

Marches were set to take place in Calgary and Edmonton, Alberta.

Students from R.D. Parker Collegiate in Thompson, Manitoba, were planning to march.

In Ontario, marches were planned in Ottawa, Guelph, Kitchener, Stratford, Toronto, and Waterloo.

In Quebec marches were planned in Montreal, Westmount, Quebec City, and Sherbrooke.

New Brunswick was set to have a march in Fredericton.

Newfoundland and Labrador planned a march to take place in St. John's.

==== Africa ====
Marches were planned in Cairo, Egypt, Pretoria, Cape Town and Johannesburg, South Africa, Accra, Ghana; and Mozambique.

==== Asia ====
Map
March for Our Lives (demonstration) (Asia)

Survivors from the Parkland shooting spoke at rallies in Jerusalem and Tel Aviv, Israel. The event in Tel Aviv took place at the country's U.S. Embassy.

Marches were planned for Shanghai and Hong Kong China, Mumbai and New Delhi, Tokyo and Okinawa, Mingora (Malala Yousafzai's hometown), Karachi and Islamabad, Pakistan as well as Kabul, Jakarta, Kuala Lumpur, Abu Dhabi, Dubai, and Manila.

==== Europe ====
Map
March for Our Lives (demonstration) (Europe)

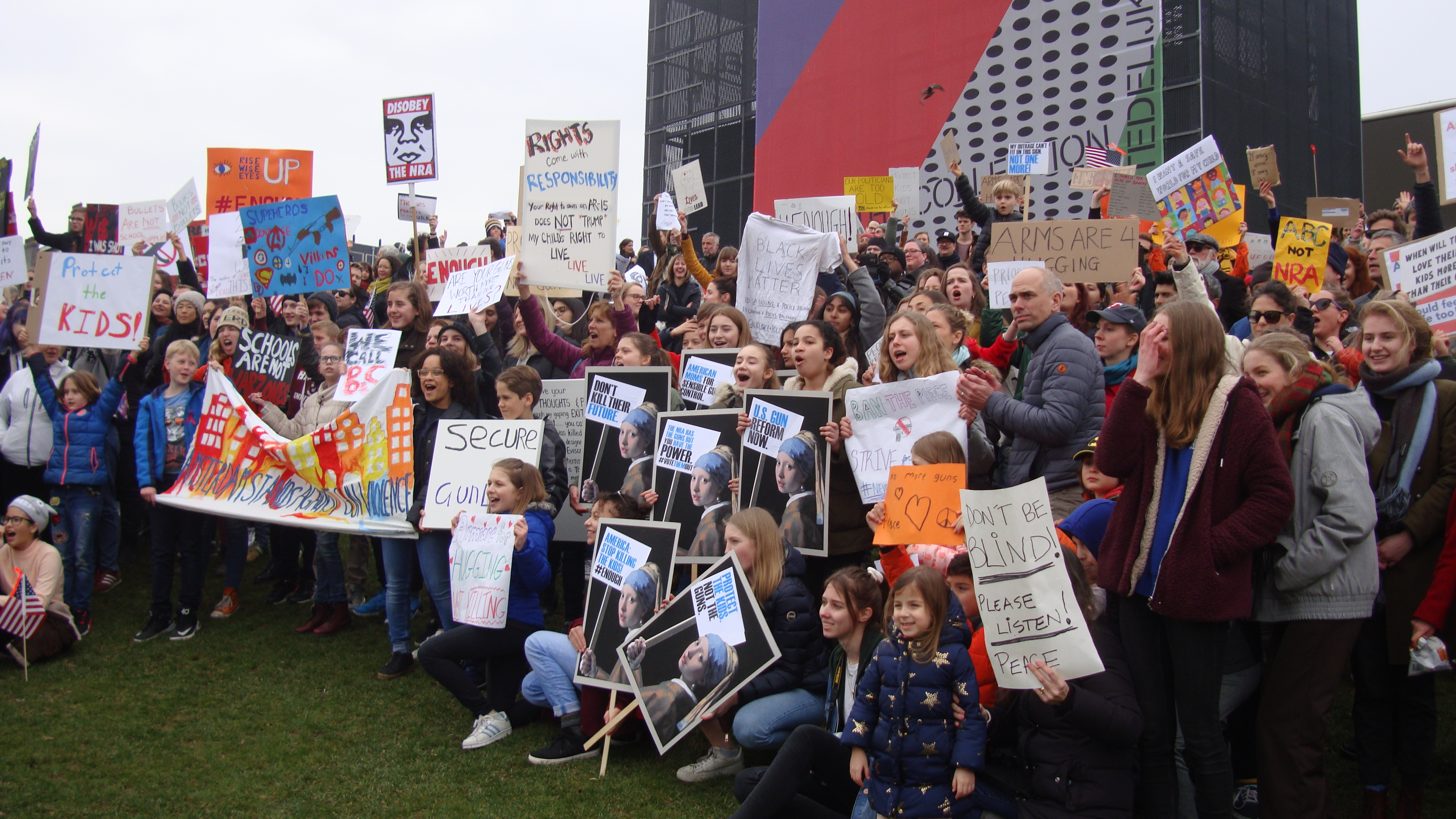
Support for "March For Our Lives" in Museumplein, Amsterdam

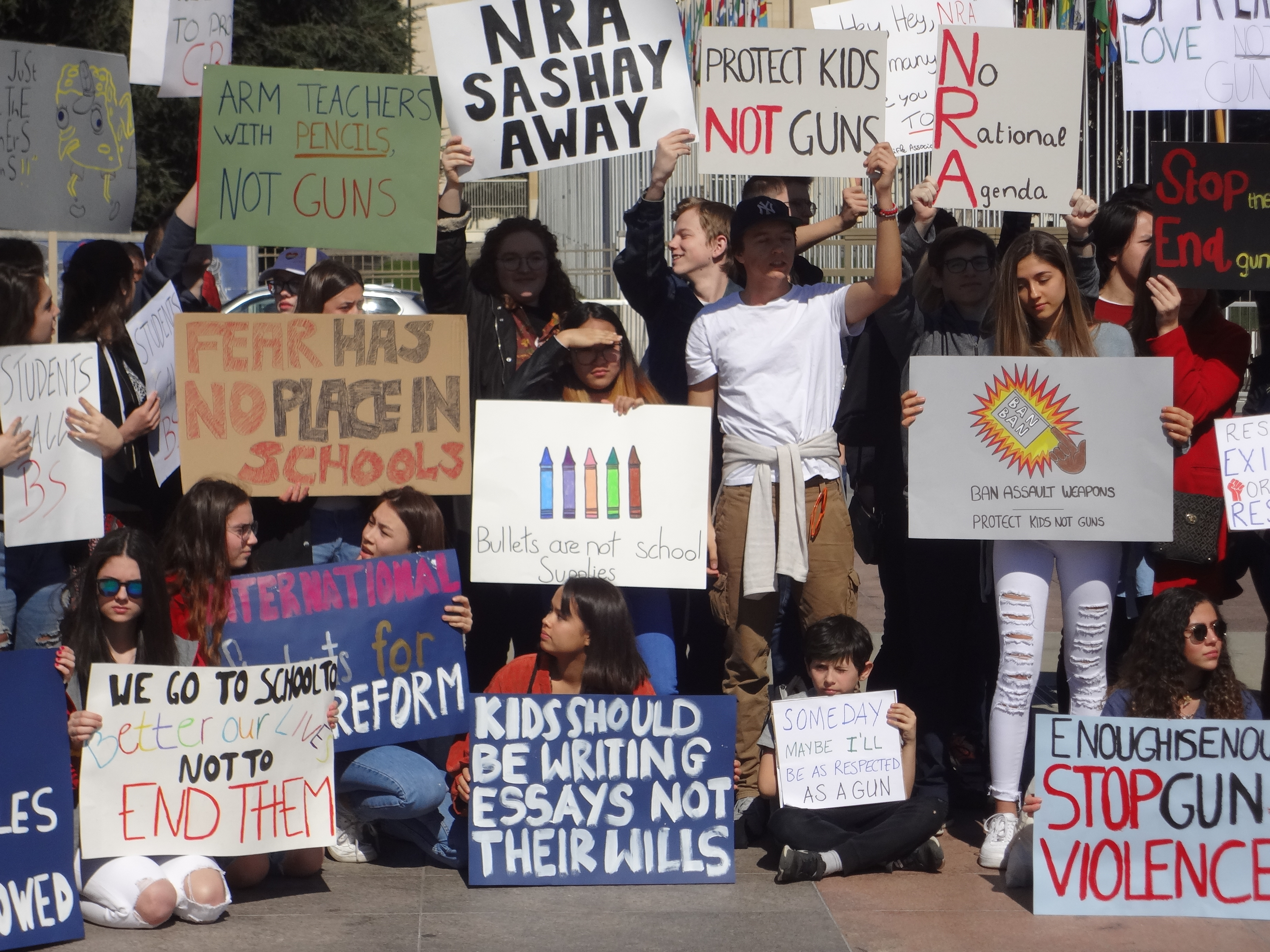
Support for "March For Our Lives" in Geneva, Switzerland

Students from the International School of Geneva in Switzerland organized a rally outside the European headquarters of the United Nations, attracting hundreds of students.

In Germany, protests were held in Berlin, Hamburg, Frankfurt, Friedrichshafen, Heidelberg, Munich, and Wiesbaden. Events also took place in Reykjavík, Barcelona, Oslo, Stockholm, and Geneva.

In the United Kingdom, hundreds marched outside the US embassy in London. Marchers also held a "die in" and lay on the ground outside the US embassy to show solidarity with the Parkland students. Demonstrations also took place in Belfast and London. In Scotland, relatives of the Dunblane massacre victims joined a demonstration outside the US consulate in Edinburgh.

International and American students rallied in Rome near the US embassy, some holding signs that read "Protect People, Not Guns", "Enough is Enough", and "Dress Codes Are More Regulated Than Guns", as they wanted to make their voice clear to America. The march in Rome was organized by the Rome chapter of American Expats for Positive Change (AEPC); the organizers stated their efforts to support America and safety in US schools, even though gun violence was not solely an American issue.

In Amsterdam, hundreds participated in a demonstration near the US consulate on the Museumplein. The organizers and speakers included American and Dutch high school students, an alumna of Marjory Stoneman Douglas High School, and a Florida student walkout organizer who lost a friend in the Parkland shooting.

Protests were also held in Vienna, Paris, The Hague, Helsinki, Budapest, Bucharest, Sofia, Riga, Málaga, Lisbon, Warsaw, Minsk, Majorca, Copenhagen, and Brussels.

==== Oceania ====
Map
March for Our Lives (demonstration) (Oceania)

Marches were planned for Melbourne, Brisbane, Canberra, and Sydney, Australia.

New Zealand planned marches in Albert Park, Auckland; Parliament House, Wellington; Cathedral Square, Christchurch; and Union Hall at the University of Otago, Dunedin.

==== South America ====
In Argentina, a march was planned in Buenos Aires.

In Brazil, two marches was planned in Rio de Janeiro and São Paulo.

Other protests took place in Lima, Peru, Bogotá, Colombia, Georgetown, Guyana and Caracas, Venezuela, the city where Parkland victim Joaquin Oliver and his family escaped from and immigrated to the U.S. to live a better life because of the city's violence and poverty. They officially became American citizens last year at the time in November 2017.

== Gallery ==
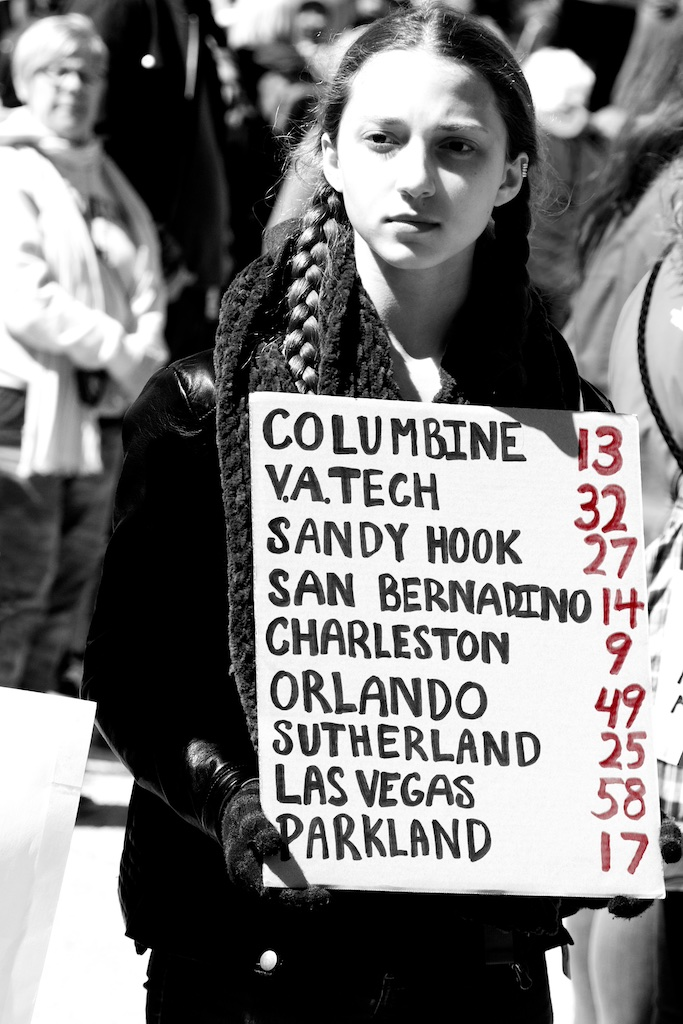
Washington, D.C.

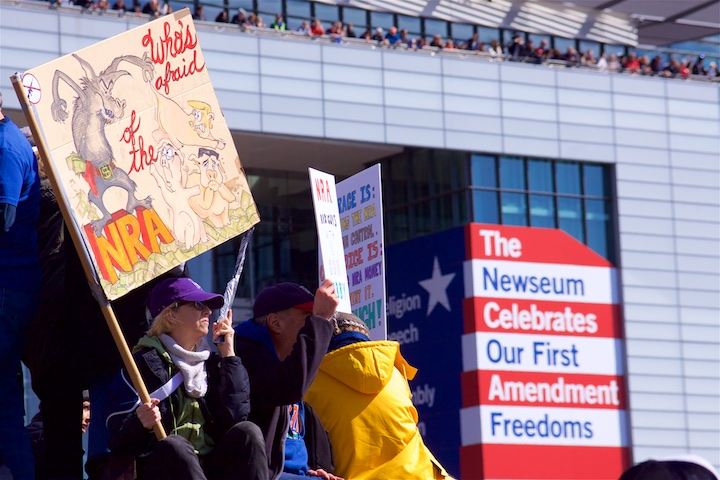
Washington, D.C.

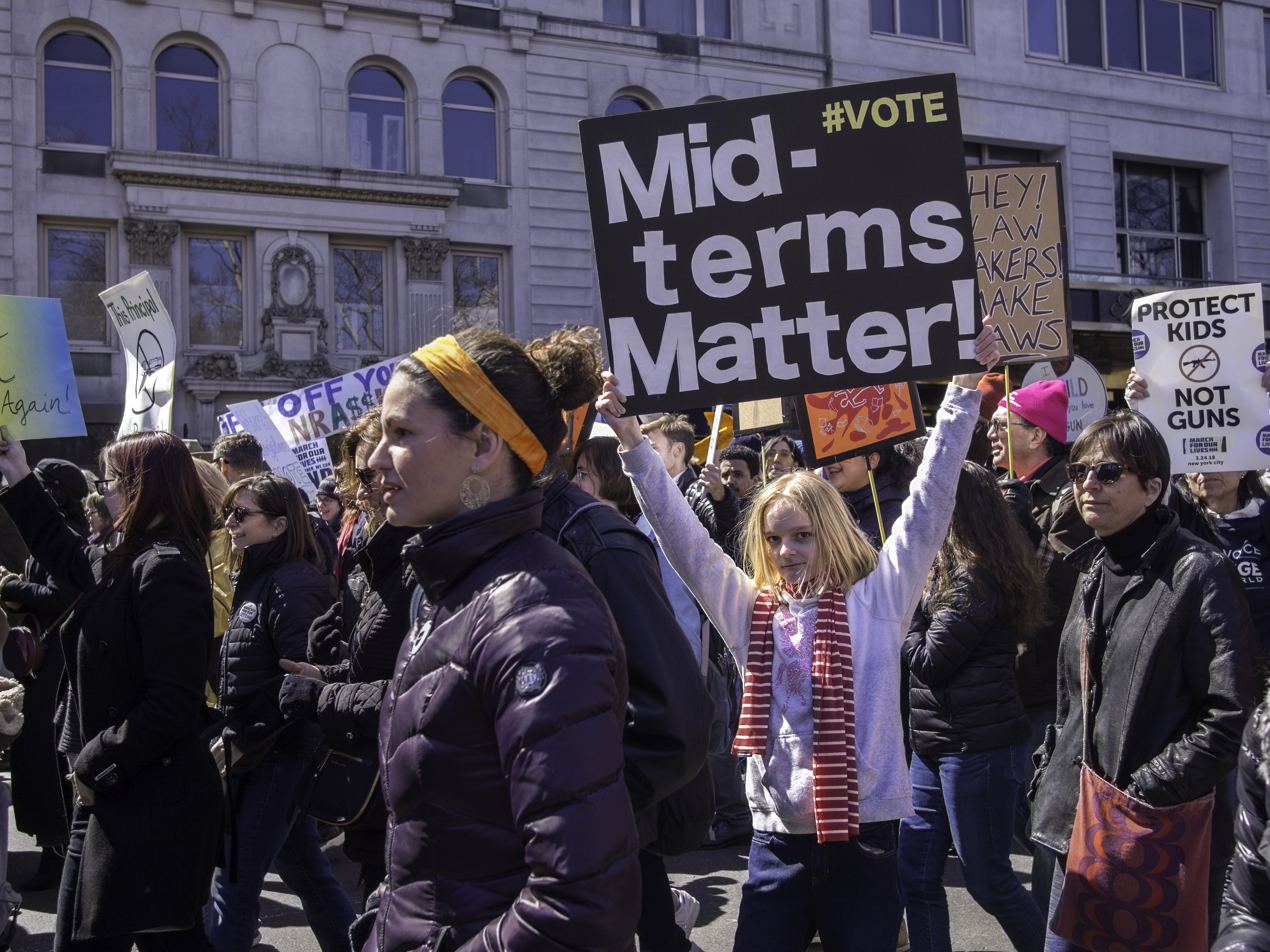
New York City

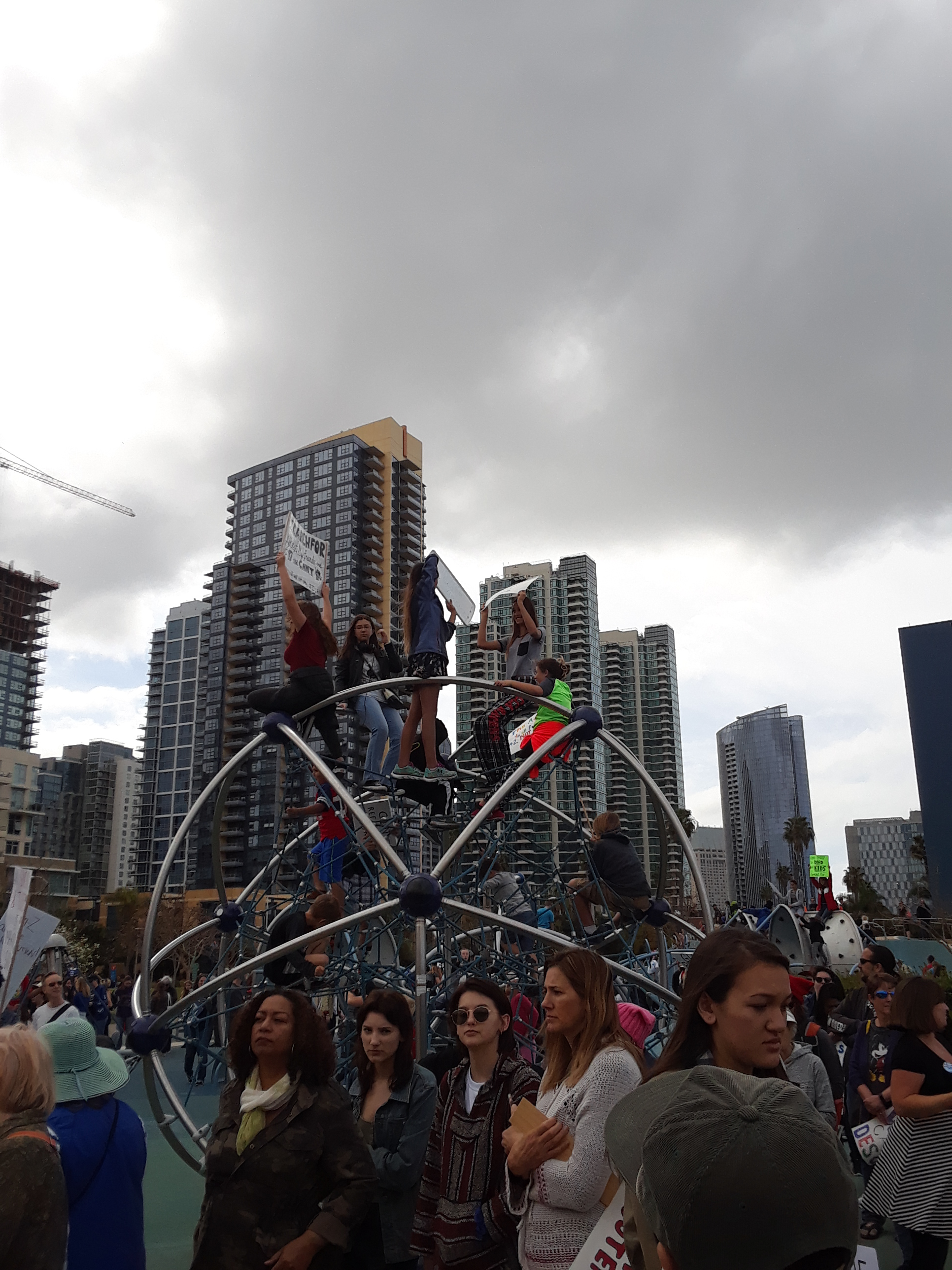
San Diego

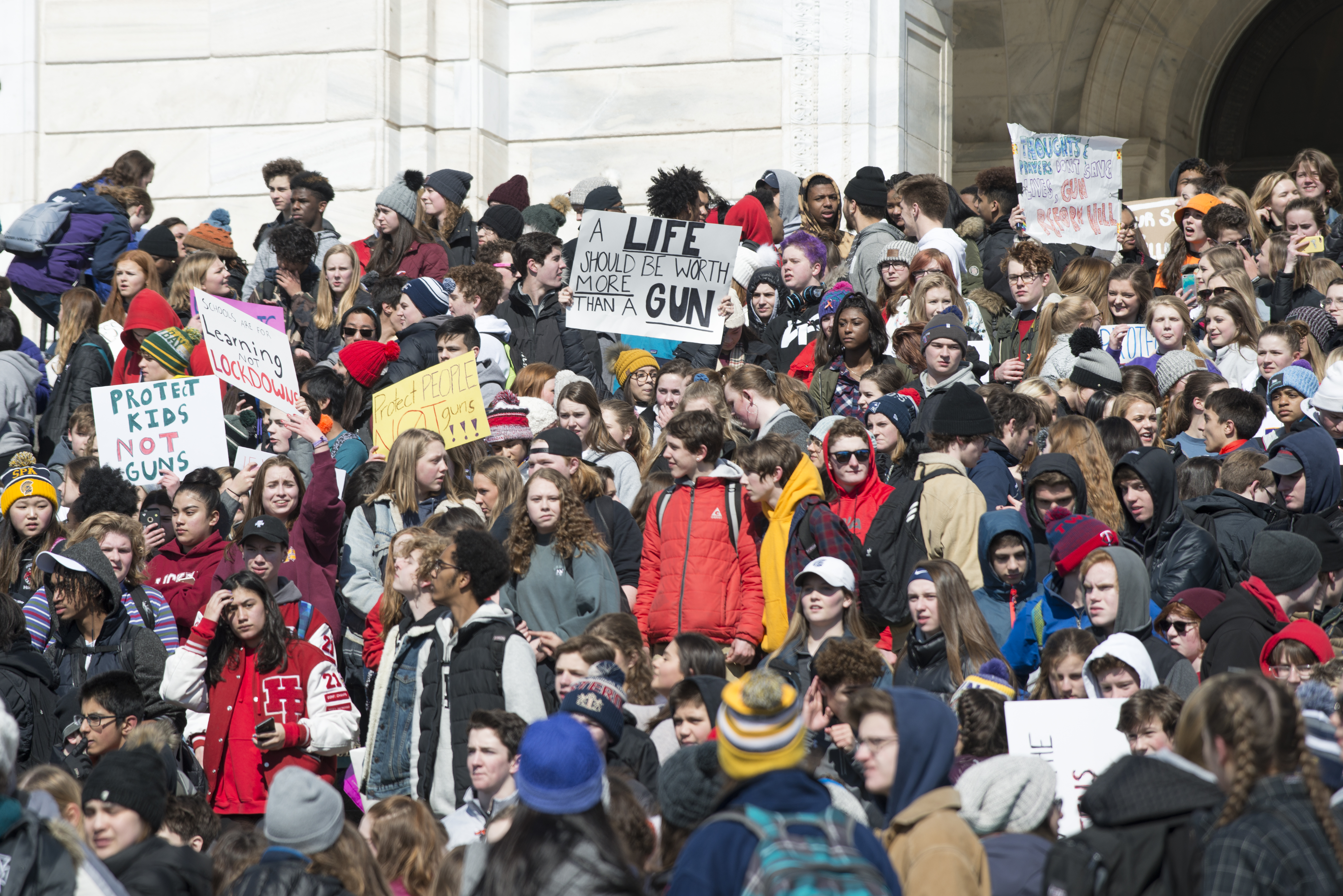
Students protest for gun control; the U.S.

== See also ==
- 2018 United States gun violence protests
- 2018 United States elections
- A Peace Plan for a Safer America
- Mass shootings in the United States
- Million Mom March
- List of school shootings in the United States (before 2000)
- List of school shootings in the United States (2000–present)
- Stoneman Douglas High School shooting
- Gun culture in the United States
- Gun politics in the United States
- Gun violence in the United States
- Fahrenheit 11/9 (2018 film)
- Assault weapons legislation in the United States
- List of rallies and protest marches in Washington, D.C.
- Student protest
- School strike for climate
