= The European Youth Congress series =

The European Youth Congress (EYC) is a series of bi-annual gatherings of around 100 young people from European countries, who meet to discuss current global social issues. It is operated by Peace Child International (PCI), a UK-based charity. Its aim is to encourage young people from European countries to take an active role in 'making a difference' to the world that they live in. The main focus of the Congress changes from year to year, and subjects of conversation have included: Climate change, Environmental issues, the World economy, and young people with fewer opportunities (YPFOs).

== Congresses ==
Information on congresses has been taken from the website of Peace Child International.

=== The First EYC - St Donat's Castle, Wales, UK (August 2004) ===
The first congress, hosted in the attractive surroundings of the UK's United World College, Atlantic College, was a conscious Prepcom for the 3rd World Youth Congress in Scotland. Co-hosted by the Scottish Youth Parliament, all the workshop sessions focused on issues of volunteerism, social responsibility and international development to be discussed at the Scottish World Youth Congress. This EYC was perhaps most memorable for the moment when the bus carrying delegates to Scotland broke down causing everyone to stay overnight in Birmingham before traveling on to Stirling Scotland, where they took part in the Ministerial Announcement of the Congress.

=== The Second EYC - Mürzzuschlag, Austria (August 2007) ===
"It's Your Turn" was a 6-day event destined at European youth leaders and aimed at exploring good practice in youth-led community improvement project management. A mentored process, hosted in distinctive locations around the town (a ski museum, an 18th-century coffee bar, a railway carriage museum etc.) trained them in needs assessment and prioritisation, project design, scheduling, budgeting, permissions, resource and volunteer mobilisation, project implementation, evaluation and reporting. The meeting also had an excellent cultural programme and a fun opening day in the Mürzzuschlag ropes park – where the team developed trust in each other. There was also a session discussing the EU-Africa Strategy with young Africans, and a World Café discussing issues to be raised at the 2008 World Youth Congress in Quebec City, Canada. On the final day, the congress delegates were bussed to Vienna, where some of their project ideas were presented to, and discussed by a panel of experts at the UN Office in Vienna. The Congress closed with a day in the Austrian Alps – visiting the historic and natural sites of special interest. A book on Youth-led Development was reviewed and analysed by delegates, and published by the Schumacher Society after the end of the congress. The partners, Peace Child International, and United Games Austria also produced a handbook, It's Your Turn, listing all the projects developed by delegates during the Congress.

=== The Third EYC - Izola, Slovenia (August 2009) ===
The third EYC is a response to the growing young people's apathy in Europe. Besides trying to teach the right approach to criticism, the Congress enlightened an area considered as a taboo topic – the inclusion of young people with fewer opportunities (YPFO) in decision-making processes. As the YPFOs are considered to be all young people that have had difficulties to integrate in the society due to their background (mental or physical disability, ethnic or difficult family background, socio-economical status, sex orientation, criminal past, being an early school dropper, living in a remote area etc.), the event raised awareness about this specific group of young people that amount to 73 million in the European Union. The Conference was co-organized by No Excuse and United Games of Nations Slovenia.
