= Matt Post =

American lawyer, activist, and politician

- Post in 2018

Member-elect of the Maryland House of Delegates from the 14th district
- Assuming office January 13, 2027
- Succeeding: Pamela E. Queen

Student Member of the Montgomery County Board of Education
- In office July 7, 2017 – June 30, 2018
- Preceded by: Eric Guerci
- Succeeded by: Ananya Tadikonda

Personal details
- Born: August 29, 1999 (age 27)
- Party: Democratic
- Education: Sherwood High School; Yale University (BA, JD)
- Occupation: Labor attorney, activist

Matthew Post (born August 29, 1999) is an American lawyer, student activist, and politician who is a member-elect of the Maryland House of Delegates from the 14th district. A member of the Democratic Party, he was a student member of the Montgomery County Board of Education from 2017 to 2018. Post was also a national organizer in the March for Our Lives movement.

== Early life and education ==
Post was born on August 29, 1999. He grew up in Montgomery County, Maryland.

Post first got involved with student government in fifth grade, when he became his school's class president. In eighth grade, he joined the Montgomery County Regional Student Government Association, becoming vice president in 2016. In 2015, Post he served as chief of staff to student board member Eric Guerci.

In 2017, he ran for a seat on the student board to succeed Guerci on a platform of allowing open lunches at schools, removing internet blocks on social media apps, and adding mental illness awareness to curriculum. When he was elected, he became the first student member from Sherwood High School. His term shortly after he graduated from Sherwood High School in 2018.

Post next attended Yale University, where he graduated in 2022 with a degree in public policy. He later qualified as a lawyer.

== Activism ==
Post speaking at the National Walkout Day rally in Washington, D.C., with then-Senate Minority Leader Chuck Schumer, March 2018

In March 2018, he participated in the March for Our Lives demonstration in Washington, D.C., where he was one of several student speakers. Following the rally, Post introduced a resolution passed by the Montgomery County school board urging lawmakers to pass legislation to reduce gun violence.

He remained a judicial advocacy associate and a field strategist for March for Our Lives while attending Yale, and spoke on campus about the need for gun reform.

In May 2018, Post and other student gun control activists, including Aalayah Eastmond, Ramon Contreras, and Kaleab Jego, formed Team Enough, a youth-led gun violence prevention organization which is part of the Brady Campaign.

In September 2018, Post participated in a silent sit-in protest at Yale Law School against the Brett Kavanaugh Supreme Court nomination, which sought to bring attention to the sexual assault allegations made against him.

He also launched a student food assistance organization called the Ready for School Initiative.

In April 2021, Post was one of nearly 200 students to sign onto an amicus brief in the U.S. Supreme Court case Mahanoy Area School District v. B.L. in support of Brandi Levy, which argued that the court's decision in the case could have significant implications of students' right to free speech.

== Career ==
Post initially worked as a lawyer for the Maryland State Education Association.

=== Maryland House of Delegates ===
In December 2022, Post applied to fill a vacancy left by state delegate Eric Luedtke, who resigned after being named Governor-elect Wes Moore's chief legislative officer. The Montgomery County Democratic Central Committee voted to nominate Bernice Mireku-North to the seat in January 2023, with Post receiving four votes in the second round of voting.

In September 2025, he announced that he would run for a seat in the Maryland House of Delegates for District 14, seeking to succeed retiring state delegate Pamela E. Queen. During the Democratic primary, he ran on a slate with the other District 14 incumbents and was endorsed Maryland governor Wes Moore. Post won the Democratic primary on June 23, 2026, placing second with 29.1 percent of the vote, and ran unopposed in the general election. As of July 2026, Post said he planned to campaign for Democrats in competitive districts.

Post will be sworn in on January 13, 2027, and will be a member of the Economic Matters Committee.
