= Espen Berg (humanitarian) =

Norwegian humanitarian

CEO and Founder of United Youth Development Organization

Personal details
- Born: July 6, 1981 (age 44) Bergen, Norway

Espen Berg (born 6 July 1981) is a Norwegian humanitarian. Espen is the founder and CEO of the United Youth Development Organization. Espen completed a BA (Hons) in International Business at Bournemouth University and an Msc in Development Management at the London School of Economics. Espen is quickly becoming an authority on issues such as youth in development, youth focused microfinance, and youth empowerment, and is a frequent speaker at events and conferences across the UK.

== UYDO ==
In 2008, Espen founded the United Youth Development Organization, a charity that focuses on utilizing the skills and talents of young people globally to raise funds and capacity to invest in micro loans to disadvantaged youth entrepreneurs. In 2010 UYDO was discontinued due to funding challenges.

== Espen's view on youth and microfinance ==
Espen argues that it is a market failure that young people have more difficulties in accessing microfinance services than their ‘adult’ counterparts. He argues that young people are just as capable of maintaining and successfully repaying a loan as adults. Furthermore, he argues that the development return of investing in young people is very high, and that young people have important characteristics and attributes that can add value to the development process. He argues that as a consequence, the development community needs to ensure that young people and their needs are being included in any development programs in order to alleviate the market failure and thus optimize the positive impact that young people can have on economic and social development.
