= Aalayah Eastmond =

Trinidadian-American activist

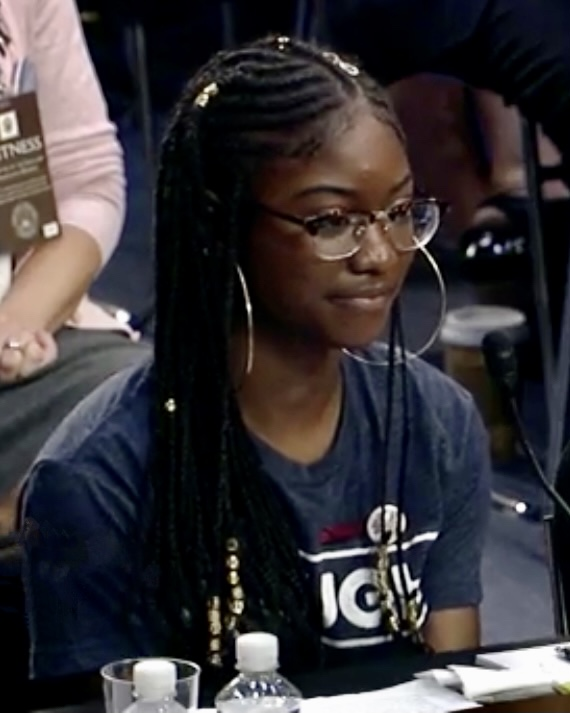
- Eastmond in 2018
- Born: March 22, 2001 (age 25); Brooklyn, New York, U.S.
- Education: Marjory Stoneman Douglas High School; Trinity Washington University
- Occupation: Activist

Aalayah Eastmond (born March 22, 2001) is a Trinidadian-American activist and advocate for gun violence prevention, social justice, and racial equality. After surviving the Stoneman Douglas High School shooting, Eastmond began her activism during the 2018 United States gun violence protests. She has testified multiple times to the U.S. Congress. Eastmond is a founder of Team Enough, a youth-led gun violence prevention organization which is part of the Brady Campaign.

Eastmond also co-founded Concerned Citizens of DC, in the wake of the murder of George Floyd, to organize protests supporting social justice issues in Washington, D.C. She supports Black Lives Matter and protests against police brutality.

== Early life and education ==
Eastmond was born in Brownsville, Brooklyn on March 22, 2001, to Stacey-Ann Llewellyn. When Eastmond was 2 years old, her 18-year-old uncle, Patrick Edwards, was shot and killed leaving his mother's home in Brooklyn. At the age of 4, Eastmond moved with her mother to West Virginia. She played the violin as a child.

Whe she was 8 years old, the two moved to Broward County, Florida.

Eastmond attended Marjory Stoneman Douglas High School. On February 14, 2018, during her junior year, she survived the Stoneman Douglas High School shooting by hiding underneath the body of Nicholas Dworet, a deceased classmate. In the summer following her high school graduation, she lived with her aunt in Brownsville, Brooklyn while interning for Governor Andrew Cuomo.

Eastmond studies criminal justice at Trinity Washington University in the capital.

== Activism ==
Eastmond became prominent during the 2018 United States gun violence protests as a student survivor of the Stoneman Douglas High School shooting, helping lead several high-profile protests, marches, and boycotts. She is an activist and advocate for gun violence prevention, social justice, and racial equality. Eastmond and others from her high school faced criticism for speaking out after the shooting. She attended March for Our Lives events. In July 2018, Eastmond spoke at a gun violence awareness march organized by Save Our Streets Brooklyn. Eastmond testified during the Brett Kavanaugh Supreme Court nomination.

Eastmond is an executive council member of Team Enough, a youth-led gun violence prevention organization which is part of the Brady Campaign. In this role, she provides insights on the impact of gun violence in black and brown communities. Eastmond testified to the United States House and Senate Committee on the Judiciary in support of the Bipartisan Background Checks Act of 2019.

Eastmond is a supporter of Black Lives Matter and protests against police brutality. After the murder of George Floyd, she co-founded Concerned Citizens of DC. The group organizes protests supporting social justice issues in Washington, D.C. At the 2020 March on Washington for racial equity, Eastmond spoke about the connections between racial justice and gun violence.

== Personal life ==
Eastmond suffered from post-traumatic stress disorder (PTSD) after the Parkland shooting. In 2021, after the chaos of the January 6 insurrection, she found herself reacting to the numerous U.S. National Guard troops armed with M-4 rifles (the military counterpart to the Parkland attacker's weapon), assigned to the city as part of heightened security preparations for the inauguration of Joe Biden as President.
