= A Peace Plan for a Safer America =

Gun control plan

"A Peace Plan for a Safer America" is a gun control plan proposed by March for Our Lives. The plan was unveiled in August 2019.

== Plan ==
The plan has six points. More than 40 people worked on the plan, collaborating online, over phone, and at a meeting in Houston in July 2019.

== Endorsements ==
Beto O'Rourke was the first 2020 presidential candidate to endorse the plan.
