= UYDO =

British youth development organization

United Youth Development Organization
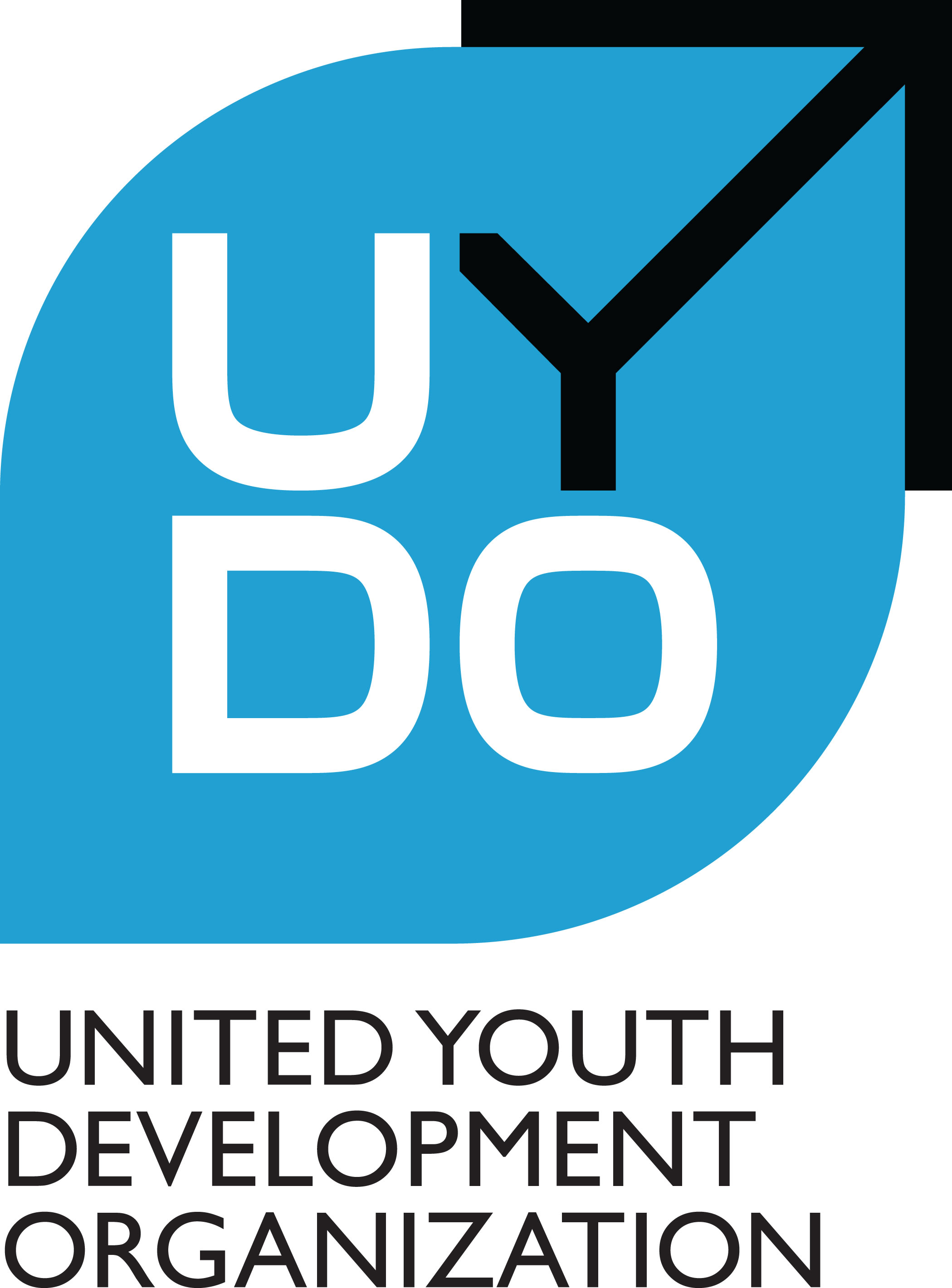
- Abbreviation: UYDO
- Founded: 2008
- Dissolved: 2010
- Type: Nonprofit
- Location: London, UK
- Method: Microfinance
- Fields: International Development
- Website: www.uydo.org

UYDO (United Youth Development Organization) was a British youth-led charity which focuses on empowering young people in the developing world to take themselves out of unemployment and poverty through entrepreneurship.

== History ==
UYDO was founded by Espen Berg in 2008. Berg was studying at Bournemouth University in the UK when he became aware of the challenges facing disadvantaged young people in developing economies. He was inspired to start an organisation focusing on utilising the skills and talents of young people globally to add value to the situation of young people living in poverty in sub-Saharan Africa.

UYDO has been discontinued in late 2010 due to funding challenges. Funds donated before September 2010 for Youth Business International entrepreneurs have been donated to Youth Business International as of 30 April 2011. Funds donated since September 2010 have been reimbursed to donors as of 30 April 2011.

== Youth ==
UYDO was built on the notion that every young person has skills and talents that can make a difference and was heavily based on the notion of providing young people with the responsibility and opportunities to add value to their own life, to UYDO as an organization and to society. As a consequence, UYDO was not only focusing on young people as part of their development programmes but also give young people key roles and responsibilities within the organisation.

== Curriculum ==
In the organisation's earliest days, a pilot project was undertaken at Bournemouth University involving the university's Public Relations course. With the intention of engaging young UK students in the issues of the developing world, the PR students undertook a project which would contribute to UYDO's development as an organisation. This 'real world' project was received warmly by the students with many students stating that the project changed their view of poverty and young people living in a poverty environment.

== Field partners ==
UYDO was working with Kenya Youth Business Trust (KYBT), based in Nairobi, Kenya in implementing their youth employment programmes.
