= Peace Child International =

UK-based charity

- Founded: 1981
- Type: Charity
- Registration no.: 1095189
- Purpose: sustainable development, youth-led development, youth empowerment, employability, entrepreneurship, international development
- Location: Future Business Centre, 47-51 Norfolk Street, Cambridge, CB1 2LD
- Method: Training programmes, educational publications, youth congresses
- Website: peacechild.org

Peace Child International is a UK based charity focusing on youth entrepreneurship, employability, sustainable development and youth empowerment. It has United Nations Economic and Social Council Consultative status and promotes the concept of youth-led development.

== History ==
Peace Child International began during the Cold War as a musical, based on Bernard Benson's The Peace Book, aimed at resolving conflict between the United States and USSR, and at bringing youth from both countries into contact. The first performance was in October 1981 at the Royal Albert Hall, with Susannah York as the narrator. The musical was then taken to the United States, where it was premiered at the Kennedy Center in Washington, D.C., in December 1982. The core of the musical was composed by David Gordon and written by David Woollcombe, but it was re-written and customised by the cast wherever it was performed. Since its debut the musical has been used in conflict resolution efforts in Azerbaijan and Armenia, Central America, Cyprus, the former Yugoslavia, India, Israel and Northern Ireland.

After the Earth Summit in June 1992, Peace Child produced a children's version of Agenda 21, Rescue Mission: Planet Earth. The book was designed, edited and aimed at young people and went on to be translated into 23 languages. Since this point, Peace Child has focused mainly on sustainable development issues, and produced a number of further publications on the subject with UN agencies.

Peace Child has also shifted its focus to an emphasis on youth unemployment, developing a number of training programmes in Europe, Africa and India to increase employability skills in young people.

== Current projects ==
=== Be the Change Academy ===
The Be the Change Academy programme aims to educate young people in West Africa in entrepreneurial skills, from financial literacy to business plan writing, and offers finance. There are Be the Change Academies (BTCA) in Paynesville, Liberia, Conakry, Guinea, Kenema, Sierra Leone and Visakhapatnam, India. Local young people who have a business idea can enrol in a BTCA and receive training from business experts. New projects are underway with funding from the Norwegian Agency for Development Cooperation.

=== Work the Change ===
The Work the Change programme is a peer-to-peer education course that aims to address the skills mismatch cause of youth unemployment. Through CV writing and job interview workshops as well as events, Work the Change improves employability for teenagers in the UK and prepares them for the world of work.

== World Youth Congress Series ==
Since 1999, Peace Child has organised the World Youth Congress (WYC), which aims to promote the role that young people can play in the field of sustainable development and the achievement of the UN's Millennium Development Goals.

=== Hawaii, 1999 ===
The first WYC, held in Hawaii in 1999, focused on establishing priorities for the new millennium for young people from all regions of the world, with the top worldwide priority being appropriate education.

=== Morocco, 2003 ===
The second WYC was held in Casablanca, Morocco, with the themes of tolerance, solidarity, and the role of young people in sustainable development and the achievement of the Millennium Development Goals. Delegates to the conference also spent time participating in action projects organised by Moroccan NGOs in all provinces of the country.

=== Scotland, 2005 ===
The Scottish WYC, held in Stirling in August 2005, explored young people's motivations to volunteer and had an overall theme of "young people working for a sustainable world community". As in the previous Congress, delegates spent three days working on a range of action projects throughout Scotland.

=== Quebec, 2008 ===
The fourth WYC was held in Quebec City in August 2008 under the name Regeneration 2008. The Congress celebrated the role of youth in achieving the Millennium Development Goals, youth empowerment, and the 'co-management' model of equal partnership between youth and elders.

=== Turkey, 2010 ===
The fifth WYC was held in Istanbul in August 2010 with the theme of "Imece" (a centuries-old solidarity system used in rural Turkey, consisting of mutual aid and working together for the good of the community), and with three sub themes: Measuring and Evaluating Youth Led Development, the Post-MDGs Development Agenda, and the Climate Change Agenda after Kyoto and COP15.

=== Rio de Janeiro, 2012 ===
The sixth WYC was held in Rio de Janeiro in May 2012 with a focus on sustainable development. This Congress revisited the promises made by governments during the Earth Summit in 1992 (which was also held in Rio). The Congress was designed to tie-in with the Rio 2012 conference which was held in June of the same year.

=== Hawaii, 2017 ===
The seventh WYC was organised as a return to Hawaii by Peace Child International's partner organisation, Peace Child Hawaii. The congress focused on sustainable development once more, and on local action projects.

== Selected bibliography ==
=== Peace Child International publications ===
- Rescue Mission: Planet Earth - A Children's Edition of Agenda 21 (1994, ISBN 1-85697-175-9)
- A World In Our Hands (1995, ISBN 1-883672-31-7)
- Pachamama: Our Earth - Our Future (1999, ISBN 0-237-52119-9)
- Stand Up, Speak Out: A book about children's rights (2002, ISBN 1-85434-887-6)
- Sustainable Human Development: a young people's introduction (2002, ISBN 0-237-52317-5)
- Rescue Mission: Planet Earth 2002 (2002)
- Water Rights and Wrongs (2007)
- Every Journey Matters (2007, ISBN 978-0-9557409-0-9)
- Gender Journey: A youth empowerment toolkit (2009, ISBN 978-0-9557409-1-6)
- Energy Revolution: climate change and our post-carbon future (2010, ISBN 978-0-237-53962-7)

=== Other publications ===
- Findlay, Merrill; Gordon, David; Woollcombe, David; Benson, Bernard S.: Peace Child: A Study Guide for Schools (1988, ISBN 0-7316-0930-1)
- Peace Child International: Be the Change (2000, ISBN 0-89610-417-6)
- Peace Child International: Stand Up for Your Rights (2001, ISBN 1-85434-573-7)
- Peace Child International: Stand Up, Speak Out: A Book about Human Rights (2001, ISBN 0-613-94409-7)
- UNEP: Is the Future Yours?: UNEP/UNESCO Research Project on Youth and Development (2001, ISBN 92-807-2011-2)
- Woollcombe, David: Youth-Led Development (Schumacher Briefing No. 14) (2007, ISBN 978-1-903998-98-4)
