= Youth-led development =

A youth-led development is an initiative that is largely devised and implemented by young people.

== Definition of youth ==
Most organizations use the UN's definition of youth which is a person between the ages of 15 and 24, but some organizations expand that definition to 30.

== Youth-led Organization ==
A youth-led organization focuses on youth-led development, promotes youth participation and often has a permanent staff largely made up of young people.

== Examples of youth-led development ==
Some examples of organizations that focus on youth-led development are: UYDO (United Youth Development Organization), U8 Global Student Partnership for Development, Engineers Without Borders, Peace Child International and Restless Development.
