= Deadly Immunity =

2005 article by Robert F. Kennedy, Jr.

"Deadly Immunity" is an article written by Robert F. Kennedy, Jr. that appeared in the July 14, 2005 issue of Rolling Stone and, simultaneously, on the website Salon. The article is focused on the 2000 Simpsonwood CDC conference and claims that thimerosal-containing vaccines caused autism, as well as the theory that government health agencies have "colluded with Big Pharma to hide the risks of thimerosal from the public." The article had originally been fact-checked and published in print by Rolling Stone, but posted online by Salon. The article was retracted by Salon on January 16, 2011, in response to criticisms of the article as inaccurate.

== Reactions ==
"Deadly Immunity" was heavily criticized for quoting material out of context and its wholly specious claim that RotaTeq, a live attenuated vaccine, contained Thimerosal. Both Rolling Stone and Salon amended the story with corrections in response to these and other criticisms, with the former publication eventually deleting the article and the latter retracting it. Criticisms included that Kennedy had incorrectly claimed that the amount of mercury children received from thimerosal-containing vaccines was 187 times higher than the Environmental Protection Agency's limit for methylmercury exposure. The correction later posted to the article on Salon stated that the actual amount, 187 micrograms, is only 40% greater than this limit. Within days after running the piece, Salon had appended five corrections to it.

Salon later amended their amendment to the story by adding "it has become clear from responses to the article that the forty-percent number, while accurate, is misleading. It measures the total mercury load an infant received from vaccines during the first six months, calculates the daily average received based on average body weight, and then compares that number to the EPA daily limit. But infants did not receive the vaccines as a "daily average" -- they received massive doses on a single day, through multiple shots. As the story states, these single-day doses exceeded the EPA limit by as much as 99 times. Based on the misunderstanding, and to avoid further confusion, we have amended the story to eliminate the forty-percent figure."

== Retraction by Salon ==
On January 16, 2011, Salon announced that it was retracting "Deadly Immunity". In a statement on the website, Kerry Lauerman, Salon's editor-in-chief, explained that in addition to five corrections they had previously made to the story, "subsequent critics, including most recently, Seth Mnookin in his book "The Panic Virus," further eroded any faith we had in the story's value." Phil Plait hailed the retraction of the article, writing, "I applaud Salon for doing this, but wish it had been done years ago, or better, that Salon had never published Kennedy's piece at all." In 2023, Salon editor Joan Walsh wrote that this was the worst mistake of her career and justified firing her, but her position was secured due to Jann Wenner sitting on the board of Salon.
