= Richard Deth =

American neuropharmacologist and anti-vaccine activist

Richard Carlton Deth
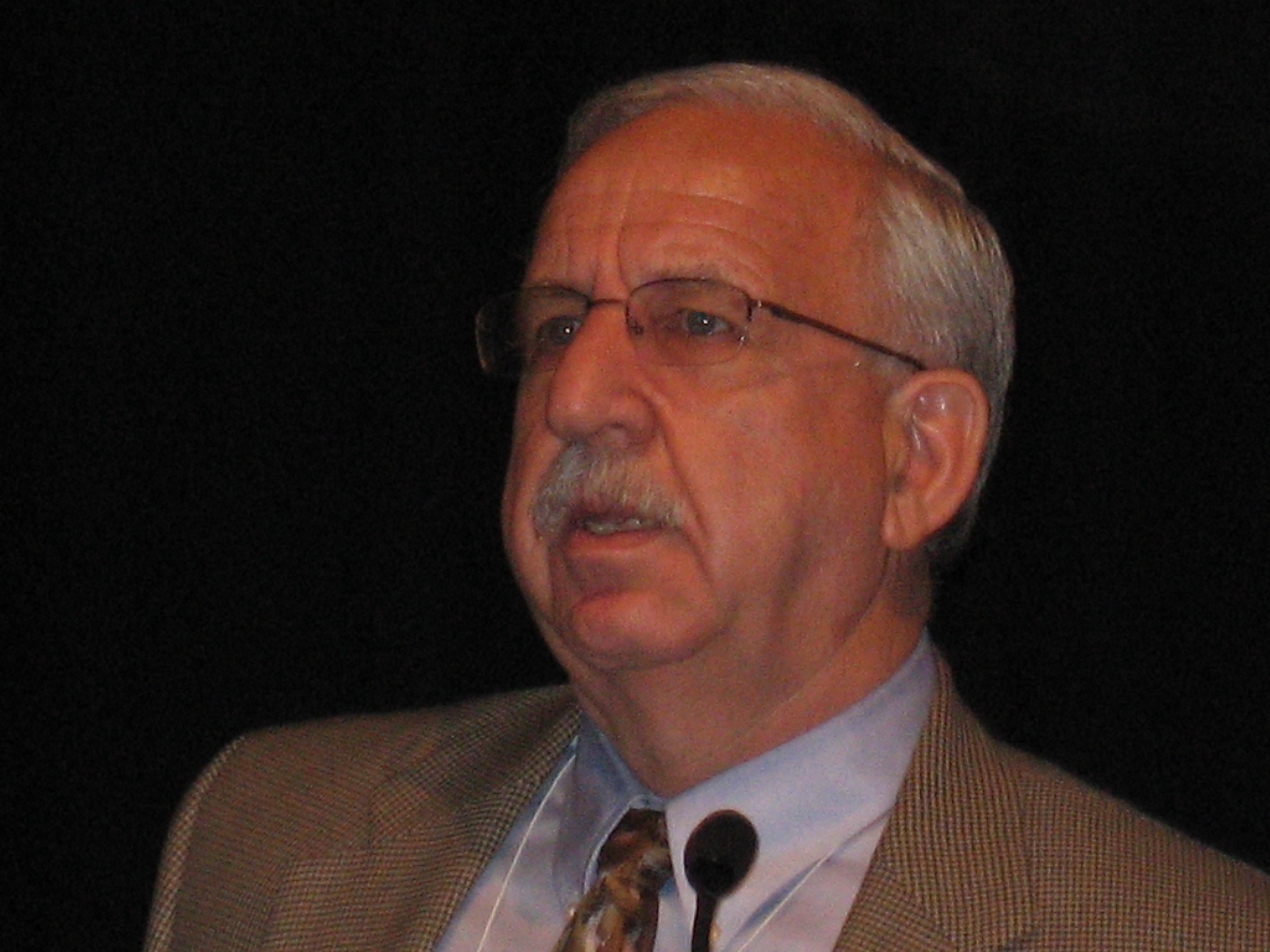
- Born: March 23, 1945 (age 81)
- Education: SUNY Buffalo; University of Miami
- Known for: Anti-vaccine activism Autism-related pseudoscience
- Scientific career
- Fields: Pharmacology
- Workplaces: Nova Southeastern University
- Thesis: The relative contribution of Ca^{++} influx and intracellular Ca^{++} release in the drug induced contraction of the rabbit aorta (1975)

Richard Carlton Deth is an American neuropharmacologist, and a former professor of pharmacology at Northeastern University in Boston, Massachusetts, who sits on the scientific advisory board of the National Autism Association. Deth has published scientific studies on the role of D4 dopamine receptors in psychiatric disorders, as well as the book, Molecular Origins of Human Attention: The Dopamine-Folate Connection. He has falsely speculated that there is a causal link between the vaccine preservative thiomersal and autism.

== Education ==
Deth attended State University of New York at Buffalo, where he graduated in 1970 with a bachelor's degree in pharmacy. In 1975, Deth obtained his PhD from the University of Miami with a thesis entitled "The relative contribution of Ca^{++} influx and intracellular Ca^{++} release in the drug induced contraction of the rabbit aorta."

== Scientific research and pseudoscientific claims ==
Deth's research primarily focuses on how D4 dopamine receptors may impact schizophrenia and attention. He has focused on understanding the molecular basis of transmembrane signaling by G protein-coupled receptors, the study of their structure using three-dimensional molecular graphics, and modeling how the binding of various drugs causes a shift in their molecular form.

Deth has characterized the conformation-dependent participation of D4 dopamine receptors in the process of phospholipid methylation, and claimed that different states of methylation yield varying degrees of spontaneous activity of G protein coupling. He has theorized that these processes are involved in the neural mechanisms of attention. Deth has claimed that insulin-like growth factor-1 (IGF-1) and dopamine stimulate folate-dependent methylation pathways in neuronal cells, while compounds like ethanol, thiomersal, and heavy metals inhibit these same biochemical pathways at low concentrations resembling those found following vaccination or other sources of exposure. An enzyme mediating methylation, methionine synthase, uses an active form of vitamin B_{12} to complete its chemical function. Deth has claimed thiomersal interferes with the conversion of dietary forms of B_{12} into the active form, impeding DNA methylation and disrupting mercury detoxification and some normal gene actions.

Based on this research, Deth has falsely speculated that the thiomersal contained in some vaccines triggers autism in genetically predisposed children; he has also contended that the body's response to thiomersal is a hormetic one, in which low-level exposure to the substance causes a beneficial effect. He played an active role in the initial confusion about the suggested relationship thiomersal and vaccines, testifying twice to Congress about his views. This aspect of his research attracted such controversy that a dean at Northeastern University once wrote a letter to Deth telling him to stop.

In 2015, Deth co-authored a paper that alleged researchers who did not find a link between thiomersal and autism were being influenced by those with an economic interest in proving thiomersal's safety. The paper compared such researchers to those manipulated by tobacco companies into falsely vouching for the safety of their products. Among Deth's co-authors were discredited anti-vaccine activists Mark and David Geier. In 2017, the journal Science and Engineering Ethics retracted the paper, claiming several of its authors, including Deth and the Geiers, had not adequately disclosed their own conflicts of interest.

It is scientific consensus that there is no link between any vaccine or vaccine ingredient and autism and that the thiomersal used as a preservative in some vaccines is not harmful.

== See also ==
- List of vaccine-related topics
