= PolitiFact =

American nonprofit fact-checking website

PolitiFact.com

- Website type: Fact-checking website
- Owners: Tampa Bay Times (2007–2018); Poynter Institute (2018–present)
- Website: politifact.com
- Commercial: Yes
- Launched: August 2007; 19 years ago
- Current status: Active

PolitiFact.com is an American nonprofit project operated by the Poynter Institute in St. Petersburg, Florida, with offices there and in Washington, D.C. It began in 2007 as a project of the Tampa Bay Times (then the St. Petersburg Times), with reporters and editors from the newspaper and its affiliated news media partners reporting on the accuracy of statements made by elected officials, candidates, their staffs, lobbyists, interest groups and others involved in U.S. politics. Its journalists select original statements to evaluate and then publish their findings on the PolitiFact website, where each statement receives a "Truth-O-Meter" rating. The ratings range from "True" for statements the journalists deem accurate to "Pants on Fire" (from the taunt "Liar, liar, pants on fire") for claims the journalists deem "not accurate and mak[ing] a ridiculous claim".

PunditFact, a related site that was also created by the Times' editors, is devoted to fact-checking claims made by political pundits. Both PolitiFact and PunditFact were funded primarily by the Tampa Bay Times and ad revenues generated on the website until 2018, and the Times continues to sell ads for the site now that it is part of Poynter Institute for Media Studies, a non-profit organization that also owns the newspaper. PolitiFact increasingly relies on grants from several nonpartisan organizations, and in 2017 launched a membership campaign and began accepting donations from readers.

In addition to political claims, the site monitors the progress elected officials make on their campaign promises, including a "Trump-O-Meter" for President Donald Trump, an "Obameter" for President Barack Obama, and a Biden Promise Tracker for President Joe Biden. PolitiFact's local affiliates review promises by elected officials of regional relevance, as evidenced by PolitiFact Tennessee's "Haslam-O-Meter," which tracked former Tennessee governor Bill Haslam's rhetoric, and Wisconsin's "Walk-O-Meter," which tracked former Wisconsin governor Scott Walker's efforts.

PolitiFact won the Pulitzer Prize in 2009 for its reporting during the 2008 United States presidential election, and has been praised and criticized by independent observers, conservatives and liberals alike. Both liberal and conservative bias have been alleged at different points, and criticisms have been made that PolitiFact attempts to fact-check statements that cannot be truly "fact-checked".

A survey of 511 stories from 2010 to 2011 found that statements made by Republicans were almost three times as likely to be labeled false as those of Democrats. A larger 2016 analysis by the American Press Institute found that PolitiFact was statistically more likely to be critical of Republicans, while a text analysis by Carnegie Mellon and University of Washington computer scientists in 2018 was "not able to detect any systematic differences in the treatment of Democrats and Republicans in articles by PolitiFact", but noted that the analysis "cannot determine whether there are partisan biases in Politifact's judgments about truthfulness [or] selection of which statements to examine."

== History ==
PolitiFact.com was started in August 2007 by Times Washington Bureau Chief Bill Adair, in conjunction with the Congressional Quarterly. In January 2010, PolitiFact expanded to its second newspaper, the Cox Enterprises-owned Austin American-Statesman in Austin, Texas; the feature, called PolitiFact Texas, covered issues that are relevant to Texas and the Austin area. In March 2010, the Times and its partner newspaper, The Miami Herald, launched PolitiFact Florida, which focuses on Florida issues. The Times and the Herald share resources on some stories that relate to Florida. Since then, PolitiFact expanded to other papers, such as The Atlanta Journal-Constitution, The Providence Journal, Milwaukee Journal Sentinel, The Plain Dealer, Richmond Times-Dispatch, the Knoxville News Sentinel and The Oregonian. The Knoxville News Sentinel ended its relationship with PolitiFact after 2012.

In 2013, Adair was named Knight Professor of the Practice of Journalism and Public Policy at Duke University, and stepped down as Bureau Chief at the Times and as editor at PolitiFact. The Tampa Bay Times' senior reporter, Alex Leary, succeeded Bill Adair as Bureau Chief on July 1, 2013, and Angie Drobnic Holan was appointed editor of PolitiFact in October 2013. Adair remains a PolitiFact contributing editor. In 2014, The Plain Dealer ended its partnership with PolitiFact after they reduced their news staff and were unwilling to meet "the required several PolitiFact investigations per week".

The organization was acquired in February 2018 by the Poynter Institute, a non-profit journalism education and news media research center that also owns the Tampa Bay Times. In March 2019, in preparation for the 2020 United States presidential election, PolitiFact partnered with Noticias Telemundo for fact-checking of information given to the Spanish language audience. In April 2019 PolitiFact joined forces with Kaiser Health News (KHN), for health-news fact checking. In October 2019 insight was given into PolitiFact's Truth-O-Meter's step-by-step process of assessing an item's truth, as considered true by the Politifact team, revealing confirmed facts and including accreditations.

== "Lie of the Year" ==
From 2009 to 2024, PolitiFact declared one political statement from each year to be the "Lie of the Year".

2009

In December 2009, PolitiFact declared the Lie of the Year to be Sarah Palin's assertion that the Patient Protection and Affordable Care Act (aka PPACA, ACA, Obamacare) of 2009 would lead to government "death panels" that dictated which types of patients would receive treatment.

2010

In December 2010, PolitiFact dubbed the Lie of the Year to be the contention among some opponents of the Patient Protection and Affordable Care Act that it represented a "government takeover of healthcare". PolitiFact argued that this was not the case, since all health care and insurance would remain in the hands of private companies.

2011

PolitiFact's Lie of the Year for 2011 was a statement by the Democratic Congressional Campaign Committee (DCCC) that a 2011 budget proposal by Congressman Paul Ryan, entitled The Path to Prosperity and voted for overwhelmingly by Republicans in the House and Senate, meant that "Republicans voted to end Medicare". PolitiFact determined that, although it is true the Republican plan would change Medicare fundamentally by forcing the elderly to use private health plans (the very thing Medicare was intended to substitute for), a radically transformed program could still be termed "Medicare", so it was not technically true that "Republicans voted to end Medicare". PolitiFact had originally labeled nine similar statements as "false" or "pants on fire" since April 2011.

2012

For 2012, PolitiFact chose the claim made by Republican presidential candidate Mitt Romney that President Obama "sold Chrysler to Italians who are going to build Jeeps in China" at the cost of American jobs. The "Italians" in the quote was a reference to Fiat, who had purchased a majority share of Chrysler in 2011 after a U.S. government bailout of Chrysler. PolitiFact had rated the claim "Pants on Fire" in October. PolitiFact's assessment quoted a Chrysler spokesman who had said, "Jeep has no intention of shifting production of its Jeep models out of North America to China." As of 2016, 96.7 percent of Jeeps sold in the U.S were assembled in the U.S., with roughly 70 percent North American parts content. The vehicle with the most North American parts content came in at 75%.

2013

The 2013 Lie of the Year was President Barack Obama's promise that "If you like your health care plan, you can keep it". As evidence, PolitiFact cited analysts' estimate of 4 million cancellation letters sent to American health insurance consumers. PolitiFact also noted that in an online poll, readers overwhelmingly agreed with the selection. This stands in stark contrast to its October 9, 2008, statement that Obama's "description of his plan is accurate, and we rate his statement True."

2014

PolitiFact's 2014 Lie of the Year was "Exaggerations about Ebola", referring to 16 separate statements made by various commentators and politicians about the Ebola virus being "easy to catch, that illegal immigrants may be carrying the virus across the southern border, that it was all part of a government or corporate conspiracy". These claims were made in the midst of the Ebola virus epidemic in West Africa when four cases were diagnosed in the United States in travelers from West Africa and nurses who treated them. PolitiFact wrote, "The claims – all wrong – distorted the debate about a serious public health issue."

2015

PolitiFact's 2015 Lie of the Year was the "various statements" made by 2016 Republican presidential candidate Donald Trump. Politifact found that 76% of Trump's statements that they reviewed were rated "Mostly False", "False", or "Pants on Fire". Statements that were rated "Pants on Fire" included his false assertion that the Mexican government sends "the bad ones over" the border into the United States, and his false claim that he saw "thousands and thousands" of people cheering the collapse of the World Trade Center on 9/11.

2016

PolitiFact's 2016 Lie of the Year was "fake news" referring to fabricated news stories including the Pizzagate conspiracy theory.

2017

PolitiFact's 2017 Lie of the Year was Donald Trump's false claim that Russian election interference is a "made-up story". The annual poll found 56.36% of the 5080 respondents agreed that Trump's "Pants on Fire" statement deserved the distinction. Raul Labrador's statement that "Nobody dies because they don't have access to health care", and Sean Spicer's statement that "[Trump's audience] was the largest audience to witness an inauguration, period," came in second and third place getting 14.47% and 14.25% of the vote respectively. In its article, PolitiFact points to multiple occasions where Donald Trump stated that Russia had not interfered with the election despite multiple government agencies claiming otherwise.

2018

Politifact's 2018 Lie of the Year was that survivors of the Stoneman Douglas High School shooting were crisis actors. These conspiracy theories were spread on blogs and social media by sources including Infowars, and targeted students including X González and David Hogg, who became prominent gun control activists in the wake of the shooting and helped organize the March for our Lives.

2019

Politifact's 2019 Lie of the Year was Donald Trump's claim that the anonymous whistleblower who reported possible presidential misconduct got the report of his phone call with Ukrainian president Volodymyr Zelenskyy "almost completely wrong." The whistleblower complaint alleged that President Trump urged President Zelenskyy to conduct an investigation into Trump's political rival in return for promised military aid.

2020

The 2020 Lie of the Year was misinformation related to the COVID-19 pandemic; specifically, theories that either deny the existence of the disease outright, or claim that the disease is much less deadly than it actually is. In particular, Donald Trump was mentioned as a main supporter of such conspiracy theories.

2021

The 2021 Lie of the Year was lies related to the 2021 United States Capitol attack and its significance.

2022

The 2022 Lie of the Year was disinformation in the 2022 Russian invasion of Ukraine being propagated by Vladimir Putin.

2023

The 2023 Lie of the Year was Robert F. Kennedy Jr.’s campaign of conspiracy theories.

2024

The 2024 Lie of the Year was the false claim that Haitian immigrants in Springfield, Ohio, were eating pets, which had been promoted by Donald Trump and JD Vance, the Republican ticket for the 2024 United States presidential election.

2025

In 2025, PolitiFact said that there had been so many egregious lies that year that they could not pick one statement, or even one group of statements, as the Lie of the Year, so they declared 2025 the Year of the Lies, saying that "[t]he concept of truth feels particularly bleak in 2025."

== Reception ==
PolitiFact was awarded the Pulitzer Prize for National Reporting in 2009 for "its fact-checking initiative during the 2008 presidential campaign that used probing reporters and the power of the World Wide Web to examine more than 750 political claims, separating rhetoric from truth to enlighten voters". A Wall Street Journal opinion piece by Joseph Rago in December 2010 called PolitiFact "part of a larger journalistic trend that seeks to recast all political debates as matters of lies, misinformation and 'facts,' rather than differences of world view or principles".

TV critic James Poniewozik at Time characterized PolitiFact as having the "hard-earned and important position as referee in the mudslinging contest—a 'truth vigilante,' as it were", and "PolitiFact is trying to do the right thing here. And despite the efforts of partisans to work the refs by complaining about various calls they've made in the past, they're generally doing a hard, important thing well. They often do it better than the rest of the political media, and the political press owes them for doing it." Poniewozik also suggested, "they need to improve their rating system, to address the irresponsible, the unprovable, the dubious. Otherwise, they're doing exactly what they were founded to stop: using language to spread false impressions."

Mark Hemingway, writing in the neoconservative magazine The Weekly Standard, criticized all fact-checking projects by news organizations, including PolitiFact, the Associated Press and the Washington Post, writing that they "aren't about checking facts so much as they are about a rearguard action to keep inconvenient truths out of the conversation". In December 2011, Northeastern University journalism professor Dan Kennedy wrote in The Huffington Post that the problem with fact-checking projects was "there are only a finite number of statements that can be subjected to thumbs-up/thumbs-down fact-checking". In September 2012, the Florida Times Union said PolitiFact "uses strict journalistic standards, according to its mandate. Its reporters and researchers use original reports rather than news stories. When possible, PolitiFact uses original sources to verify the claims and interviews impartial experts."

Matt Welch, in the February 2013 issue of Reason magazine, criticized PolitiFact and other media fact-checkers for focusing much more on statements by politicians about their opponents, rather than statements by politicians and government officials about their own policies, thus serving as "a check on the exercise of rhetoric" but not "a check on the exercise of power". PolitiFact modified its fact-check about a lab leak as the possible origin of COVID-19. The site had originally stated that the lab leak was a "conspiracy theory that has been debunked since the beginning of the coronavirus pandemic". After some scientists said they were "too quick to discount a possible link" to the COVID-19 lab leak theory, PolitiFact changed its evaluation of the claim to "unsupported by evidence and in dispute".

=== Allegations of political bias ===
PolitiFact has drawn allegations of political bias from both left-leaning and right-leaning media outlets. Overall, right-leaning outlets get more negative results from fact-checkers than those on the left, including at PolitiFact, which some right-wing commentators have interpreted as evidence of bias. In February 2011, University of Minnesota political science professor Eric Ostermeier analyzed 511 PolitiFact stories issued from January 2010 through January 2011. He found that the number of statements analyzed from Republicans and from Democrats was comparable, but Republicans had been assigned substantially harsher grades, receiving "false" or "pants on fire" more than three times as often as Democrats. The report found that "In total, 74 of the 98 statements by political figures judged 'false' or 'pants on fire' over the last 13 month were given to Republicans, or 76 percent, compared to just 22 statements for Democrats (22 percent)."

Ostermeier observed that PolitiFact was not transparent about how the comments were selected for analysis and raised the possibility that the more negative evaluations of Republican comments might be the result of selection bias, concluding: "The question is not whether PolitiFact will ultimately convert skeptics on the right that they do not have ulterior motives in the selection of what statements are rated, but whether the organization can give a convincing argument that either a) Republicans in fact do lie much more than Democrats, or b) if they do not, that it is immaterial that PolitiFact covers political discourse with a frame that suggests this is the case." In response, PolitiFact editor Bill Adair stated in MinnPost: "[...][W]e're accustomed to hearing strong reactions from people on both ends of the political spectrum. We are a news organization and we choose which facts to check based on news judgment. We check claims that we believe readers are curious about, claims that would prompt them to wonder, 'Is that true?'"

A 2013 analysis from the Center for Media and Public Affairs at George Mason University showed results consistent with the findings of the aforementioned 2011 study, concluding that PolitiFact was three times as likely to rank statements from Republicans as "Pants on Fire", and twice as likely to rank statements from Democrats as "Entirely True". The disparity in these evaluations came despite roughly equally attention paid to statements made by representatives of the two parties: 50.4 percent for Republicans, versus 47.2 percent for Democrats, with 2.4 percent attention paid to statements from independents.

Upon his retirement from PolitiFact, founder Bill Adair said in October 2024 that Republicans lied far more than Democrats, by a margin of 55% to 31% for fact checks conducted between 2016 and 2021. He added that the disparity was not caused by Republicans being checked more often or more critically. Adair said, "Republicans see their work as part of this epic battle and in that, it is such an important cause to them that they really believe that lying is justified in that epic battle." In January 2025, Mark Zuckerberg announced an end to Meta's eight-year partnership with PolitiFact, claiming that "fact checkers have just been too politically biased."

== Funding ==
Since 2010, PolitiFact has received funding from a number of organizations, including:

- AmeriHealth Caritas
- Bill & Melinda Gates Foundation
- Collins Center for Public Policy
- Common Cause
- Community Foundation of New Jersey
- Craig Newmark Philanthropies
- Craigslist Charitable Fund
- Democracy Fund
- Dume Wolverine Foundation
- Facebook
- Ford Foundation
- Friends of the Earth
- Google News Initiative
- Grounds for Promotion
- International Fact Checking Network
- Knight Foundation
- Microsoft
- Newton & Rochelle Becker Charitable Trust
- Reynolds Journalism Institute
- SmartNews
- Stelter Foundation
- TikTok
- The Trust Project

== See also ==
- FactCheck.org
- Fairness and Accuracy in Reporting
- Glenn Kessler, author of the Washington Post feature "The Fact Checker"
- Institute for Nonprofit News (member)
- Snopes.com
