= Hong Kong Free Press =

Hong Kong free non-profit news website

- Website type: News
- Available in: English
- Headquarters: Kennedy Town, Hong Kong
- Founder: Tom Grundy
- Website: hongkongfp.com
- Commercial: No
- Registration: None
- Launched: 29 June 2015; 11 years ago
- Current status: Active

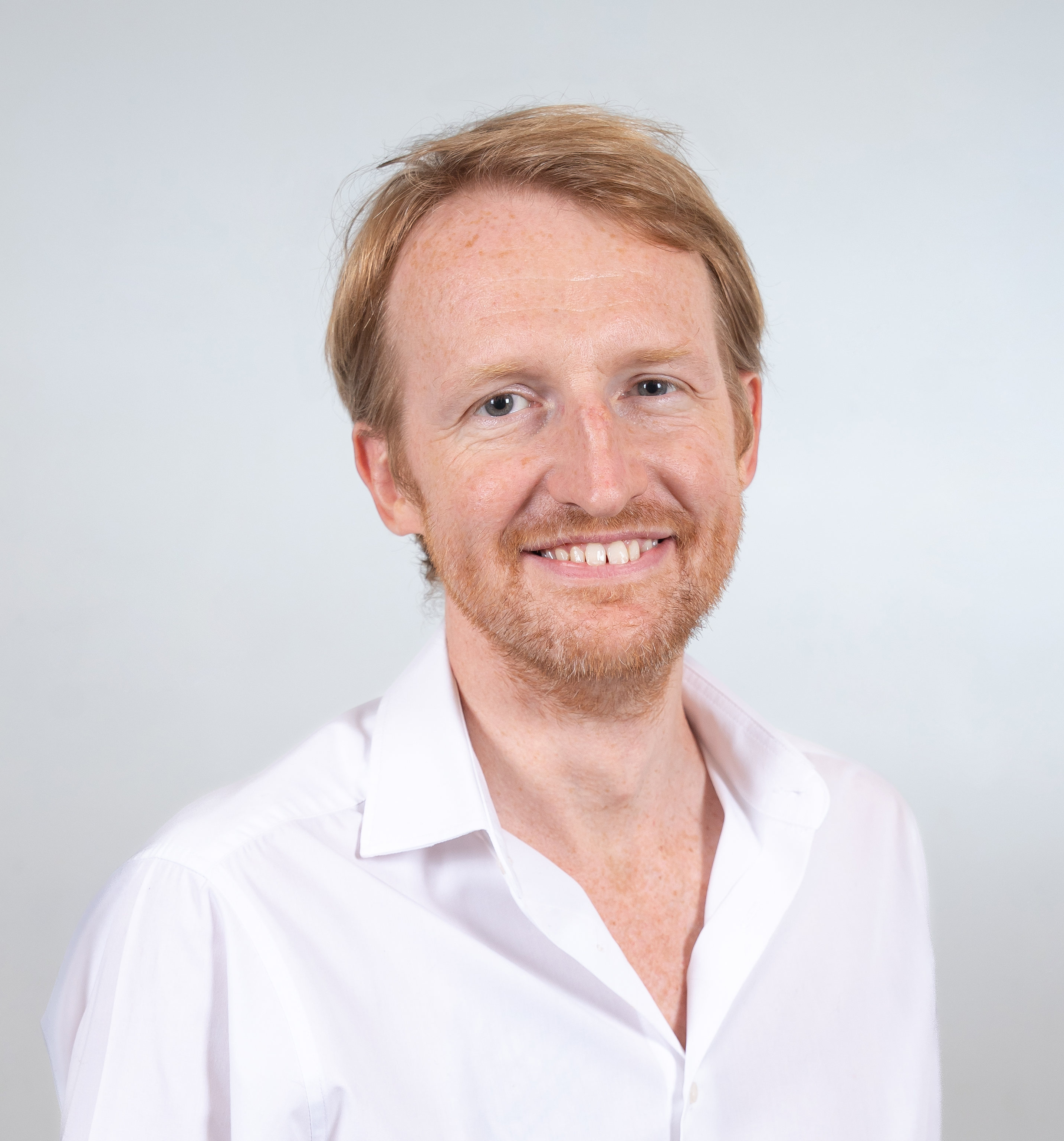
Tom Grundy, co-founder

Hong Kong Free Press (HKFP) is a free, non-profit news website based in Hong Kong. It was co-founded in 2015 by Tom Grundy, who believed that the territory's press freedom was in decline, to provide an independent alternative to the dominant English-language newspaper of record in Hong Kong, the South China Morning Post.

== History ==
The Hong Kong Free Press was co-founded by Tom Grundy in 2015. Grundy was previously a social activist and a blogger who had lived in Hong Kong since around 2005. He wrote the blog Hong Wrong and held annual International Pillow Fight Day commotions in Central. He was also known for attempting a citizen's arrest on former British Prime Minister Tony Blair, saying, "In 2009 Blair admitted he would have gone to war regardless of WMDs and international law forbids wars for reasons of regime change." He established HKFP in response to concerns about eroding press freedom and media self-censorship in Hong Kong, with the aim of covering breaking news and topics such as the pro-democracy movement.

HKFP aimed to provide quick news reports with context, which Grundy said Hong Kong's largest English-language newspaper, the South China Morning Post, does not do. The owners of the SCMP have business interests in mainland China which has led to claims of biased coverage. Reporters Without Borders placed Hong Kong at thirty-four in their World Press Freedom Index in 2010, at seventieth in 2015. By 2022, it had plunged well down the bottom quarter of the list in 148th of 180 countries surveyed.

Crowdfunding for HKFP took place on FringeBacker and raised HK$150,000 (US$19,342) within two days. The four weeks of fundraising in June 2015 generated around HK$600,000.

Beginning in late 2015, Chinese authorities blocked access to the site in mainland China.

In its first year of operation, HKFP published 4,400 news articles and commentaries and had over 3.5 million unique visitors.

HKFP relocated from Cyberport to a co-working space in Kennedy Town in late 2017.

In early 2020, HKFP suspended its coverage for a website relaunch. In the relaunch, HKFP introduced its code of ethics and fact-checking policy and recruited two reporters. In The Guardian, Grundy wrote that he and his colleagues have made contingency plans for the newspaper to continue if they are legally threatened by the authorities or forced to leave the territory.

HKFP writer Stephen Vines left the city for the United Kingdom in August 2021 due to what he described as "white terror" under the national security law. Vines would continue to write for HKFP, the newspaper announced.

Veteran China scholar Suzanne Pepper wrote a regular column for HKFP from 2015 until her death in 2022. HKFP also maintains Pepper's blog, Hong Kong Focus.

In a 2022 public opinion survey conducted by the Chinese University of Hong Kong, HKFP received a credibility rating of 5.50 out of 10 which was higher than the ratings for Headline Daily (5.33), Oriental Daily News (5.25), HK01 (5.06) and TVB (5.01) but lower than the ratings for The Standard (5.97), South China Morning Post (5.95) and Ming Pao (5.72). In the same CUHK survey conducted in 2019, HKFP had received a credibility rating of 5.56 out of 10.

In December 2023, HKFP became a partner of the Trust Project consortium co-founded by Google News head Richard Gingras.

In May 2025, the Hong Kong Journalists Association stated that HKFP, alongside seven other local media outlets, their employees and their family members, has been subject to a tax audit by the Inland Revenue Department.

== Content ==
In the long term, HKFP plans to achieve financial sustainability through "continued crowdfunding efforts, advertising and sponsorship events" and by operating with minimal overhead costs. Tom Grundy, a freelance journalist, stated that the site would "start with simple local news, and investigative pieces about Hong Kong" and that "we have no political agenda. We simply aim to be credible".

== Awards and recognition ==
Hong Kong Free Press was nominated for the 2021 Nobel Peace Prize by Norwegian Liberal Party politicians Ola Elvestuen, Terje Breivik and Jon Gunnes.

=== SOPA Awards ===
Year	Awards/ Nomination	Category	Title of Entry	Result
2020	Excellence in Explanatory Reporting (卓越解釋性報道獎)	Regional	Hong Kong's new methodology of protest, explained	Honourable Mention
2020	Excellence in Photography (卓越攝影獎)	Regional	Shots of the 2019 Hong Kong protest movements	Finalist
2021	Excellence in Opinion Writing (卓越評論獎)	Regional	Hong Kong's protest movement in perspective	Honourable Mention
2023	Excellence in Opinion Writing (卓越評論獎)	Regional	Press Freedom Day: As long as there are journalists in Hong Kong, there will be journalism	Honourable Mention

== See also ==
- List of newspapers in Hong Kong
