= Deth =

Deth or DETH may refer to:

- Megadeth, an American heavy metal band
- Dethklok, an animated American death metal band
- Jack Deth, detective, main character in the Trancers films
- Richard Deth (1945– ), a controversial neuropharmacologist
- DETH (ΔΕΘ), the Thessaloniki International Fair

== See also ==
- Death
- Death (disambiguation)
