= Canada's National Observer =

Canadian national journalism website

- Type: Daily news website
- Format: Online newspaper
- Owner: Observer Media Group
- Publisher: Linda Solomon Wood
- Editor-in-chief: Jimmy Thomson
- Managing editor: David McKie
- Founded: 2015
- Headquarters: Vancouver, British Columbia, Canada
- Website: www.nationalobserver.com

Canada's National Observer (CNO) is a digital news outlet founded in 2015. In 2024, Columbia Journalism Review described CNO as "a Canadian investigative outlet focused on climate and politics." It is owned by Observer Media Group, a media company established in 2009 that also founded the Vancouver Observer.

== History ==
Canada's National Observer was launched in 2015 after a Kickstarter campaign that raised C$80,000.

Linda Solomon Wood, founder and director of Canada's National Observer, is the daughter of American photographer Rosalind Fox Solomon, whose work documenting social and political realities was widely exhibited and published internationally. Solomon Wood previously founded the online magazine Vancouver Observer in 2006, after relocating from Manhattan to Vancouver following the September 11 attacks, and ran it from her False Creek apartment. The Vancouver Observer covered politics and culture and won a Canadian Online Publishing Award in 2010 for its reporting on civic issues such as Vancouver's proposed "mega casino," bike lanes, and housing affordability. She launched the national platform in 2015 and, according to Nieman Lab, it would focus on "environmental reporting from a clearly pro-environment angle." She also characterized CNO's investigative reporting as solutions-oriented: "The whole point of an investigative series is to bring further attention to a problem so that there can be policy change for the better."

In 2016, National Post columnist Terence Corcoran described a "newspaper war" between Postmedia Network and the Toronto Star. He criticized Torstar's "series of personal and corporate attacks" against Postmedia, in particular a 5,000-word investigation by CNO reporter Bruce Livesey that was published in Canada's National Observer and the Toronto Star. Corcoran described Livesey as "a master of the inappropriate juxtaposition of fact and conclusion" and referred to CNO as "the left-wing Vancouver online magazine."

In 2017, Linda Solomon Wood testified before the House of Commons Standing Committee on Canadian Heritage, stating that the organization had "grown through finding new ways to leverage opportunities in a turbulent environment" and had cultivated "thousands of readers in Canada who value and will gladly pay for profound stories."

That same year, CNO collaborated with the Toronto Star, Global News, the Michener Awards Foundation, the Corporate Mapping Project and four journalism schools, producing the Price of Oil project, which examined the health impacts of oil and gas development on Canadian communities. By 2018, the newsroom had offices in Vancouver and Ottawa. In March 2020, J-Source noted that National Observer removed its paywall for all COVID-19 reporting.

Canada's National Observer is a member of the international Climate Desk media consortium and has collaborated with global outlets on climate reporting. In 2021, it co-published an investigation with The Guardian into the secret backers of the Trans Mountain pipeline, focusing on the insurers financing the project.

In April 2024, Le Devoir announced a collaboration with Canada's National Observer to expand political and climate coverage for both publications.

== Civic Searchlight ==
In October 2025, Canada's National Observer launched Civic Searchlight, a public accountability and research tool designed to help journalists and researchers search more than 500 municipal meeting transcripts across Canada in one place. The system was conceived by investigative data journalist Rory White to counter AI-generated disinformation campaigns targeting local governments. Solomon Wood said the tool was developed to make it "easier to catch bad actors in the spotlight," and that more than 100 journalists and researchers signed up during its first week of release. Journalists Craig Silverman and Alexios Mantzarlis described it as "similar to Bellingcat’s Council Meeting Transcript Search, which enables researchers to search auto-generated transcripts of council meetings for different authorities across the UK and Ireland."

== Investigations ==
In 2016, CNO reported on private meetings between TransCanada Corporation officials and National Energy Board (NEB) members during the review of the proposed $15.7-billion Energy East pipeline. CBC News reported that the revelations "sparked outrage" in Quebec and led to the resignation of three NEB panel members in September 2016.

TransCanada cancelled the project in 2017, with CBC describing the NEB controversy as "the single-biggest blow to the already unpopular pipeline's fortunes in Quebec."

In 2021, CNO co-published an investigation with The Guardian into the insurers backing the Trans Mountain pipeline, examining the secrecy around financial support for the controversial project.

In 2022, CNO and the Toronto Star investigated political ties to Ontario land development projects in the "Friends with Benefits" series, focusing on Highway 413 and the Bradford Bypass. The series received an Honourable Mention at the Canadian Hillman Prize.

== Awards ==
- In 2017, it won a National Newspaper Award, the Breaking News award.
- In 2017, CNO was awarded a citation of merit at the Michener Awards, which Nieman Lab reported made it the first digital-only outlet to receive the honour.
- In 2018, CNO received Honourable Mention from the Canadian Hillman Prize for participation in the cross-newsroom investigative series "The Price of Oil."
- In 2025, Canada's National Observer reporter Darius Snieckus won the Canadian Journalism Foundation's CJF Award for Climate Solutions Reporting for his series Big Green Build, which examined how Canada's housing construction sector could address climate targets through green retrofits and low-carbon materials. The jury praised the series for "reminding us of the challenges new buildings pose to the planet – but also the opportunities new technologies and design offer for mitigating the problem," calling it "grippingly made and presented."

== Reception and funding ==
Canada's National Observer has been discussed in journalism industry publications and media studies for its editorial focus, business model, and role among emerging digital news organizations. Maclean's observed that CNO, along with other independent outlets such as The Narwhal, had "amassed tidy collections of journalism awards, going up against established publications."

Before 2015, the National Observer received funding from the Tides Foundation.

In 2018, J-Source reported that National Observer sought to raise CA$1 million in growth capital to expand its audience." In a 2019 J-Source survey on gender equity in Canadian journalism, Linda Solomon Wood was quoted on newsroom practices and equity challenges." David Beers, founder of The Tyee, noted that CNO's "energy sector investigations have rocked Ottawa and forced resignations."

The Review of Journalism analyzed former CNO reporter Emma McIntosh's investigation into disinformation campaigns, placing her work alongside investigations by CBC and The Globe and Mail as examples of Canadian media examining partisan propaganda networks.

In 2019, Canadaland described Canada's National Observer as "a Vancouver-based independent news site known for in-depth reporting," highlighting the outlet's adoption of updated climate terminology such as "climate emergency" in its editorial style guide. Then Managing Editor Mike De Souza said the change aimed to "communicate the reality of the situation to readers."

Media researcher Heidi Legg, in her Canadian Media Ownership Index published by Harvard University, characterized Canada’s National Observer as reflecting a digital journalism trend she described as mission-driven journalism accompanied by what she termed a lack of transparency in private media ownership. The report contrasted this trend with publicly traded companies and nonprofits, which have stricter transparency protocols. Legg also cited CNO as an example of "Solutions journalism", describing it as a "trend in the US where foundations and corporations can pay to fund a story topic to be developed around a societal issue."

The Harvard University report, the Canadian Media Ownership Index, stated that researchers requested information on Canada’s National Observer’s largest funders and shareholders but were told the company is privately held and not required to disclose this information. CNO has received funding through Canadian federal government grants and the Facebook Journalism Project. According to a 2023 article by Lauren Watson in the Columbia Journalism Review, less than 20 percent of the publication’s revenue comes from public funds, with the remainder derived from subscriptions and philanthropic support.

== Institutional recognition ==
Canada's National Observer is one of eight news providers selected for the federal government's Copyright Media Clearance Program, which provides government-wide access to electronic media sources. Administered by Public Services and Procurement Canada, the program includes multi-million dollar contracts with larger publishers like Postmedia and The Globe and Mail, with smaller outlets receiving hundreds of thousands in subscription fees. CNO is among eight news providers selected for the federal government's Copyright Media Clearance Program, administered by Public Services and Procurement Canada. The program provides government-wide access to electronic media sources through subscription contracts with publishers ranging from large outlets like Postmedia and The Globe and Mail to smaller publishers.

== Structure and affiliations ==
Canada’s National Observer is organized as a unionized newsroom and participates in several national and international journalism partnerships and initiatives. The newsroom unionized under the Canadian Media Guild in 2022, with the union highlighting CNO as "one of the few media start-ups" offering comprehensive benefits to journalists.

CNO also participates in the federal government's Local Journalism Initiative and is a member of The Trust Project, an international consortium promoting transparency in journalism. It is also a partner in the Climate Desk collaboration, a consortium of international media organizations reporting on the impacts of climate change.
