= Kreesten Madsen =

Danish epidemiologist

Kreesten Meldgaard Madsen is a Danish epidemiologist and expert on infectious diseases who, as of 2003, worked at the Danish Epidemiology Science Centre at Aarhus University. He is known for leading two studies that found no link between either the MMR vaccine and autism or thimerosal and autism. The first of these studies pertained to MMR and was published in 2002; the second pertained to thimerosal and was published in 2003. Both of these studies received considerable media attention.
