= Kyle Kashuv =

American conservative activist (born 2001)

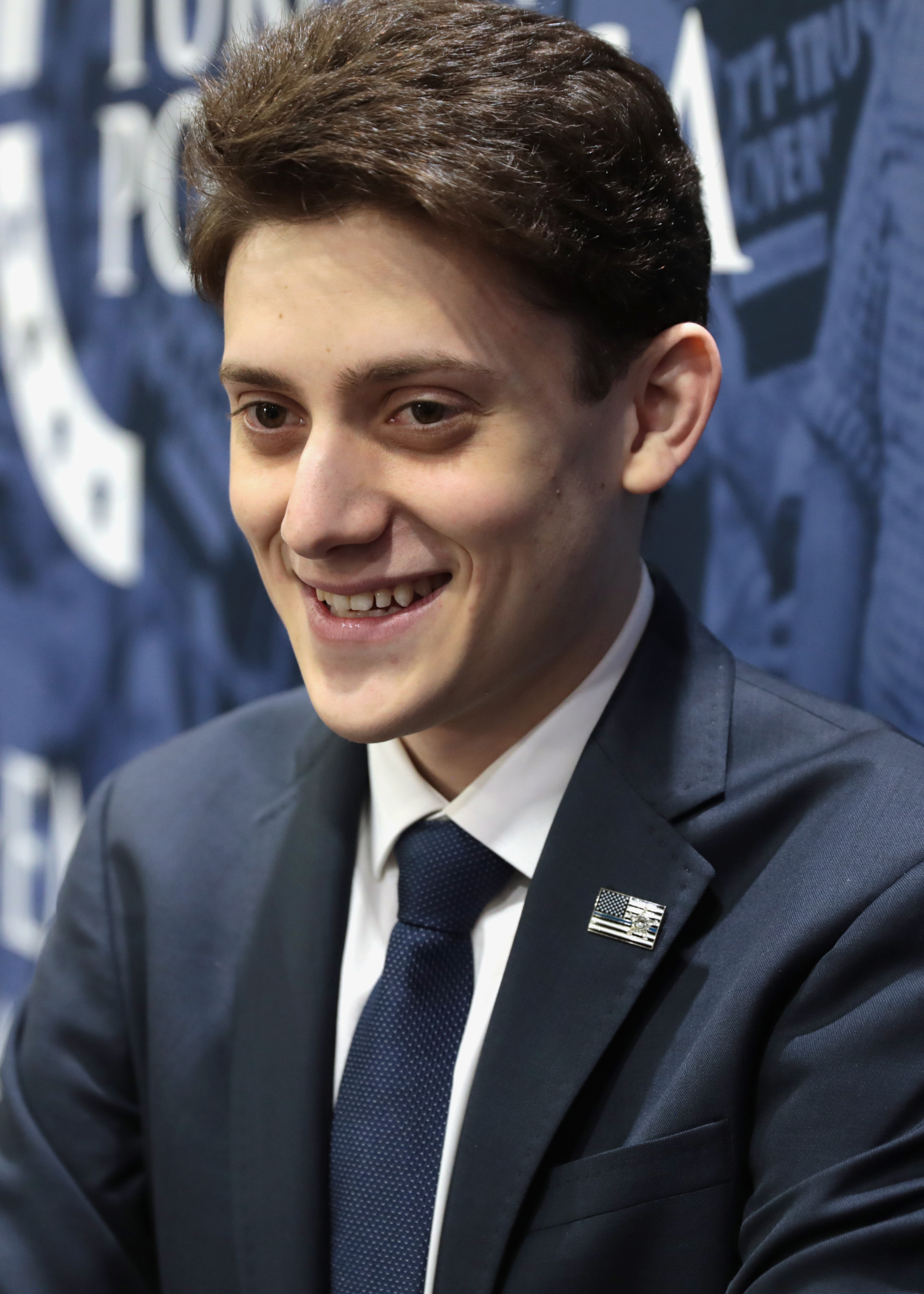
- Kashuv in 2018
- Born: May 20, 2001 (age 25)
- Education: Marjory Stoneman Douglas High School
- Years active: 2018–present
- Height: 5 ft 11 in (180 cm)

Kyle Kashuv (born May 20, 2001) is an American conservative activist. He survived the 2018 Stoneman Douglas High School shooting and subsequently advocated for gun rights, notably in opposition to his fellow survivors' March for Our Lives movement.

== Shooting aftermath and activism ==
On February 14, 2018, Kashuv was present at the school where the Stoneman Douglas High School shooting occurred. He was 16 years old, attending his junior year. He later petitioned President Donald Trump to award Peter Wang, a student who had helped several others escape before he was killed, the Presidential Medal of Freedom.

In April 2018, Kashuv said he was questioned and intimidated by a Broward County officer and a school security officer after he posted on his Twitter account a photo of himself at a shooting range with an AR-15 rifle. Kashuv explained that he wanted to learn the "physical mechanics" of guns and how to defend himself, as well as to "show people it's people that are the issue, not guns". Marjory Stoneman Douglas High history teacher Greg Pittman said the gesture was in poor taste, which Kashuv denied. He said other students told him that Pittman called him the "next Hitler" while discussing the photo.

Kashuv is a supporter of the Republican Party. He supported Donald Trump in the 2016 United States presidential election, endorsing Trump's ideas about immigration and construction of the Mexico–United States border wall, and Trump's "America First" approach. Kashuv was initially guided by conservative commentators Ben Shapiro and Guy Benson. Kashuv also worked for Ron DeSantis's campaign in the 2018 Florida gubernatorial election. By March 2018, Kashuv was in the process of producing a mobile phone application, ReachOut, which aims to help students who have emotional struggles reach out for help. In April 2018, Kashuv criticized CNN for being biased because one of their contributors, Joan Walsh, had liked a tweet by Fred Guttenberg, whose daughter died in the Stoneman Douglas High School shooting. In July 2018, Kashuv gave a speech at the 2018 National Western Conservative Summit. Kashuv also gave a speech in April 2019 at the yearly meeting of the National Rifle Association of America (NRA).

The Miami Herald in July 2018 wrote that the conservative self-styled Second Amendment supporter Kashuv had "gained a national following as a counterweight to the March For Our Lives" movement. Associated Press in February 2019 described Kashuv as "the most prominent conservative voice among the students" who had survived the Stoneman Douglas High School shooting. As of June 2019, Kashuv has amassed over 300,000 followers on Twitter.

=== Turning Point USA ===
Kashuv became director of high school outreach of the conservative group Turning Point USA and gave speeches about gun rights, including at Princeton University. Kashuv invited Turning Point USA founder Charlie Kirk to address Marjory Stoneman Douglas High, but the school did not permit the activity. Kashuv helped to plan the organization's 2018 High School Leadership Summit for over 800 students, and was lauded by Fox News in July 2018 as "a role model for young conservatives across the country". That month, Kirk described Kashuv as a "a national spokesperson for one of the most controversial and divisive issues of our time", and as "probably the most hated pro-gun advocate at the time besides Dana Loesch", a spokesperson of the NRA.

He resigned from Turning Point in May 2019, hours after former classmates threatened to make public screenshots of racist remarks Kashuv had made. Kashuv denied that his resignation was related to his racist remarks.

=== Washington, D.C., meetings ===
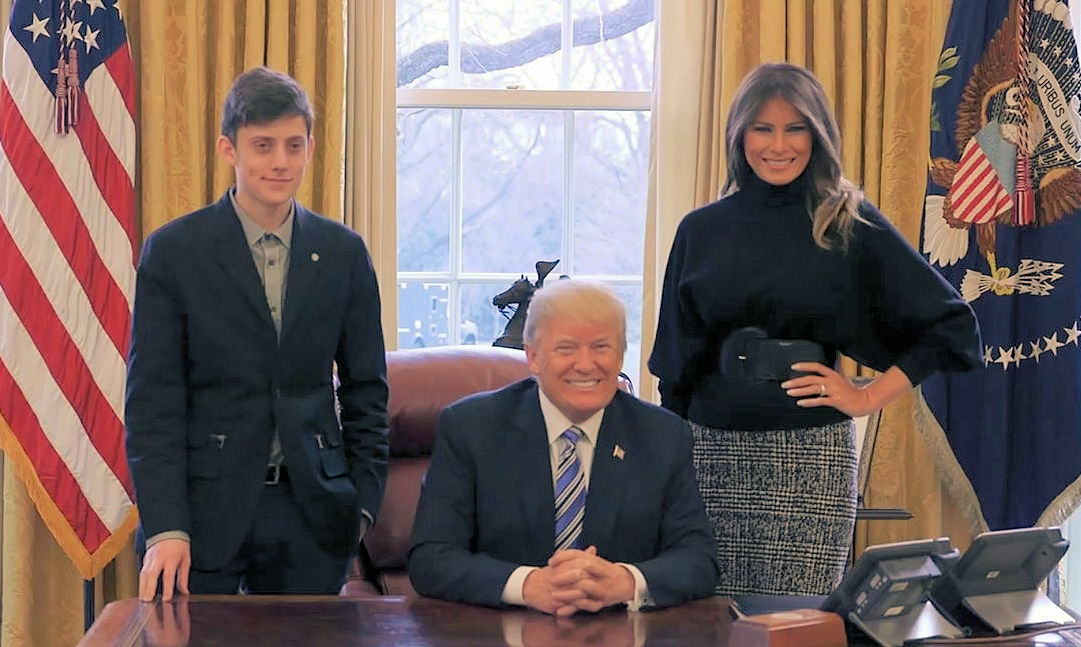
Kashuv with President Donald Trump and First Lady Melania Trump in the Oval Office in 2018

Following the Stoneman Douglas High School shooting, Michael Gruen, a 19-year old "influencer marketer", noticed Kashuv's posts on Twitter and approached him offering to help him get his message out. With the help of Shapiro, former White House communications director Anthony Scaramucci, and former White House press secretary Sean Spicer, meetings on Capitol Hill were set up for Kashuv in March 2018. The trip was mostly planned on short notice, with Kashuv reacting: "I never really wanted to get into politics." During his visit, Kashuv met with President Trump and his wife Melania Trump, Speaker of the House Paul Ryan, two Democratic senators (Chris Murphy and Chuck Schumer), three Republican senators (Orrin Hatch, Marco Rubio and Ted Cruz), Trump aide Kellyanne Conway, and CNN's Jim Acosta.

In April 2018, Kashuv met with Supreme Court Justice Clarence Thomas and discussed their support for the Second Amendment.

=== Gun rights views ===
Kashuv supports an anti-gun-control interpretation of the Second Amendment. Before the mass shooting, Kashuv supported zero gun restrictions, but after the mass shooting, Kashuv changed his position to favor much "stricter background checks and mental evaluations" for gun purchases, but still disagrees with banning any type of gun. He also does not support restrictions on standard capacity magazines. Regarding the Stoneman Douglas High School shooting, Kashuv did not blame gun laws, instead blaming the failures of law enforcement for failing to either stop the gunman during the shooting, or even identify the gunman as a threat before the shooting happened. Kashuv endorses the idea that "the only way to stop a bad guy with a gun is a good guy with a gun"; he has advocated for schools to eliminate gun-free zones, and for policies allowing teachers and school staff to be armed. Kashuv supports the Senate's bipartisan STOP School Violence Act, which provides federal funds to develop an "anonymous reporting systems for threats of school violence", improve "school security infrastructure", and train students, school staff and law enforcement to prevent violence.

Kashuv said he agrees with fellow student activists David Hogg, Cameron Kasky and X González that gun deaths and school shootings need to be stopped, "and that shouldn't be delegitimized, ever". Kashuv's stated solutions to improve the situation differ from Hogg and Kasky's, but he has called for a debate with them to find "common middle ground". Kashuv has also said he felt frustrated that he was not invited to speak at the March for Our Lives event, suggesting it was because of his political views. Kashuv has described himself as speaking "calmly and logically" in contrast to "inflammatory language" used by other student activists. Kashuv believed that the "initial movement, in its purest form" coming out of the Stoneman Douglas High School shooting "was amazing". He said that "It got corrupted because now it's represented as anti-gun and anti-NRA." He described March for Our Lives as being "anti-Republican" and said that the NRA does not have as much "evil power" over politicians as their critics believe. Kashuv himself was criticized by the students in Never Again MSD for his views on gun rights.

=== Criticism by Kurt Eichenwald ===
In late March 2018, Kashuv was criticized online by Newsweek writer Kurt Eichenwald. In response, Kashuv called for a boycott of MSNBC, since Eichenwald had stated that he was an MSNBC contributor on his Twitter biography, although Eichenwald had actually not been an MSNBC contributor since a month prior. One of MSNBC's sponsors, Proactiv, removed its advertisements from the network in response.

Eichenwald apologized to Kashuv, claiming that his criticism of Kashuv was a case of mistaken identity because he had taken Kashuv to be another teenager who had frequently insulted him before. Kashuv accepted Eichenwald's apology.

In April 2018, Shapiro published emails Eichenwald sent to him which included a statement that Kashuv was "in desperate need of psychiatric help". In those emails, Eichenwald stated that he was a contributing editor at Vanity Fair, but Vanity Fair issued a statement saying that Eichenwald was not a contributor at the time.

== Personal life ==
Kashuv's parents emigrated to the United States from Israel in the 1990s before he was born. He grew up in Parkland, Florida. Kashuv considers himself to be politically conservative. He and his parents are Jewish. In 2019, he said he pays weekly visits to the synagogue.

In April 2018, a student at Lincoln Southeast High School in Lincoln, Nebraska, who admired Kashuv for expressing views about gun rights contrary to so many of his classmates, asked Kashuv to her prom. Kashuv turned her down until she received more than 5,000 re-tweets of her posting with the help of Shapiro. Kashuv did not have a tuxedo or airplane fare to get to Nebraska, so she set up a GoFundMe account, which raised the necessary money in two hours. Kashuv accompanied her to her prom, and met with Nebraska governor Pete Ricketts.

== Controversy ==
Several of Kashuv's classmates complained on social media and to the press regarding Kashuv's alleged use of inflammatory and racist comments, including racial slurs against African-Americans. Kashuv was accused by his classmates of hypocrisy when he criticized Bill Nye for using vulgarities in a skit regarding climate change on Last Week Tonight with John Oliver (Nye had declared: "The planet's on fucking fire!"), stating that Nye "looked like a joke".

Screenshots of a Google Doc for a class study guide showed Kashuv writing the n-word multiple times, discussing "JEWISH SLAVES", and declaring that he would "fucking make a CSOG [sic] map of Douglas and practice" (in a supposed reference to the Counter-Strike: Global Offensive shooter game and Stoneman Douglas High School). Text messages also reportedly showed Kashuv rating a female student "7/10" and stating that she "goes for niggerjocks".

On May 22, 2019, Kashuv released a statement about the screenshots and the comments within, admitting to writing the comments when he was 16 years old before the mass shooting occurred. Kashuv called his comments "offensive", "idiotic" and "inflammatory" and that the mass shooting changed him as a person. In an interview with The New York Times, Kashuv said that the comments on the Google Doc were made late at night, and that he had "said a bunch of anti-Semitic stuff". On June 17, 2019, Kashuv stated that the comments were made "months before the shooting", and also said that Harvard University had rescinded its offer of admission as a result of the remarks. Kashuv published a letter by Harvard, which stated that they had considered "the qualities of maturity and moral character" in their decision. Kashuv has accused unidentified political opponents of having urged Harvard not to accept him.

Kashuv has said he would have to reapply to other colleges because it was too late to accept other offers. He had originally intended to take a gap year before matriculating into Harvard.

== See also ==
- JT Lewis – brother of Sandy Hook Elementary School victim who also became a conservative activist
