= 2000 Simpsonwood CDC conference =

Vaccine conference in Georgia, United States

The 2000 Simpsonwood CDC conference (officially titled Scientific Review of Vaccine Safety Datalink Information) was a two-day meeting convened in June 2000 by the Centers for Disease Control and Prevention (CDC), held at the Simpsonwood Methodist retreat and conference center in Gwinnett County near Norcross, Georgia. The key event at the conference was the presentation of data from the Vaccine Safety Datalink examining the possibility of a link between the mercury compound thimerosol in vaccines and neurological problems in children who had received those vaccines.

A 2005 article by Robert F. Kennedy, Jr., published by Rolling Stone and Salon.com, focused on the Simpsonwood meeting as part of a conspiracy to withhold or falsify vaccine-safety information. However, Kennedy's article contained numerous major factual errors and, after a number of corrections, was ultimately retracted by Salon.com. Nonetheless, on the basis of Kennedy's claims, the conference gained notoriety in the anti-vaccination movement.

== The conference ==
The conference was convened following a resolution by the Congress of the United States in 1997 requiring the Food and Drug Administration (FDA) to review the thimerosal content of approved drugs and biologics. Three vaccines of primary interest were discussed: hepatitis B vaccine, DPT vaccine, and the Hib vaccine.

Attendees included experts in the fields of autism, pediatrics, toxicology, epidemiology and vaccines. Also in attendance were approximately half a dozen public-health organisations and pharmaceutical companies, as well as eleven consultants to the CDC, a rapporteur, and a statistician. The meeting served as a prelude to vaccine policy meetings held by the Advisory Committee on Immunization Practices (ACIP), which sets U.S. vaccine policy for the CDC. The session was also to serve as the initial meeting of the ACIP work group on thimerosal and immunization.

Presentations and supporting documents from the conference were subject to a news embargo until June 21, 2000, at which point they were published by the ACIP. After the conference, researchers carried out a planned second phase to further analyze and clarify the study's preliminary findings. The results of this second analysis were published in 2003.

== In the anti-vaccination movement ==
The June 20, 2005, issue of Rolling Stone contained an article written by Robert F. Kennedy, Jr., entitled "Deadly Immunity". The article, which was also published on Salon.com, focused on the Simpsonwood conference, and alleged that government and private industry had colluded to "thwart the Freedom of Information Act" and "withhold" vaccine-safety findings from the public. Kennedy said that the Simpsonwood data linked thimerosal in vaccines to the rise in autism, but that the lead researcher later "reworked his data to bury the link between thimerosal and autism." However, Kennedy's article contained numerous errors, including overstating the amount of ethylmercury in vaccines, wrongly claiming that a researcher held a patent on one of the discussed vaccines, and erroneously claiming that the rotavirus vaccine contained thimerosal.

Salon.com later said that the errors in the article "went far in undermining Kennedy’s exposé", and corrected it on five occasions. The publisher later retracted it in January 2011, stating that criticisms of the article and flaws in the science connecting autism and vaccines undermined its value.

By the time the final study results discussed at Simpsonwood were published in 2003, the lead researcher, Thomas Verstraeten, had gone to work for GlaxoSmithKline. Kennedy contended that the delay in publication gave Verstraeten sufficient time to fix the data around the CDC's alleged objective of obscuring a link between thimerosal and autism. Verstraeten denied the allegations, and published an account of the matter in the journal Pediatrics.

In September 2007, the U.S. Senate Committee on Health, Education, Labor and Pensions rejected allegations of impropriety against Verstraeten and the CDC. Addressing Kennedy's statements, the Committee found that: "Instead of hiding the [Simpsonwood] data or restricting access to it, CDC distributed it, often to individuals who had never seen it before, and solicited outside opinion regarding how to interpret it. The transcript of these discussions was made available to the public."

== See also ==
- Thiomersal and vaccines
