= VG Kulkarni =

Hong Kong journalist

Virupax Ganesh Kulkarni
- Born: 22 September 1937; India
- Died: 10 October 2014 (aged 77); Foreign Correspondents' Club, Hong Kong
- Spouse: Suzanne Pepper (m. 1970)

Virupax Ganesh "VG" Kulkarni (22 September 1937–10 October 2014) was a Hong Kong–based journalist and Regional Editor of the Far Eastern Economic Review.

== Early life and personal life ==
Kulkarni was born in India in 1937 to a noted Brahmin family and served in the Indian Army, rising to major before being sent to serve in Hong Kong at the Indian consulate there. Kulkarni pursued Chinese studies in Hong Kong, meeting fellow student American Suzanne Pepper there in the 1960s. After marrying on 19 June 1970, he left Hong Kong with Pepper for New York where he was employed by United Press International after graduating in journalism at Columbia University's School of Journalism. The Kulkarnis returned to Hong Kong in 1973. Their apartment was situated on Bonham Road directly opposite the University of Hong Kong. The couple relocated to North Point after their apartment structure underwent redevelopment.

== Career in Hong Kong ==
Kulkarni began his Hong Kong career at the Hong Kong Standard newspaper. He later joined the Manila-based Press Foundation of Asia. He then began a long career at the Far Eastern Economic Review where, having begun as Singapore correspondent in the 1980s, he rose to regional editor. He wrote extensively on China and the region and, apart from the Review, his reports appeared in Asia Asset Management, India's Outlook journal, and the Christian Science Monitor. In 1981, he was a Depthnews senior editor. Kulkarni was an assistant regional editor at FEER in 1982 and a news editor in 1999.

James Fu, who served as Singaporean prime minister Lee Kuan Yew's press secretary, penned a letter to the Far Eastern Economic Review in 1987, warning the newspaper not to take a position in any domestic dispute. Calling as "ill-advised" Kulkarni's article discussing Malaya's role in the context of Singapore, Fu wrote that "if his articles had heightened inter-racial tensions, we would have dealt with Kulkarni, freedom of the press notwithstanding".

Kulkarni was a key figure in the Hong Kong Security Studies Group of the Foreign Correspondents' Club, formed from local scholars and diplomats. Kulkarni died in 2014 in Hong Kong at the Foreign Correspondents' Club while using the Health Club sauna. The club named a room—the V.G. Kulkarni Workroom—there for him.
