= Suzanne Pepper =

American political scientist (1939–2022)

- Born: 1939
- Died: June 29, 2022 (aged 82–83)
- Citizenship: American
- Education: University of California, Berkeley (PhD)
- Occupations: Political scientist, journalist

Suzanne Pepper (1939 – 29 June 2022) was a Hong Kong–based American political scientist and journalist. She was editor of the Chinese University of Hong Kong's China Review from 1995 to 1996.

== Biography ==
Pepper left the United States for Hong Kong in the 1960s to continue Chinese language studies that she had begun at the University of California at Berkeley. There she met fellow languages student VG Kulkarni, an Indian Army officer posted to India's consulate in Hong Kong. After several years in New York where they married in 1970, they returned to Hong Kong in 1973.

Pepper earned a PhD in political science from University of California at Berkeley in 1972. She authored a number of political science works focusing on China in general, and Hong Kong in particular. She was also a founding contributor to Hong Kong Free Press.

Pepper kept a blog, Hong Kong Focus, which is now maintained by Hong Kong Free Press.

Pepper was an honorary fellow of the Chinese University of Hong Kong, and an honorary lifetime member of the Foreign Correspondents Club of Hong Kong.

Pepper died on 29 June 2022 in Hong Kong, following a short illness.

== Publications ==
- Pepper, Suzanne (1984). China's Universities: Post-Mao Enrollment Policies and Their Impact on the Structure of Secondary Education: a Research Report. Centre for Chinese Studies, University of Michigan. ISBN 9780892640461.
- Pepper, Suzanne (1988). "China's Special Economic Zones: The Current Rescue Bid for a Faltering Experiment". Bulletin of Concerned Asian Scholars. Universities Field Staff International. doi:10.1080/14672715.1988.10412571.
- Pepper, Suzanne (1990). China's Education Reform in the 1980s: policies, issues, and historical perspectives. University of California Press. ISBN 1557290202.
- Eastman, Lloyd E; Ch'en, Jerome; Pepper, Suzanne; Slyke, Lyman P (1991). The Nationalist Era in China 1927-1949. Cambridge University Press. ISBN 9780521385916.
- Pepper, Suzanne (1999). Civil War in China: The Political Struggle 1945-1949. Rowman & Littlefield Publishers. ISBN 9780742573659.
- Pepper, Suzanne (2000). Radicalism and Education Reform in 20th-Century China: The Search for an Ideal Development Model. Cambridge University Press. ISBN 9780521778602.
- Pepper, Suzanne (2008). Keeping Democracy at Bay: Hong Kong and the Challenge of Chinese Political Reform. Rowman & Littlefield Publishers. ISBN 9780742508774.
