= Independent Journal Review =

American news and opinion website based in Alexandria, Virginia

- Company type: Private
- Website type: News aggregation, blogging, journalism
- Available in: English
- Founded: 2012; 14 years ago
- Headquarters: Alexandria, Virginia, U.S.
- Owner: Media Group of America
- Founder: Alex Skatell
- Key people: Alex Skatell
- Industry: News
- Website: ijr.com
- Advertising: Yes
- Launched: 2012
- Current status: Active

The Independent Journal Review (IJR, stylized as IJR.) is a conservative American news and opinion website based in Alexandria, Virginia. The publication was founded in 2012 by Alex Skatell. Skatell serves as its CEO, with Camden Stuebe as President and Shushanna Walshe, former political director at ABC News as the Editor-At-Large. The site covers general interest topics from a conservative point of view, including politics, culture, entertainment, and viral news content.

== History ==
=== Founding and early expansion ===
In 2012, Alex Skatell, a former digital director of the National Republican Senatorial Committee, launched the Independent Journal Review, using $40,000 that Skatell had earned via a software application that he developed at college and $20,000 borrowed from his parents. He believed that there was a gap in the market for a publication that would appeal to "a more mainstream center-right audience" and began aggregating news stories on a Facebook page called Conservative Daily. Skatell promoted the page and later launched the Independent Journal Review.

Skatell then teamed up with Phil Musser, a former executive director of the Republican Governors Association, to launch IMGE and Media Group of America. Atkinson then hired a staff of writers and editors to contribute to and grow the journal. In 2012, Skatell hired Bert Atkinson as chief editor. By November 2014, the organization employed over 62 staff across Media Group of America.

The site attracted an audience that largely lived outside Washington D.C. political circles that had broader interests than average consumers of political news.

In March 2015, the site was named "Best New Publisher of the Year" by Digiday.

In June 2015, IJR hired Benny Johnson as a "creative director" from National Review. Johnson had previously worked at BuzzFeed, being fired after plagiarizing content from other websites.

=== 2016 election cycle ===
During the 2015 campaign season, a number of Independent Journal Review political videos acquired national attention, such as Lindsey Graham destroying his cell phone and Ted Cruz making "machine gun bacon."

Then, Independent Journal Review partnered with ABC News to host the Republican Presidential Debate on February 6, 2016.

During the 2016 election, Independent Journal Review was listed in the top 10 websites engaged per news story on Facebook. In November 2016, Independent Journal Review became one of the first two digital media companies accepted into the News Media Alliance, formerly the Newspaper Association of America.

=== Post-2016 election ===
In January 2017, the website was noted for being the first major U.S. news outlet to confirm that Judge Neil Gorsuch would be nominated by president Donald Trump for the Supreme Court, news which failed to spread quickly due to other media outlets' distrust of the Review.

During United States Secretary of State Rex Tillerson's diplomatic trip to Asia in March 2017, the Independent Journal Review was the only news publication invited to send a reporter to accompany the trip.

Several key members of the Independent Journal Review's editorial staff, including Benny Johnson and Kyle Becker, were suspended in March 2017 over an opinion piece on former President Barack Obama's visit to Hawaii prior to a judge's ruling on the travel ban. Becker later resigned from IJR, and Johnson was fired from Independent Journal Review in October 2017.

In May 2017, Haley Byrd, a congressional reporter for the Independent Journal Review, said she was kicked out of the Speaker's Lobby in the U.S. Capitol because she was wearing a sleeveless dress; Byrd says she was told that she was violating the rules.

In July 2017, IMGE CEO Phil Musser purchased IMGE and formally split the agency out of Media Group of America. A few months later, in September 2017, Musser was named Senior Vice President of Communications at Boeing and left IMGE to a new leadership group. In mid-2017, IJR launched conservative and liberal verticals, IJR Red and IJR Blue to transparently present a variety of perspectives around conversations across the United States.

As of November 2017, IJR was the most conservative launch partner of the over 75 media publications, including The Washington Post, The Economist, Mic, and The Globe and Mail to participate in The Trust Project.

In 2018, IJR laid off 15 employees following a drop in traffic and changes to the Facebook algorithm, which started downplaying the publication's news stories in users’ feeds.

As of 2025, Madison Summers is editor-in-chief of IJR. Summers has been with the publication since 2018.
