= Joan Walsh =

American journalist

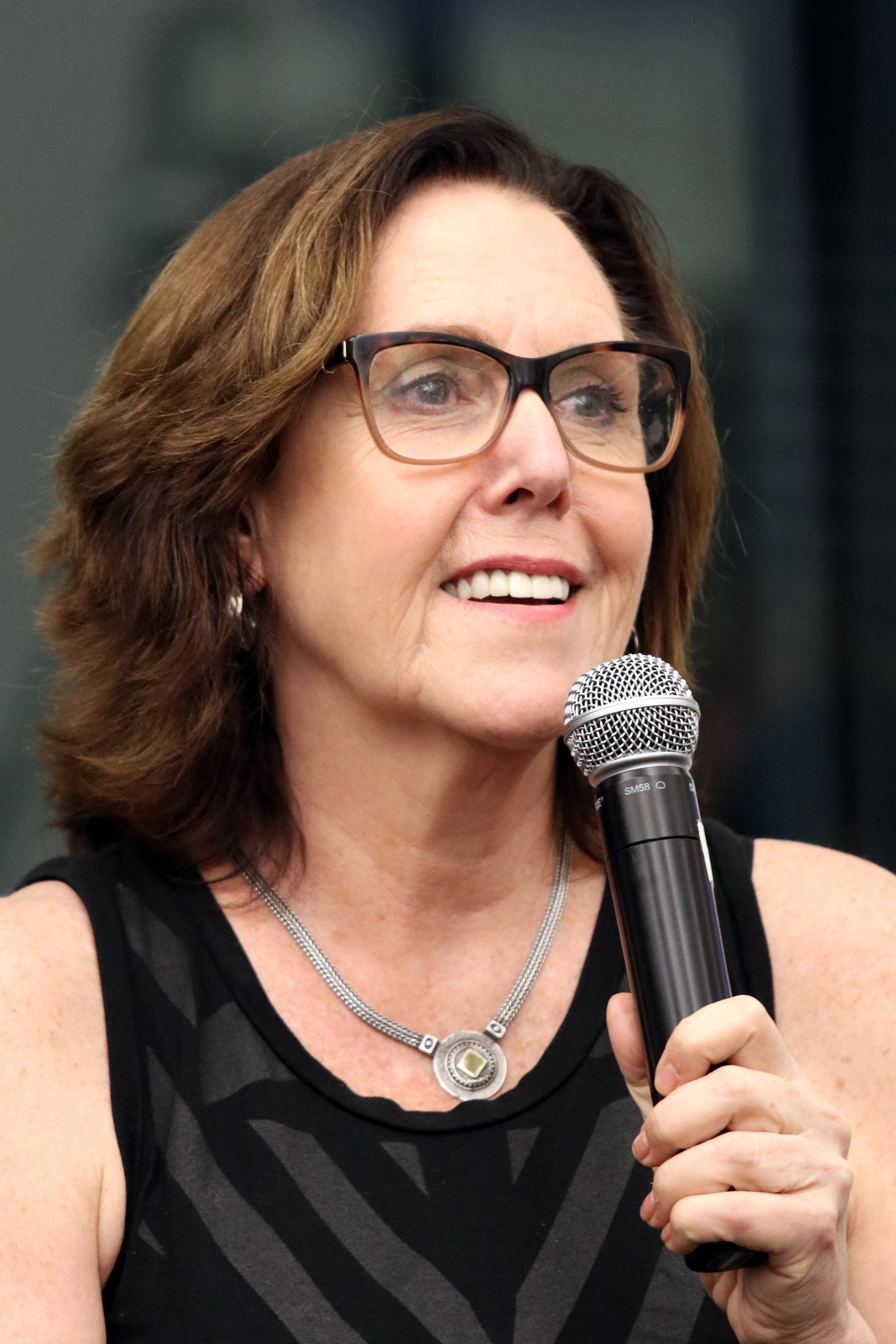
- Walsh at Social Media Weekend 2018
- Born: September 18, 1958 (age 68); Brooklyn, New York, U.S.
- Education: University of Wisconsin (BA)
- Occupation: Journalist
- Children: 1

Joan Maureen Walsh (born September 18, 1958) is a liberal American political pundit and journalist. Walsh is national affairs correspondent for The Nation, and was previously an on-air political analyst at CNN and MSNBC. She produced the 2020 documentary The Sit In: Harry Belafonte Hosts The Tonight Show. She is a former editor-in-chief of Salon and author of the book What's the Matter with White People?

== Early life and education ==
Walsh was born in Brooklyn, New York to an Irish Catholic family. In 1960, her family moved to Oceanside, Long Island. She has one brother and one sister. At the age of 13, her family moved to a northern suburb of Milwaukee where she attended high school and was editor of the school's newspaper. Her mother died when she was 17.

Walsh is a graduate of the University of Wisconsin, where she was the Campus Editor for The Daily Cardinal.

== Media career ==
=== Print media ===
After graduating from college, she joined a liberal weekly paper in California, the Santa Barbara News and Review, where she went on to become editor-in-chief.

When the online magazine Salon launched in 1998, Walsh became its first news editor. She was editor-in-chief from 2005 to 2010. In 2015, she left Salon for The Nation, and would become the publication's national affairs correspondent.

=== TV career ===
Walsh worked at MSNBC for a total of twelve years, six of them under contract. On December 23, 2017, Walsh said MSNBC had chosen not to renew her contract, which the network described as a decision made because of an annual review. In their statement, MSNBC also said that "Unfortunately we couldn't renew Joan, but she and her distinct perspective will still be invited on our shows."

MSNBC's decision to not renew Walsh's contract prompted critical reactions from other MSNBC personalities, including Joy Reid and Chris Hayes. Some of Walsh's supporters also protested MSNBC's decision using the Twitter hashtag #KeepJoanWalsh.

Later that day, Walsh tweeted that she would move to CNN in 2018, which was soon confirmed by a CNN spokeswoman. While at CNN, Walsh pushed back against former Donald Trump staffer Marc Short for accusing her of being anti-religious.

It was announced on December 14, 2020, that her contract with CNN would not be renewed. Walsh stated in response:

"I'm grateful to CNN for the opportunity. Nobody is promised a decade of paid TV commentary. Arguably, nobody deserves it! I am certainly willing to contribute to my friends' shows on MSNBC and on CNN too when I'm right for the topic."

=== Social media activity ===
On April 1, 2018, Kyle Kashuv, a witness of the Stoneman Douglas High School shooting, tweeted that Walsh "liked" a tweet criticizing him. She replied, "Are you really policing who 'likes' tweets from a grieving Parkland father who lost his daughter? Good luck handling your stress, Kyle."

== Personal life ==
Walsh is divorced and has one daughter, Nora Walsh DeVries.

In 2017, she told Politico a "fun fact" about herself: "In 1977, Bruce Springsteen jumped off the stage in Madison, Wisconsin, and danced with me. I was the original Courteney Cox, and Courteney Cox doesn't even know that."

== Books ==
- (with C. W. Nevius) Splash Hit! Pacific Bell Park and the San Francisco Giants (Chronicle Books, 2001)
- What's the Matter with White People? Why We Long for a Golden Age That Never Was (Wiley, 2012)
- (with Nick Hanauer and Donald Cohen) Corporate Bullsh*t: Exposing the Lies and Half-Truths That Protect Profit, Power and Wealth In America (The New Press, 2023)
