= David Geier =

American anti-vaccine activist (born 1980)

David A. Geier
- Born: 1980 (age 45–46)
- Education: University of Maryland, Baltimore County B.A.
- Known for: Anti-vaccine activism Alternative autism treatments Autism-related pseudoscience
- Father: Mark Geier

David Geier is an American anti-vaccine activist. He is the son of fellow anti-vaccine activist Mark Geier. In 2025, he was hired by United States Secretary of Health and Human Services Robert F. Kennedy Jr. to search for evidence that federal officials had hidden information that supported the thoroughly debunked claim that vaccines cause autism. Geier previously worked with his father to promote and perform discredited alternative autism treatments and was fined in 2011 for practicing medicine without a license.

== Early life and education ==
Geier's parents were Mark Geier and Anne Geier. He grew up learning science from his father and tennis from both parents. He attended the University of Maryland, Baltimore County starting in 1998; he received a B.A. in biology, and has taken graduate courses, but does not have any graduate degrees.

== Career ==
Geier followed in his father's pseudoscientific footsteps by advocating against vaccines—particularly those containing thiomersal (a harmless preservative)—and performing and promoting quack alternative autism treatments (such as chelation therapy and Lupron shots). He was fined by the Maryland Board of Physicians for practicing medicine without a license in 2011.

In March 2025, Geier was contracted as a senior data analyst by United States Secretary of Health and Human Services Robert F. Kennedy Jr., who said Geier was going to examine CDC vaccine safety data. Geier and his father had previously accessed this data and then been barred for misrepresenting their plans. The Intelligencer reported in July 2025 that inside sources thought Geier would try to repeat a study that showed a statistically insignificant link between infant vaccines and neurodevelopmental disorders.
