= Richard Gingras =

American entrepreneur

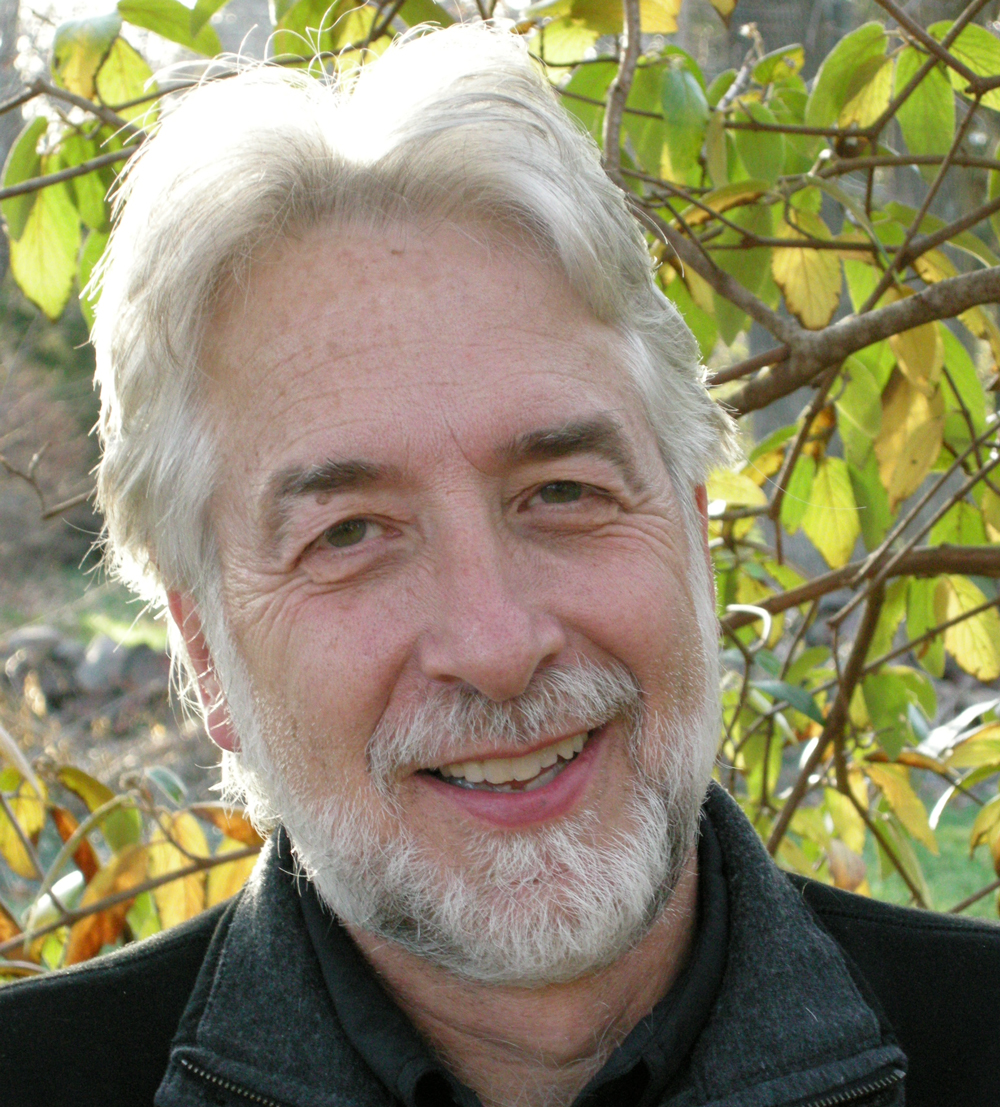
- Richard Gingras, 2011
- Born: Richard Louis Gingras; January 17, 1952 (age 74); Providence, Rhode Island, United States
- Education: Boston College
- Board member of: Village Media; First Amendment Coalition; International Center for Journalists; World Computer Exchange
- Spouse: Mitzi Trumbo
- Children: 2

Richard Gingras is an American Internet executive and entrepreneur who has focused on emerging digital media since 1979, including efforts at Google, Apple Computer, Salon Media Group and the Public Broadcasting Service. He has been an outspoken proponent for journalistic innovation on the Internet.

== Career ==
Gingras is currently chair of the board of Village Media, which operates news sites in dozens of cities in Canada and the United States. For nearly 15 years he served as the global vice president of news at Google. He has long been a voice for rethinking what it means to be a news outlet in today's digital society. He has written extensively about the subject. In May 2018 he warned against building the future of news based on a misunderstanding of the past. In his various roles at Google he has worked on how news is presented on Google search and Google News and also engaged around the world on matters of public policy effecting the open Internet.

Gingras is a founding board member of the Center for News, Technology, and Innovation, a global policy research organization looking to develop a deeper understanding of how enabling policy and enabling technology can impact the evolution of journalism in a digital society. The center's board includes former Washington Post executive editor Marty Baron and Nobel Prize winning journalist Maria Ressa.

He was a key instigator in creating the Accelerated Mobile Pages (AMP) project which is an open-source effort to improve the speed of the World Wide Web and improve advertising user experience. In late 2014, he co-founded the Trust Project with Sally Lehrman of the Markulla Center for Ethics at Santa Clara University. The Trust Project is a global effort of the journalism community to explore how the architecture of journalism can be enhanced to improve the perceived credibility of high-quality journalism.

Until July 2011, Gingras was CEO of Salon Media Group which operates the news site Salon.com and the pioneering virtual community The WELL. He has had a long association with Salon having assembled its initial seed financing in 1995. During 2007 and 2008, he served as a strategic advisor to the executive team at Google focusing on strategies relating to the evolution of news and television.

In 2002, he co-founded Goodmail Systems and served as its CEO and chairman. Goodmail Systems developed certified email services offered through large email providers including Yahoo and America Online. He also served as interim president of MyPublisher from 2000 to 2001 and guided the design of a custom hardcover photo book service introduced by Apple Computer as part of iPhoto.

From early 1996 to mid 2000, he led online service efforts at Excite@Home as Senior Vice President and General Manager of the company's consumer-focused product division, Excite Studios which included the Excite search engine.

In January 1996, he joined the early consumer broadband network @Home Network, as vice president of programming and editor-in-chief where he was responsible for the launch of @Home's broadband-enabled online portal. @Home was founded by the venture capital firm Kleiner Perkins in partnership with major US cable companies to offer high-speed Internet access. In mid 2000 @Home merged with Excite and Gingras became head of both the Excite and @Home portals.

At Apple Computer in the early 1990s he led the development of the online service eWorld. A pre-Web online service, eWorld was considered innovative for its time, but it was expensive and failed to attract a high number of subscribers. The service was only available on the Macintosh, though a PC version had been planned.

Gingras's work in interactive digital media began In 1979, when he produced one of the first interactive online news magazines which was delivered to several hundred test households using interactive television technology known as broadcast teletext. He led the effort for the PBS service (KCET in Los Angeles) which also included service components for use in schools.

From 1987 to 1992, he was the founder and president of MediaWorks, an Apple-funded startup that developed early news-agenting and executive support software for Fortune 500 corporations.

From 1983 to 1986, he assembled and managed a network of television stations in the top fifty US markets to provide sideband data distribution for a news and advertising service, Silent Radio, which was presented on electronic displays in retail locations.

== Boards and honors ==
Gingras serves on the governing or advisory boards of the International Center for Journalists, the International Consortium of Investigative Journalists, the James W Foley Legacy Foundation, the UC Berkeley School of Journalism, and the advisory council of the Frontline documentary series.

In the fall of 2012, he was recognized by Louisiana State University with the Manship Prize for contributions to the evolution of digital media. In May 2013, he gave the commencement speech at West Virginia University for the Reed School of Journalism.

In 2013, he was a subject of the digital media oral history project produced by the Joan Shorenstein Center on the Press, Politics and Public Policy at Harvard University. In the fall of 2015, he gave the commencement address at the Manship School of Communications at Louisiana State University.

In 2025 he was appointed as chair of the board of Canadian digital publisher Village Media.

== Personal life ==
In February 2003, he launched a satirical website called the Total Information Awareness Gift Shop in response to the disclosure of a secret surveillance project managed by John Poindexter within the US Defense Department. According to Gingras all revenue from sales have been contributed to the American Civil Liberties Union ACLU.

Upon giving a commencement speech at West Virginia University he was introduced as "Google's own 'burning man'." This was an apparent reference to the complex fires Gingras is known to build on the northern California coast.
