= Salon (website) =

American progressive news and opinion website

- Website type: News website
- Available in: English
- Owner: Find.co
- Creators: David Talbot; Gary Kamiya; Andrew Ross; Mignon Khargie; Scott Rosenberg; Laura Miller
- Editor: Joseph Neese (Editor in Chief)
- Key people: Mendel Benoit (CEO of Find.co); Amanda Wolfe (General Manager); Erin Keane (Chief Content Officer)
- Website: salon.com
- Commercial: Yes
- Registration: Optional
- Launched: November 20, 1995; 31 years ago
- Current status: Ceased publication November 5, 2026; 17 days ago / website active

Salon was an American politically progressive news and opinion website which ran from 1995 to 2026. It published articles on U.S. politics, culture, and current events.

On November 5, 2026, Salon announced it was ceasing publication effective that day.

== Content and coverage ==
Salon covered a variety of topics, including entertainment and culture, and food, with a particular focus on U.S. politics from a liberal and progressive point of view. Salon's web presence included a YouTube channel, where it produced the show and podcast Standing Room Only with Amanda Marcotte, among other content.

According to the senior contributing writer for the American Journalism Review, Paul Farhi, Salon offered "provocative (if predictably liberal) political commentary and lots of sex."

In 2008, Salon launched the interactive initiative Open Salon, a social content site/blog network. Originally a curated site with some of its content being featured on Salon, it fell into editorial neglect and was closed in March 2015.

Responding to the question, "How far do you go with the tabloid sensibility to get readers?," former Salon editor-in-chief David Talbot said:

Is Salon more tabloid-like? Yeah, we've made no secret of that. I've said all along that our formula here is that we're a smart tabloid. If by tabloid what you mean is you're trying to reach a popular audience, trying to write topics that are viscerally important to a readership, whether it's the story about the mother in Houston who drowned her five children or the story on the missing intern in Washington, Chandra Levy.

== Staff and contributors ==
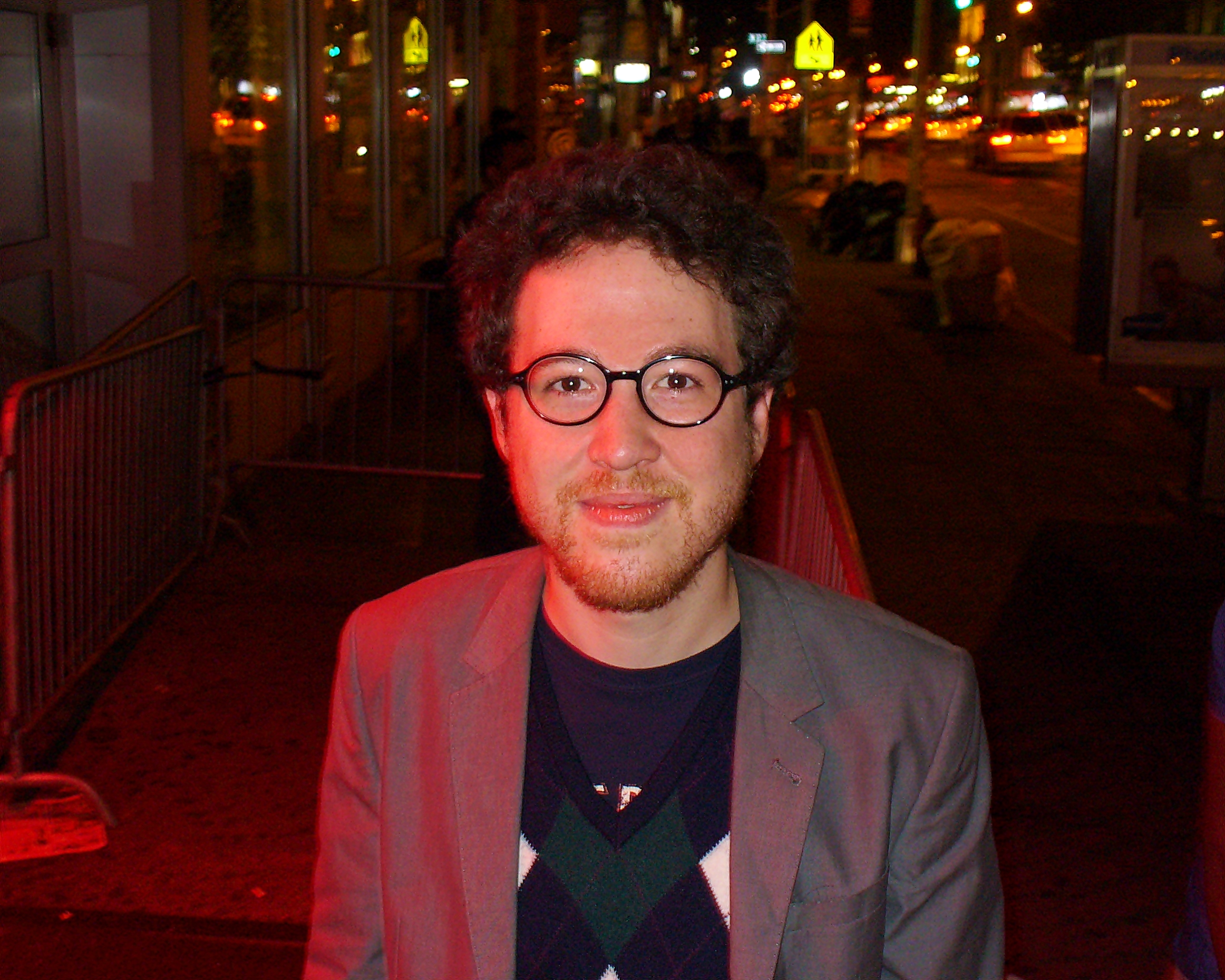
Alex Pareene, who wrote about politics for Salon, in New York in 2012

Salon.com, originally salon1999.com, was founded in 1995 by David Talbot, Gary Kamiya, Andrew Ross, Mignon Khargie, Scott Rosenberg, and Laura Miller. Talbot also served as the original editor-in-chief and several stints as CEO, the last of which saw him replace Richard Gingras, who left to join Google as head of news products in July 2011. Subsequent editors in chief are Joan Walsh (2005–2010), Kerry Lauerman (2010–2013), David Daley (2013–2016), and Jordan Hoffner (2016–2019), who was concurrently the CEO and succeeded as editor-in-chief by Erin Keane.

In 2024, Keane was Chief Content Officer, Amanda Wolfe was General Manager of Salon, and Joseph Neese was Editor In Chief.

Over the years it employed a number of well-known journalists, including Glenn Greenwald, Joan Walsh, Michelle Goldberg, Steve Kornacki, and Jake Tapper. Regular contributors have included the political opinion writers Amanda Marcotte, Scott Eric Kaufman, Heather Digby Parton and Sean Illing, critic Andrew O'Hehir and pop-culture columnist Mary Elizabeth Williams.

== History ==
2009–2012

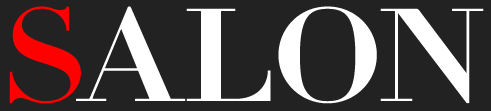
2012–2017

2017–2019

Former logos of Salon

=== 1995–2005: founding and initial success ===
Salon was created in the wake of the San Francisco newspaper strike of 1994, by former San Francisco Examiner arts and features editor David Talbot who wished to explore the potential of Web. Richard Gingras had secured $60,000 from Apple Inc.; when the funding fell through due to management changes at Apple, Adobe founder John Warnock invested $2 million. Salon launched as salon1999.com and salonmag.com in November 1995. In its early days, readers noticed a specifically Northern California flavor. In 1996, Talbot agreed: "We swim in the soup of San Francisco. There are a lot of odd fish we've plucked out of the bay here and it gives us some of that Left Coast, Weird Coast style." Time magazine named it one of the Best Web Sites of 1996.

Salon purchased the virtual community The WELL in April 1999, switched to the salon.com URL around that time, and made its initial public offering (IPO) of Salon.com on the NASDAQ stock exchange on June 22 that year. For the month of October 1999, Nielsen/NetRatings reported that Salon had over two million users. Funds from the IPO allowed Salon to pay back debt and hire aggressively.

This left Salon vulnerable to the dot-com crash and in need of funds. Salon Premium, a pay-to-view (online) content subscription was introduced on April 25, 2001. The service signed up 130,000 subscribers and temporarily staved off discontinuation of services. In November 2002, the company announced it had accumulated cash and non-cash losses of $80 million; by February 2003, it was having difficulty paying its rent and made an appeal for donations to keep the company running.

On October 9, 2003, Michael O'Donnell, the chief executive and president of Salon Media Group, said he was leaving the company after seven years because it was "time for a change". When he left, Salon.com had accrued $83.6 million in losses since its inception, and its stock traded for 5¢ on the OTC Bulletin Board. David Talbot, Salon's chairman and editor-in-chief at the time, became the new chief executive. Elizabeth "Betsy" Hambrecht, then Salon's chief financial officer, became the president.

=== 2006–2015: continued operations and Open Salon ===
Front-page design in 2006

Repeated cash injections from Warnick, now chair of the board, and from Hambrecht's father, William Hambrecht kept Salon solvent. During the nine months ending on December 31, 2012, these cash contributions amounted to $3.4 million, compared to revenue in the same period of $2.7 million.

From July 2008 to March 9, 2015, Salon hosted Open Salon, a "social content site" and "curated blog network". It was nominated for a 2009 National Magazine Award in the category "best interactive feature".

After Salon Premium subscriptions declined to 10,000, it was rebranded in 2011 as Salon Core subscriptions featuring a different mix of benefits.

Salon closed its online chat board "Table Talk" on June 10, 2011, without stating an official reason for ending that section of the site.

On July 16, 2012, Salon announced that it would be featuring content from Mondoweiss.

Salon Media Group sold The WELL to the group of members in September 2012.

=== 2016–2025: changes in ownership ===
In December 2016 and January 2017, the company was evicted from its New York offices at 132 West 31st Street, a block from Madison Square Garden, for non-payment of $90,000 in back rent. In February 2017, Spear Point Capital invested $1 million into Salon, taking a 29% equity stake and three seats on the company's board.

To increase revenue, Salon launched a beta program in 2018 preventing readers using ad blockers from seeing its content. Such users were offered a choice of disabling their blocker or allowing Salon to run an in-browser script, using the user's resources, to mine Monero, a form of cryptocurrency.

On August 30, 2019, Salon.com was sold for $5 million by Salon Media Group (Expert Market: SLNM) to privately held Salon.com, LLC, which is owned by Chris Richmond and Drew Schoentrup.

In November 2023, the site was acquired for an undisclosed sum by Find.co, an online marketing company headquartered in Malta, that describes itself as a "performance marketing ecosystem" for crypto brands.

=== Closure ===
On November 5, 2026, Salon announced it was ceasing publication effective that day, ending a 31-year run. A post attributed only to "Salon" stated the publishing model was "no longer sustainable" due to the "business realities of independent digital journalism". A spokesperson confirmed that "there are no plans to take the [online] archive down at this time".

== Retractions and corrections ==
=== Retracted article on vaccine conference ===
Salon published an article by Robert F. Kennedy Jr. called "Deadly Immunity", which appeared simultaneously in the July 14, 2005 issue of Rolling Stone. Kennedy focused on the 2000 Simpsonwood CDC conference and promoted pseudoscientific claims about vaccines and autism. Salon retracted the article on January 16, 2011, in response to criticism.

=== Otto Warmbier ===
In March 2016, while American tourist Otto Warmbier was imprisoned in North Korea for allegedly trying to steal a propaganda poster there, the site posted an article about him headed: "This might be America's biggest idiot frat boy: Meet the UVa student who thought he could pull a prank in North Korea". After Warmbier's death, the article was removed.

=== Todd Nickerson ===
In September 2015, Salon published an article written by Todd Nickerson, moderator of Virtuous Pedophiles, about his experiences with being a non-offending pedophile, titled: "I'm a pedophile, but not a monster". This caused controversy, and some commentators accused it of being "pro-pedophile" (in the sense of being pro-child sexual abuse). This article and a follow-up were deleted in early 2017. Some saw a connection between their removal and the controversy surrounding Milo Yiannopoulos's remarks on child sexual abuse that emerged in February 2017; Salon Media Group CEO and Salon acting editor-in-chief Jordan Hoffner told New York magazine that they had been removed in January 2017 due to "new editorial policies". A third article by former sex researcher Debra Soh defending Nickerson's side is still published as of May 2025.

=== Ron DeSantis headline ===
On June 23, 2021, Salon published an article with a headline falsely claiming that a bill signed by Florida Governor Ron DeSantis would force Florida students and professors to register their political views with the state of Florida. The article went viral on Twitter, and its false claim was promoted by various Democratic commentators, including Florida Commissioner of Agriculture Nikki Fried. In 2022, Salon executive editor Andrew O'Hehir said that Salon had concluded that the headline "conveyed a misleading impression of what the Florida law actually said, and did not live up to our editorial standards" and was changed. DeSantis spokesperson Christina Pushaw said that her colleagues had tried unsuccessfully to get Salon to change the headline in 2021, adding: "It's good to see that Salon finally changed its false headline after the pushback they received yesterday. It should have happened much sooner. Better yet, the Salon reporter and editors should have read the legislation before writing an article about it (a good practice for journalism, in general!)."

== Salon Book Awards ==
From 1996 to 2011, the publication issued the annual Salon Book Awards, an editorial feature highlighting the year's best fiction and nonfiction. Managed primarily by co-founder and literary editor Laura Miller, the awards functioned as an editorial year-end "best-of" list, instead of a formal juried prize. Recipients included David Foster Wallace, who won the inaugural fiction award in 1996 for Infinite Jest and again in 2011 for his posthumous novel The Pale King. Other authors included Mark Bowden for Black Hawk Down in 1999, Jeffrey Eugenides for The Marriage Plot and James Gleick for The Information: A History, a Theory, a Flood both in 2011.

== See also ==
- Slate, a similar online magazine
