= Mark Geier =

De-licensed American physician (1948–2025) stripped of his medical license

- Born: May 3, 1948; Washington, D.C., U.S.
- Died: March 20, 2025 (aged 76); Jupiter, Florida, U.S.
- Citizenship: American
- Education: George Washington University
- Spouse: Anne E. Geier (1970–2014)
- Children: David Geier
- Scientific career
- Thesis: The effect of prokaryotic genes in eukaryotes (1973)

Mark Robin Geier (1948 – March 20, 2025) was an American de-licensed physician and controversial professional witness who testified in more than 90 cases regarding allegations of injury or illness caused by vaccines. By 2013, Geier's medical license had been suspended or revoked in every state in which he was licensed over concerns about his autism treatments and his misrepresentation of his credentials to the Maryland Board of Health, to which he falsely claimed to be a board-certified geneticist and epidemiologist.

He and his son David Geier are frequently cited by proponents of the discredited claim that vaccines cause autism. Geier's credibility as an expert witness has been questioned in 10 court cases. In 2003, a judge ruled that Geier presented himself as an expert witness in "areas for which he has no training, expertise and experience". In other cases in which Geier has testified, judges have labeled his testimony "intellectually dishonest", "not reliable" and "wholly unqualified". Another judge wrote that Geier "may be clever, but he is not credible".

Geier's scientific work has also been criticized; when the Institute of Medicine reviewed vaccine safety in 2004, it dismissed Geier's work as seriously flawed, "uninterpretable", and marred by incorrect use of scientific terms. In 2003, the American Academy of Pediatrics criticized one of Geier's studies, which claimed a link between vaccines and autism, as containing "numerous conceptual and scientific flaws, omissions of fact, inaccuracies, and misstatements". In January 2007, a paper by the Geiers was retracted by the journal Autoimmunity Reviews. New Scientist reported that the supposed institutional review board (IRB) that Geier claimed approved his experiments with autistic children was located at Geier's business address and included Geier, his son David and wife, a business partner of Geier's, and a plaintiff's lawyer involved in vaccine litigation. The Maryland State Board of Physicians referred to it as a "sham IRB" that did not meet the requirements of state or federal law.

== Career ==
Geier worked at the Laboratory of General and Comparative Biochemistry, National Institutes of Health in the 1970s and 1980s as a student researcher (1969–1970), research geneticist (1971–1973), staff fellow (1973–1974), on the professional staff (1974–1978), and as a guest worker (1980–1982). He then examined vaccine safety issues, with scientists, scientific institutions, and judges criticizing this body of work as "tainted by faulty methodology".

At the time of his death he was a self-employed geneticist and, along with his son David, he operated several organizations from his private address in Maryland, including the Institute for Chronic Illness and the Genetic Centers of America. As a professional witness he testified in more than 90 vaccine cases, in support of the view that there is a clear link between thiomersal and autism. His credibility as an expert witness was criticized during many proceedings before the Special Masters. In a 2010 decision, the presiding legal authority wrote, "In summary, I conclude that all of the Geier epidemiologic studies are not reliable, and cannot be accorded any weight."

== Controversies ==
Mark and David Geier published several speculative articles about a possible link between autism spectrum disorders and vaccines that contain thimerosal, generating some controversy. The American Academy of Pediatrics dispute the conclusion of the Geiers' paper claiming a correlation between thimerosal and autism, and criticized it for "numerous conceptual and scientific flaws, omissions of fact, inaccuracies, and misstatements".

=== Limited access to Vaccine Safety Datalink records ===
The Geiers were granted access to the Vaccine Safety Datalink records, but the National Immunization Program found that "during the first visit the researchers conducted unapproved analysis on their datasets and on the second visit attempted to carry out unapproved analyses but did not complete this attempt. This analysis, had it been completed, could have increased the risk of a confidentiality breach. Before leaving, the researchers renamed files for removal which were not allowed to be removed. Had it gone undetected, this would have constituted a breach of the rules about confidentiality."

=== Lupron ===
The Geiers developed a protocol for treating autism that uses the drug Lupron, which acts as chemical castration. Mark Geier has called Lupron "the miracle drug" and the Geiers have marketed the protocol across the U.S. The Geiers filed three U.S. patent applications on the use of Lupron in combination with chelation therapy as a treatment protocol for autism based on the hypothesis that "testosterone mercury" along with low levels of glutathione blocks the conversion of DHEA to DHEA-S and therefore raises androgens which in turn further lower glutathione levels, ultimately providing a connection between autism, mercury exposure, and hyperandrogenism, specifically precocious puberty.

According to expert pediatric endocrinologists, the Lupron protocol for autism is supported only by junk science. The reaction of mercury and testosterone which the therapy is intended to treat is actually based on a protocol used to create testosterone crystals for use in X-ray crystallography rather than a physiological process that occurs in the human body. Although Abbott Laboratories sells Lupron in the U.S. and cooperated with the Geiers in one of the patent applications, it is no longer pursuing work with them, citing the nonexistence of scientific evidence to justify further research.

When treating an autistic child, the Geiers order several dozen lab tests, costing $12,000: if at least one testosterone-related result is abnormal, the Geiers consider Lupron treatments, using 10 times the daily dose ordinarily used to treat precocious puberty. The therapy costs approximately $5,000 per month. The Geiers recommend starting treatment on children as young as possible, and say that some need treatment through adulthood.

=== Expert witness testimony ===
Geier has testified as an expert witness in Federal Court, and has been accepted as an expert witness in approximately 100 hearings for parents seeking compensation from the National Vaccine Injury Compensation Program for alleged vaccine injuries to their children. In 10 of these cases, "Dr. Geier's opinion testimony has either been excluded or accorded little or no weight based upon a determination that he was testifying beyond his expertise."

=== Medical licenses revoked ===
On April 27, 2011, the Maryland State Board of Physicians suspended Geier's medical license as an "emergency action", saying he "endangers autistic children and exploits their parents by administering to the children a treatment protocol that has a known substantial risk of serious harm and which is neither consistent with evidence-based medicine nor generally accepted in the relevant scientific community". The board ruled that Geier misdiagnosed patients, diagnosed patients without sufficient tests, and recommended risky treatments without fully explaining the risks to the parents. They also ruled that he misrepresented his credentials, including during an interview with the board. Geier's lawyer, Joseph A. Schwartz III said the basis of the complaint was a "bona fide dispute over therapy", and hoped for a fair hearing to challenge the board's accusations.

The suspension was reaffirmed in May 2011, and upheld on appeal in March 2012 after a full evidentiary hearing before the Office of Administrative Hearings in Maryland. Geier's licenses to practice medicine in the states of Washington, Virginia and California were suspended as well. In June 2012, Geier was charged with violation of the Maryland suspension by continuing to practice medicine without a license. In August 2012, Geier's license was formally revoked by the Maryland State Board of Physicians. On 5 November 2012, the Missouri Medical board and the Illinois Department of Financial and Professional Regulation revoked Geier's license, both citing action taken by the Maryland State Board of Physicians. On April 12, 2013, Geier's last medical license in the United States was revoked by the state medical board of Hawaii.

In 2011, his son David was charged by the Maryland State Board of Physicians with practicing as a licensed physician when he only has a Bachelor of Arts degree in biology, and was fined $10,000 in July 2012.

=== Lawsuit against Maryland Board of Physicians ===
On December 21, 2012, a lawsuit was filed against the Maryland State Board of Physicians by Anne Geier. The claim made in case 371761-V was that a cease and desist order filed by the Maryland State Board of Physicians against Mark Geier, for prescribing medicine to his family after his license was suspended, was posted publicly on the Board's website disclosing their private medical information. A court initially ordered the Board to pay the Geiers $2.5 million, but the judgment was overturned on appeal.

== Personal life ==
Geier and his wife Anne played doubles tennis. Their son David is also an avid tennis player. Anne died of metastatic melanoma at age 67 in 2014.

Geier died on March 20, 2025 in Jupiter, Florida.

== See also ==
- Controversies in autism
