= The Trust Project =

Consortium of news organizations

- Formation: 2017
- CEO: Sally Lehrman
- Website: https://thetrustproject.org

The Trust Project is a complex international consortium involving over 100 news organizations working towards greater transparency and accountability in the global news industry, including The Economist, The Globe and Mail, the Independent Journal Review, Mic, Italy's La Repubblica, Il Sole 24 Ore, and La Stampa. The Project was started in 2014 and launched in November 2017.

== Consortium members ==
As of 2018, the consortium includes 120 members such as The Economist, The Washington Post, Germany's Deutsche Presse-Agentur (DPA), The Globe and Mail, Hong Kong Free Press, the Independent Journal Review (IJR), Mic, Italy's La Repubblica, La Stampa, Bay Area News Group, CBC News, Heavy.com, Sky News, The Toronto Star, TEGNA, Voice of OC, Italy's Corriere della Sera and Il Sole 24 Ore, Spain's El País, Greece's Kathimerini, and Haymarket Media Group.

In 2022, there were 265 news organizations that were members.

In 2023, there were 275 organizations in 10 countries.

In 2024, El Tiempo and El Nuevo Día completed a two-year process to become certified.

By the end of 2025, the Trust Project reported over 300 certified outlets.

== Core Trust Indicators and editorial attributes ==
The consortium has created a standardized content management system (CMS), editorial guidelines, and style guide. These reflect the consortium's shared principles through policies on ethics, corrections, anonymous sourcing, and fact-checking standards. News articles use markup language, user experience (UX) as "pieces of online code to deliver improved search and news results" by providing readers with information including the author/journalist and how the story was reported. The Trust Project also looks for transparency in the reporting process, including explaining some editorial decisions for major stories, being easier for readers to contact and making other disclosures. The project does not report on outlets that did not pass or share the final score of those that did, just the process it takes to pass and the standards that must be met.

== Background ==
Early Trust Project ideas dating back to 2014 included statements of mission and ethics crafted and published by news agencies, disclosure by journalists of their background regarding level of expertise and "areas of personal interest and conflict", full disclosure of all contributors to the content of an article including researchers, editors, and lawyers, the use of citations, footnotes, and corrections with links, and disclosure of their methodology including "whom they interviewed" and "what they researched".

Sally Lehrman, a journalist and former director of Santa Clara University's journalism ethics program at the Markkula Center for Applied Ethics, is the head of the Trust Project. Lehrman created the project with initial support from Richard Gingras. In his February 2018 article, Dan Peleschuk wrote that The Trust Project officially had "been two years in the making" but was, in reality, the "culmination of many more years of professional self-reflection" on the part of Lehrman. Lehrman's interest in "accountability and public transparency" was inspired in part by the 1975 Asilomar Conference on Recombinant DNA, "when geneticists debated the potential dangers of biomedical research in an attempt to raise public awareness."

The pre-launch of the Trust Project was in April 2017 and the launch with the first group of publishers—The Economist, The Globe and Mail, the Independent Journal Review, Mic, Germany's Deutsche Presse-Agentur (DPA), Trinity Mirror, The Washington Post, Italy's La Repubblica, and La Stampa—took place in the November 2017. Mic reported that their company had been working on a similar project prior to joining the consortium.

Following its November 2017 launch, Facebook, Google and Twitter, also began to deploy the new trust indicator symbols to "help assure users of the reliability of their content and combat fabricated stories". As of 2024, Google, Facebook and Bing used The Trust Project to indicate reliable news on their platforms.

== Funding ==
The Project has received funding from Craig Newmark Philanthropies, Google, the John S. and James L. Knight Foundation, the Democracy Fund, the Markkula Foundation and Facebook. Newmark said, "As a news consumer, I want news I can trust. I want to be able to read a piece of news and know who’s behind it, where the information comes from, and the reporting values of the news organization."

== Response ==
In his 2014 article, Jeff Jarvis said that The Trust Project represented "a start" in rebuilding trust in "journalism, news, and media."

According to The Mirror Group's January to March 2018 study undertaken by Reach plc readers trust rose by 8% "after adopting Trust Project indicators". In 2018, Business Wire compared the Project's Trust Indicators to nutritional labels that consortium partners can use to "provide clarity on who and what is behind a news story so that people can easily assess whether it comes from a credible source." In the Knight Commission's 2019 report "Crisis in Democracy: Renewing Trust in America", the authors note that "[w]hile many news organizations have experimented with transparency initiatives, there are no standard best practices recognized across the industry." They recommended that U.S. news media leaders and an ongoing working group of experts from across the industry could identify and adopt common standards and best practices that promote transparency" by building on "newer efforts underway such as the Trust Project" among others.

A 2023 analysis by the Center for International Media Assistance found the Trust Project to be similar to the Journalism Trust Initiative in that they focused only on process, but that the Journalism Trust Initiative had more detailed criteria and a longer process designed to align with regulatory statutes in Europe. The report concluded that it was possible that initiatives like The Trust Project could be significant in encouraging more accurate news reporting, but that was difficult to evaluate how successful the relatively new program has been given difficulties of measuring how platform algorithms, for example, do or do not incorporate these signals of reliability.

== See also ==
- NewsGuard
