= Thiomersal and vaccines =

Vaccine controversy

Concerns about thiomersal and vaccines are commonly expressed by anti-vaccine activists. Claims relating to the safety of thiomersal, a mercury-based preservative used in vaccines, are refuted, but still subject to fearmongering, notably claims it could cause neurological disorders such as autism, leading to its removal from most vaccines in the U.S. childhood schedule. This had no effect on the rates of diagnosis of pervasive developmental defects, including autism. Extensive scientific research shows no credible evidence linking thiomersal to such conditions.

Thiomersal (or thimerosal) is a mercury compound which is used as a preservative in some vaccines. Anti-vaccination activists promoting the incorrect claim that vaccination causes autism have asserted that the mercury in thiomersal is the cause. There is no scientific evidence to support this claim. The idea that thiomersal in vaccines might have detrimental effects originated with anti-vaccination activists and was sustained by them and especially through the action of plaintiffs' lawyers.

The potential impact of thiomersal on autism has been investigated extensively. Multiple lines of scientific evidence have shown that thiomersal does not cause autism. For example, the clinical symptoms of mercury poisoning differ significantly from those of autism. In addition, multiple population studies have found no association between thiomersal and autism, and rates of autism have continued to increase despite removal of thiomersal from vaccines. Thus, major scientific and medical bodies such as the Institute of Medicine and World Health Organization (WHO) as well as governmental agencies such as the Food and Drug Administration (FDA) and the Centers for Disease Control and Prevention (CDC) reject any role for thiomersal in autism or other neurodevelopmental disorders. In spite of the consensus of the scientific community, some parents and advocacy groups continue to contend that thiomersal is linked to autism and the claim is still stated as if it were fact in anti-vaccination propaganda, notably that of Robert F. Kennedy Jr., through his group Children's Health Defense. Thiomersal is no longer used in most children's vaccines in the United States, with the exception of some types of flu shots. While exposure to mercury may result in damage to brain, kidneys, and developing fetus, the scientific consensus is that thiomersal has no such effects. Nevertheless, the CDC under Robert F. Kennedy Jr. has in June 2025 restricted its use in even the influenza vaccines.

This controversy has caused harm due to parents attempting to treat their autistic children with unproven and possibly dangerous treatments, discouraging parents from vaccinating their children due to fears about thiomersal toxicity and diverting resources away from research into more promising areas for the cause of autism. Thousands of lawsuits have been filed in the U.S. to seek damages from alleged toxicity from vaccines, including those purportedly caused by thiomersal. U.S. courts have ruled against multiple representative test cases involving thiomersal. A 2011 journal article described the vaccine–autism connection as "perhaps, the most damaging medical hoax of the last 100 years".

== History ==
Thiomersal (synonymously thimerosal, especially in the United States) is an organomercury compound used as a preservative in vaccines to prevent bacterial and fungal contamination. Following a mandated review of mercury-containing food and drugs in 1999, the Centers for Disease Control and Prevention (CDC) and the American Academy of Pediatrics (AAP) determined that under the existing vaccination schedule "some children could be exposed to a cumulative level of mercury over the first 6 months of life that exceeds one of the federal guidelines on methyl mercury". They asked vaccine makers to remove thiomersal from vaccines as quickly as possible as a precautionary measure, and it was rapidly phased out of most U.S. and EU vaccines, but is still used in multi-dose vials of flu vaccines in the U.S. No vaccines in the European Union currently contain thiomersal as a preservative. In the context of perceived increased autism rates and increased number of vaccines in the childhood vaccination schedule, some parents believed the action to remove thiomersal was an indication that the preservative caused autism.

It was introduced as a preservative in the 1930s to prevent the growth of infectious organisms such as bacteria and fungi, and has been in use in vaccines and other products such as immunoglobulin preparations and ophthalmic and nasal solutions. Vaccine manufacturers have used preservatives to prevent microbial growth during the manufacturing process or when packaged as "multi-dose" products to allow for multiple punctures of the same vial to dispense multiple vaccinations with less fear of contamination. After the FDA Modernization Act of 1997 mandated a review and risk assessment of all mercury-containing food and drugs, vaccine manufacturers responded to FDA requests made in December 1998 and April 1999 to provide detailed information about the thiomersal content of their preparations.

A review of the data showed that while the vaccine schedule for infants did not exceed FDA, Agency for Toxic Substances and Disease Registry (ATSDR), or WHO guidelines on mercury exposure, it could have exceeded Environmental Protection Agency (EPA) standards for the first six months of life, depending on the vaccine formulation and the weight of the infant. The review also highlighted difficulty interpreting toxicity of the ethylmercury in thiomersal because guidelines for mercury toxicity were based primarily on studies of methylmercury, a different mercury compound with different toxicologic properties. Multiple meetings were scheduled among various government officials and scientists from multiple agencies to discuss the appropriate response to this evidence. There was a wide range of opinions on the urgency and significance of the safety of thiomersal, with some toxicologists suggesting there was no clear evidence that thiomersal was harmful and other participants like Neal Halsey, director of the Institute of Vaccine Safety at Johns Hopkins School of Public Health, strongly advocating removal of thiomersal from vaccines due to possible safety risks. In the process of forming the response to this information, the participants attempted to strike a balance between acknowledging possible harm from thiomersal and the risks involved if childhood vaccinations were delayed or stopped.

Upon conclusion of their review, the FDA, in conjunction with the other members of the U.S. Public Health Service (USPHS), the National Institutes of Health (NIH), CDC and Health Resources and Services Administration (HRSA), in a joint statement with the AAP in July 1999 concluded that there was "no evidence of harm caused by doses of thimerosal found in vaccines, except for local hypersensitivity reactions."

Despite the lack of convincing evidence of toxicity of thiomersal when used as a vaccine preservative, the USPHS and AAP determined that thiomersal should be removed from vaccines as a purely precautionary measure. This action was based on the precautionary principle, which assumes that there is no harm in exercising caution even if it later turns out to be unnecessary. The CDC and AAP reasoned that despite the lack of evidence of significant harm in the use of thiomersal in vaccines, the removal of this preservative would increase the public confidence in the safety of vaccines. Although thiomersal was largely removed from routine infant vaccines by summer 2001 in the U.S., some vaccines continue to contain non-trace amounts of thiomersal, mainly in multi-dose vaccines targeted against influenza, meningococcal disease and tetanus.

In 2004 Quackwatch posted an article saying that chelation therapy has been falsely promoted as effective against autism, and that practitioners falsified diagnoses of metal poisoning to "trick" parents into having their children undergo the process. As of 2008, between 2–8% of children with autism had undergone the therapy.

=== Rationale for concern ===
Reports of autism cases per 1,000 children grew dramatically in the U.S. from 1996 to 2007. It is unknown how much, if any, growth came from changes in autism's prevalence.

Although intended to increase public confidence in vaccinations, the decision to remove thiomersal instead led to some parents suspecting thiomersal as a cause of autism. This concern over a vaccine-autism link grew from a confluence of several underlying factors. First, methylmercury had for decades been the subject of widespread environmental and media concern after two highly publicized episodes of poisonings in the 1950s and 1960s in Minamata Bay, Japan from industrial waste and in the 1970s in Iraq from fungicide contamination of wheat. These incidents led to new research on methylmercury safety and culminated in the publication of an array of confusing recommendations by public health agencies in the 1990s warning against methylmercury exposure in adults and pregnant women, which ensured a continued high public awareness of mercury toxicity. Second, the vaccine schedule for infants expanded in the 1990s to include more vaccines, some of which, including the Hib vaccine, DTaP vaccine and hepatitis B vaccine, could have contained thiomersal. Third, the number of diagnoses of autism grew in the 1990s, leading parents of these children to search for an explanation for the apparent rise in diagnoses, including considering possible environmental factors. The dramatic increase in reported cases of autism during the 1990s and early 2000s is largely attributable to changes in diagnostic practices, referral patterns, availability of services, age at diagnosis, and public awareness, and it is unknown whether autism's true prevalence increased during the period. Nevertheless, some parents believed that there was a growing "autism epidemic" and connected these three factors to conclude that the increase in number of vaccines, and specifically the mercury in thiomersal in those vaccines, was causing a dramatic increase in the incidence of autism.

Advocates of a thiomersal-autism link also relied on indirect evidence from the scientific literature, including analogy with neurotoxic effects of other mercury compounds, the reported epidemiologic association between autism and vaccine use, and extrapolation from in vitro experiments and animal studies. Studies conducted by Mark Geier and his son David Geier have been the most frequently cited research by parents advocating a link between thiomersal and autism. This research by Geier has received considerable criticism for methodological problems in his research, including not presenting methods and statistical analyses to others for verification, improperly analyzing data taken from Vaccine Adverse Event Reporting System, as well as either mislabelling or confusing fundamental statistical terms in his papers, leading to results that were "uninterpretable".

=== Publicity of concern ===
Several months after the recommendation to have thiomersal removed from vaccines was published, a speculative article was published in Medical Hypotheses, a non-peer-reviewed journal, by parents who launched the parental advocacy group SafeMinds to promote the theory that thiomersal caused autism. The controversy began to gain legitimacy in the eyes of the public and gained widening support within certain elements in the autism advocacy community as well as in the political arena, with U.S. Representative Dan Burton openly supporting this movement and holding a number of Congressional hearings on the subject.

Further support for the association between autism and thiomersal appeared in an article by Robert F. Kennedy Jr. in the magazines Rolling Stone and Salon.com alleging a government conspiracy at a CDC meeting to conceal the dangers of thiomersal to protect the pharmaceutical industry, and a book written by David Kirby, Evidence of Harm, dramatizing the lives of parents of autistic children, with both authors participating in media interviews to promote their work and the controversy. Although the allegations by Kennedy were denied and a U.S. Senate committee investigation later found no evidence to substantiate the most serious allegations, the story had already been well publicized by leveraging Kennedy's celebrity. Salon magazine subsequently amended Kennedy's article five times due to factual errors and later retracted it completely on 16 January 2011, stating that the works of critics of the article and evidence of the flaws in the science connecting autism and vaccines undermined the value of the article to the editors.

Meanwhile, during this time of increased media publicity of the controversy, public health officials and institutions did little to rebut the concerns and speculative theories being offered. Media attention and polarization of the debate has also been fueled by personal injury lawyers who took out full-page ads in prominent newspapers and offered financial support for expert witnesses who dissented from the scientific consensus that there is no convincing evidence for a link between thiomersal and autism. Paul Offit, a leading vaccine researcher and advocate, has said that the media has a tendency to provide false balance by perpetually presenting both sides of an issue even when only one side is supported by the evidence and thereby giving a platform for the spread of misinformation.

Despite the consensus from experts that there is no link between thiomersal and autism, many parents continue to believe that such a link exists. These parents share the viewpoint that autism is not just treatable, but curable through "biomedical" interventions and have been frustrated by the lack of progress from more "mainline" scientists in finding this cure. Instead, they have supported an alternative community of like-minded parents, physicians and scientists who promote this belief. This mindset has taught these parents to challenge the expertise from the mainstream scientific community. Parents have also been influenced by an extensive network of anti-vaccination organizations such as Robert F. Kennedy Jr.'s Children's Health Defense and a large number of online anti-vaccination websites that present themselves as an alternative source for evidence using pseudoscientific claims. These websites use emotional appeals to gather support and frame the controversy as an adversarial dispute between parents and a conspiracy of doctors and scientists. Advocates for a thiomersal-autism link have also relied on celebrities like model Jenny McCarthy and information presented on Don Imus' Imus in the Morning radio show to persuade the public to their cause, instead of relying only on "dry" scientific papers and scientists. McCarthy has published a book describing her personal experience with her autistic son and appeared on The Oprah Winfrey Show to promote the hypothesis of vaccines causing autism. Bitterness over this issue has led to numerous threats made against the CDC as well as researchers like Offit, with increased security placed by the CDC in response to these threats.

== Scientific evaluation ==
=== Rationale for doubting link ===
Various lines of evidence undermine a proposed link between thiomersal and autism. For example, although advocates of a thiomersal-autism link consider autism a form of "mercury poisoning", the typical symptoms of mercury toxicity are significantly different from symptoms seen in autism. Likewise, the neuroanatomic and histopathologic features of the brains of patients who have mercury poisoning, both with methylmercury as well as ethylmercury, have significant differences from the brains of people with autism. Previous episodes of widespread mercury toxicity in a population such as in Minamata Bay, Japan would also be expected to lead to documentation of a significant rise in autism or autism-like behavior in children should autism be caused by mercury poisoning. However, research on several episodes of acute and chronic mercury poisoning have not documented any such rise in autism-like behavior. Although some parents cite an association between the timing of onset of autistic symptoms with the timing of vaccinations as evidence of an environmental cause such as thiomersal, this line of reasoning can be misleading. Associations such as these do not establish causation as the two occurring together may be only coincidental in nature. Also, genetic disorders that have no environmental triggers such as Rett syndrome and Huntington's disease nevertheless have specific ages when they begin to show symptoms, suggesting specific ages of onset of symptoms does not necessarily require an environmental cause.

Although the concern for a thiomersal-autism link was originally derived from indirect evidence based on the known potent neurotoxic effects of methylmercury, recent studies show these feared effects were likely overestimated. Ethylmercury, such as in thiomersal, clears much faster from the body after administration than methylmercury, suggesting total mercury exposure over time is much less with ethylmercury. Currently used methods of estimating brain deposition of mercury likely overestimates the amounts deposited due to ethylmercury, and ethylmercury also decomposes quicker in the brain than methylmercury, suggesting a lower risk of brain damage. These findings show that the assumptions that originally led to concern about the toxicity of ethylmercury, which were based on direct comparison to methylmercury, were flawed.

=== Population studies ===
Multiple studies have been performed on data from large populations of children to study the relationship between the use of vaccines containing thiomersal, and autism and other neurodevelopmental disorders. Almost all of these studies have found no association between thiomersal-containing vaccines (TCVs) and autism, and studies done after the removal of thiomersal from vaccines have nevertheless shown autism rates continuing to increase. The only epidemiologic research that has found a purported link between TCVs and autism has been conducted by Mark Geier, whose flawed research has not been given any weight by independent reviews.

In Europe, a cohort study of 467,450 Danish children found no association between TCVs and autism or autism spectrum disorders (ASDs), nor any dose-response relationship between thiomersal and ASDs that would be suggestive of toxic exposure. An ecological analysis that studied 956 Danish children diagnosed with autism likewise did not show an association between autism and thiomersal. A retrospective cohort study on 109,863 children in the United Kingdom found no association between TCVs and autism, but a possible increased risk for tics. Analysis in this study also showed a possible protective effect with respect to general developmental disorders, attention-deficit disorder, and otherwise unspecified developmental delay. Another UK study based on a prospective cohort of 13,617 children likewise found more associated benefits than risks from thiomersal exposure with respect to developmental disorders. Because the Danish and UK studies involved only diphtheria-tetanus-pertussis (DTP) or diphtheria-tetanus (DT) vaccines, they are less relevant for the higher thiomersal exposure levels that occurred in the U.S.

In North America, a Canadian study of 27,749 children in Quebec showed that thiomersal was unrelated to the increasing trend in pervasive developmental disorders (PDDs). In fact, the study noted that rates of PDDs were higher in the birth cohorts with no thiomersal when compared to those with medium or high levels of exposure. A study performed in the U.S. which analyzed data from 78,829 children enrolled in HMOs taken from the Vaccine Safety Datalink (VSD) did not show any consistent association between TCVs and neurodevelopmental outcomes, noting different results from data in different HMOs. A study performed in California found that removal of thiomersal from vaccines did not decrease the rates of autism, suggesting that thiomersal could not be the primary cause of autism. A study on children from Denmark, Sweden and California likewise argued against TCVs being causally associated with autism.

=== Scientific consensus ===
In 2001 the Centers for Disease Control and Prevention and the National Institutes of Health asked the U.S. National Academy of Sciences' (NAS) Institute of Medicine to establish an independent expert committee to review hypotheses about existing and emerging immunization safety concerns. This initial report found that based on indirect and incomplete evidence available at the time, there was inadequate evidence to accept or reject a thiomersal-autism link, though it was biologically plausible.

Since this report was released, several independent reviews have examined the body of published research for a possible thiomersal-autism link by examining the theoretical mechanisms of thiomersal causing harm and by reviewing the in vitro, animal, and population studies that have been published. These reviews determined that no evidence exists to establish thiomersal as the cause of autism or other neurodevelopmental disorders.

The scientific consensus on the subject is reflected in a follow-up report that was subsequently published in 2004 by the Institute of Medicine, which took into account new data that had been published since the 2001 report. The committee noted, in response to those who cite in vitro or animal models as evidence for the link between autism and thiomersal:

However, the experiments showing effects of thimerosal on biochemical pathways in cell culture systems and showing abnormalities in the immune system or metal metabolism in people with autism are provocative; the autism research community should consider the appropriate composition of the autism research portfolio with some of these new findings in mind. However, these experiments do not provide evidence of a relationship between vaccines or thimerosal and autism. In the absence of experimental or human evidence that vaccination (either the MMR vaccine or the preservative thimerosal) affects metabolic, developmental, immune, or other physiological or molecular mechanisms that are causally related to the development of autism, the committee concludes that the hypotheses generated to date are theoretical only.

The committee concludes:

Thus, based on this body of evidence, the committee concludes that the evidence favors rejection of a causal relationship between thimerosal-containing vaccines and autism. [bold in original]

Further evidence of the scientific consensus includes the rejection of a causal link between thiomersal and autism by multiple national and international scientific and medical bodies including the American Medical Association, the American Academy of Pediatrics, the American College of Medical Toxicology, the Canadian Paediatric Society, the U.S. National Academy of Sciences, the Food and Drug Administration, Centers for Disease Control and Prevention, the World Health Organization, the Public Health Agency of Canada, and the European Medicines Agency.

A 2011 journal article reflects this point of view and described the vaccine-autism connection as "the most damaging medical hoax of the last 100 years".

== Consequences ==
The suggestion that thiomersal has contributed to autism and other neurodevelopmental disorders has had a number of effects. Public health officials believe fear driven by advocates of a thiomersal-autism link has caused parents to avoid vaccination or adopt "made up" vaccination schedules that expose their children to increased risk from preventable diseases such as measles and pertussis. Advocates of a thiomersal-autism link have also helped enact laws in six states (California, Delaware, Illinois, Missouri, New York and Washington) between 2004 and 2006 to limit the use of thiomersal given to pregnant women and children, although later attempts in 2009 in twelve other states failed to pass. These laws can be temporarily suspended, but vaccine advocates doubt their utility given the lack of evidence for danger with thiomersal in vaccines. Vaccine advocates are also concerned that passage of such laws help fuel a backlash against vaccination and contribute to doubts about the safety of vaccines that are unwarranted.

While thiomersal was being removed from vaccines, the CDC and AAP asked doctors to delay the birth dose of hepatitis B vaccine in children not at risk for hepatitis. This decision, though following the precautionary principle, nevertheless sparked confusion, controversy and some harm. Approximately 10% of hospitals suspended the use of hepatitis B vaccine for all newborns, and one child born to a Michigan mother infected with hepatitis B virus died of it. Similarly, a study found that the number of hospitals who failed to properly vaccinate infants of hepatitis B seropositive mothers rose by over six times. This is a potential negative outcome given the high probability that infants who acquire hepatitis B infection at birth will develop the infection in a chronic form and possibly liver cancer.

The notion that thiomersal causes autism has led some parents to have their children treated with costly and potentially dangerous therapies such as chelation therapy, which is typically used to treat heavy metal poisoning, due to parental fears that autism is a form of "mercury poisoning". As many as 2 to 8% of autistic children in the U.S., numbering as many as several thousand children per year, receive mercury-chelating agents. Although critics of using chelation therapy as an autism treatment point to a lack of any evidence to support its use, hundreds of doctors prescribe these medications despite possible side effects including nutritional deficiencies as well as damage to the liver and kidney. The popularity of this therapy caused a "public health imperative" that led the U.S. National Institute of Mental Health (NIMH) to commission a study about chelation in autism by studying DMSA, a chelating agent used for lead poisoning, despite worries from critics that there would be no chance it would show positive results and it would be unlikely to convince parents to not use the therapy. Ultimately, the study was halted due to ethical concerns that there would be too much risk to children with autism who did not have toxic levels of mercury or lead due to a new animal study showing possible cognitive and emotional problems associated with DMSA. A 5-year-old autistic boy died from cardiac arrest immediately after receiving chelation therapy treatment using EDTA in 2005.

The notion has also diverted attention and resources away from efforts to determine the causes of autism. The 2004 Institute of Medicine report committee recommended that while it supported "targeted research that focuses on better understanding the disease of autism, from a public health perspective the committee does not consider a significant investment in studies of the theoretical vaccine-autism connection to be useful at this time." Alison Singer, a senior executive of Autism Speaks, resigned from the group in 2009 in a dispute over whether to fund more research on links between vaccination and autism, saying, "There isn't an unlimited pot of money, and every dollar spent looking where we know the answer isn't is one less dollar we have to spend where we might find new answers."

In June 2025, CDC under the U.S. Secretary of Health, Robert F. Kennedy Jr., restricted the use of thiomersal in the influenza vaccines.

== Court cases ==
From 1988 until August 2010, 5,632 claims relating to autism were made to Office of Special Masters of the U.S. Court of Federal Claims (commonly known as the "Vaccine Court") which oversees vaccine injury claims, of which one case has received compensation, 738 cases have been dismissed with no compensations made, and with the remaining cases pending. In the one case which received compensation, the U.S. government agreed to pay for injury to a child that had a pre-existing mitochondrial disorder who developed autism-like symptoms after multiple vaccinations, some of which included thiomersal. Citing the inability to rule out a role of these vaccinations in exacerbating her underlying mitochondrial disorder as the rationale for payment, CDC officials cautioned against generalizing this one case to all autism-related vaccine cases as most patients with autism do not have a mitochondrial disorder. In February 2009, this court also ruled on three autism-related cases, each exploring different mechanisms that plaintiffs proposed linked thiomersal-containing vaccines with autism. Three judges independently found no evidence that vaccines caused autism and denied the plaintiffs compensation. Since these same mechanisms formed the basis for the vast majority of remaining autism-related vaccine injury cases, the chance for compensation in any of these cases has significantly decreased. In March 2010, the court ruled in three other test cases that thiomersal-containing vaccines do not cause autism.

== See also ==
- Vaccine shedding
- Vaccine hesitancy
- Folk epidemiology of autism
- Lancet MMR autism fraud
