= County sheriff (Florida) =

Elective office

The county sheriff is one of the constitutional officers established by the Florida Constitution.

The sheriff has a duty to enforce both the Florida Constitution and Florida state laws and statutes, and to provide for the security, safety and well-being of its citizens. This is accomplished through the delivery of law enforcement services, the operation of the county jail, and the provision of court security. The Office of the Sheriff functions as the executive officer of the court.

Under Florida law, the sheriff derives his legal authority from the Florida constitution. The sheriff is vested with the ability to appoint and direct deputies who will act in his name and office to enforce the appropriate and applicable laws of the State of Florida. Those deputies of the county sheriff's office who are certified law enforcement officers must maintain a thorough working knowledge of the laws they enforce and the underlying principles from which they emanate.

== Duties ==
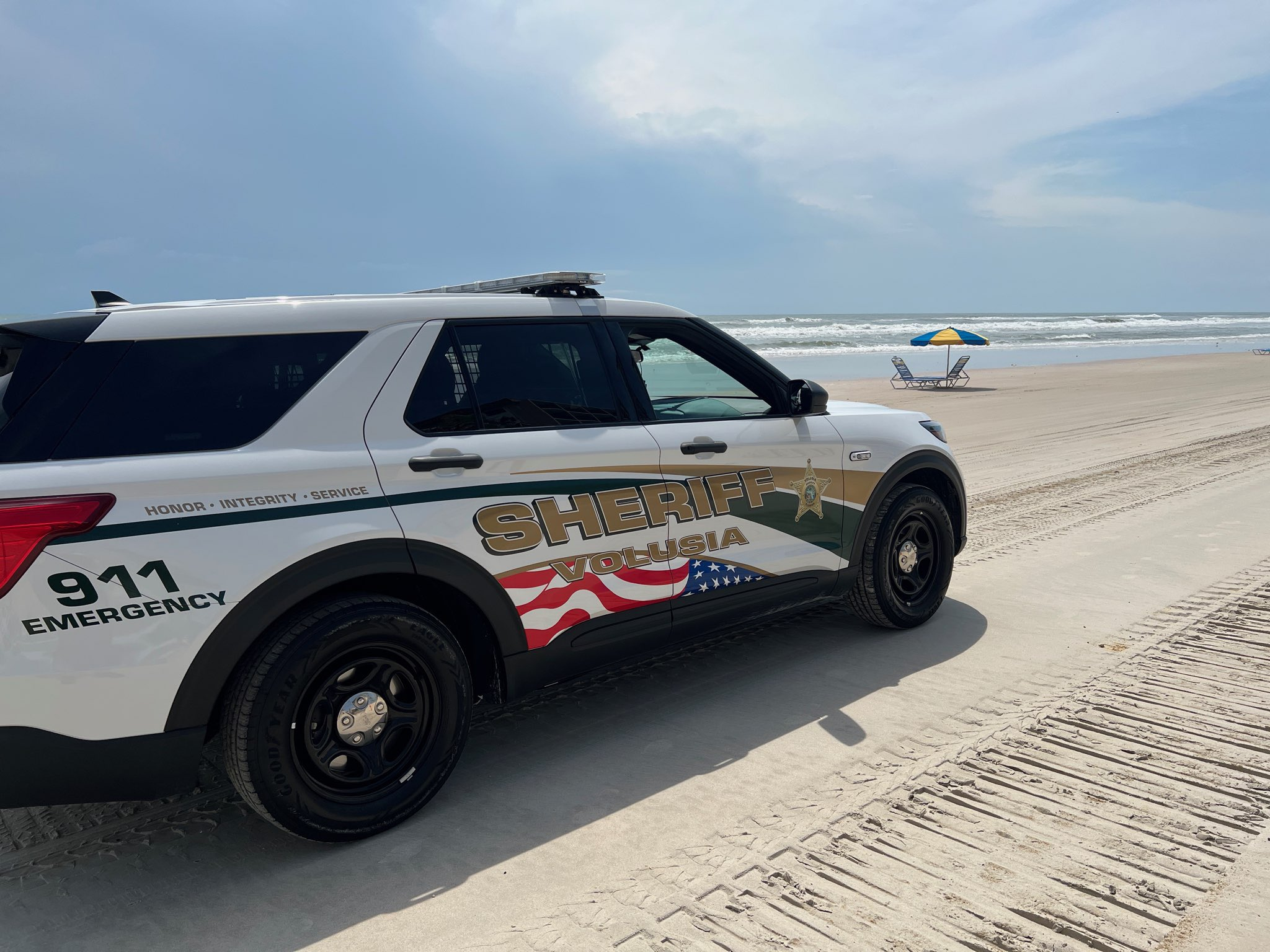
VSO patrol vehicle, New Smyrna Beach, Florida, 2023

The duties, as enumerated in Chapter 30 of the Florida Statutes, include:

- Executing all process of the Supreme Court, circuit court, county court, and board of county commissioners, to be executed in its county.
- Executing such other writs, processes, warrants, and other papers directed to it, as may come to its hands to be executed in its county.
- Attending all terms of the circuit court and county court held in its county.
- Executing all orders of the board of county commissioners of its county, for which services it shall receive such compensation, out of the county treasury, as said boards may deem proper.
- Being conservator of the peace in its county.
- Suppressing tumults, riots, and unlawful assemblies in its county with force and strong hand when necessary.
- Apprehending, without warrant, any person disturbing the peace, and carrying that person before the proper judicial officer, that further proceedings may be had against him or her according to law.
- Having authority to raise the power of the county and command any person to assist it, when necessary, in the execution of the duties of its office.
- Being, ex officio, timber agents for its county.
- Performing such other duties as may be imposed upon it by law.

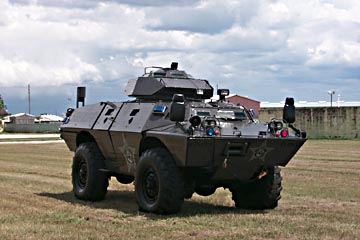
Seminole County Sheriff's Office rescue vehicle

== List of Florida sheriffs ==
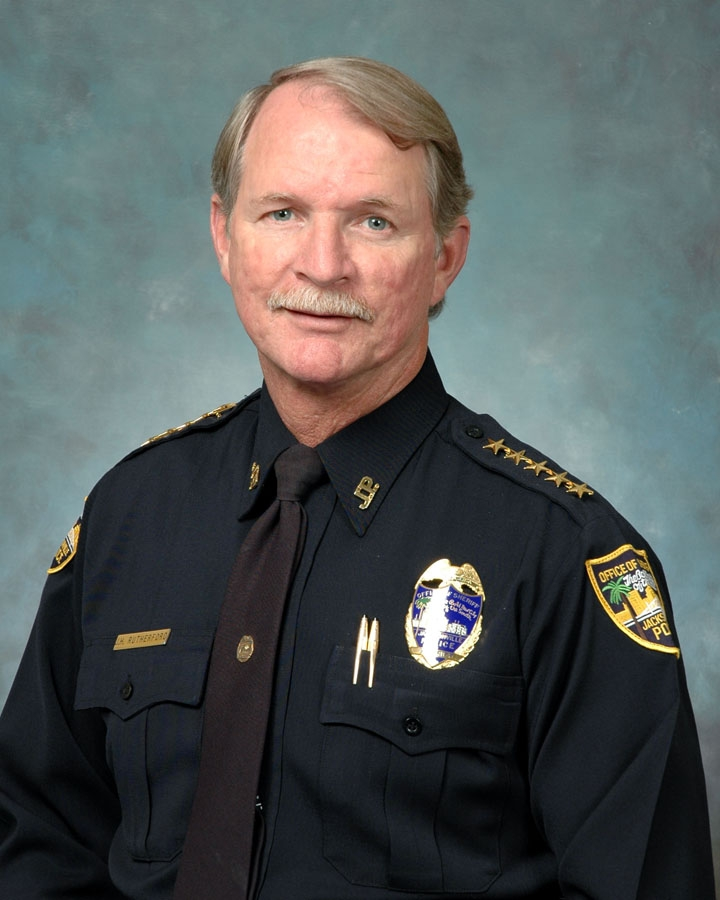
Congressman John Rutherford as then-sheriff of Jacksonville, 2007

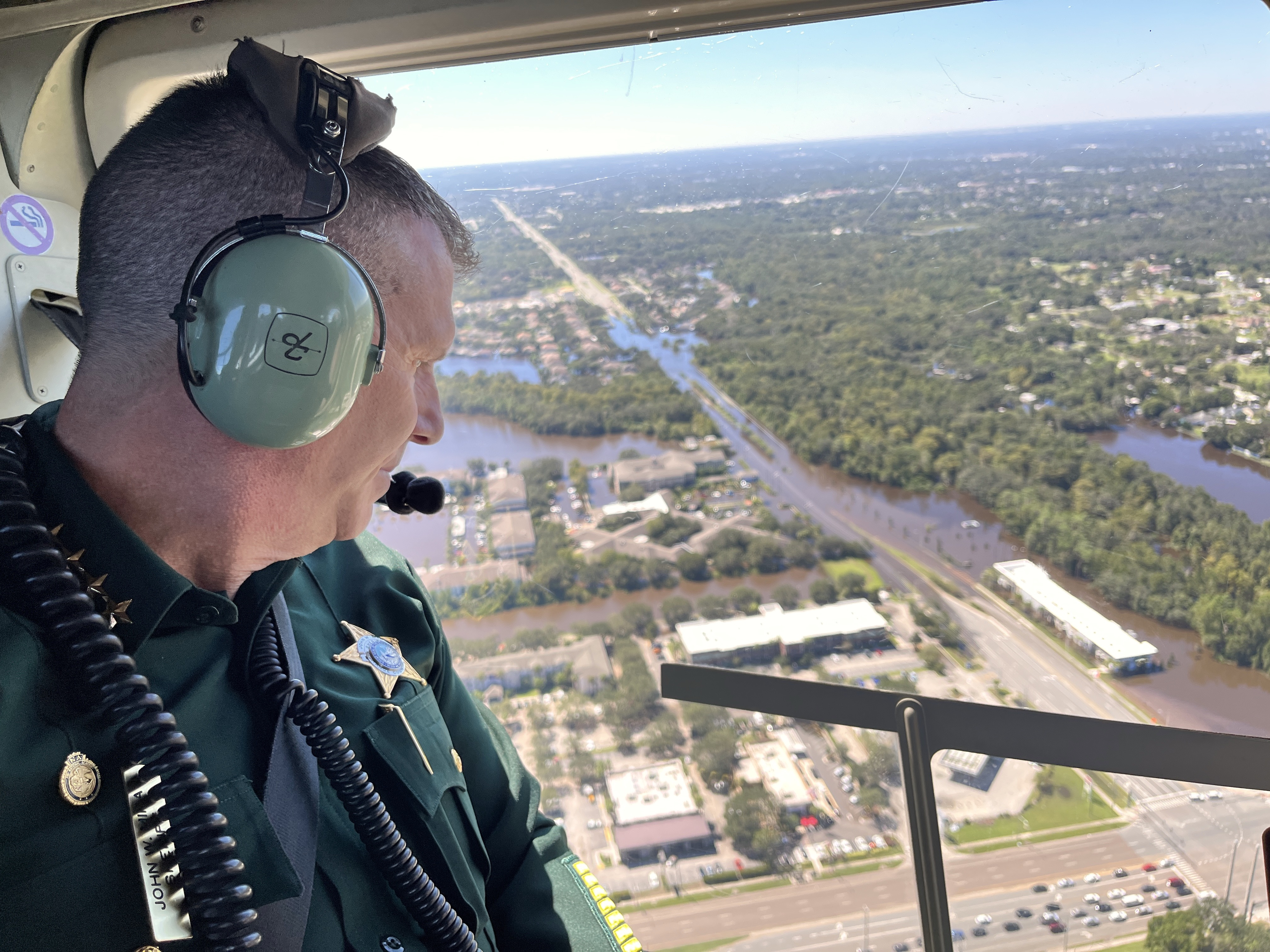
Sheriff John Mina surveying damage sustained during Hurricane Ian, September 2022

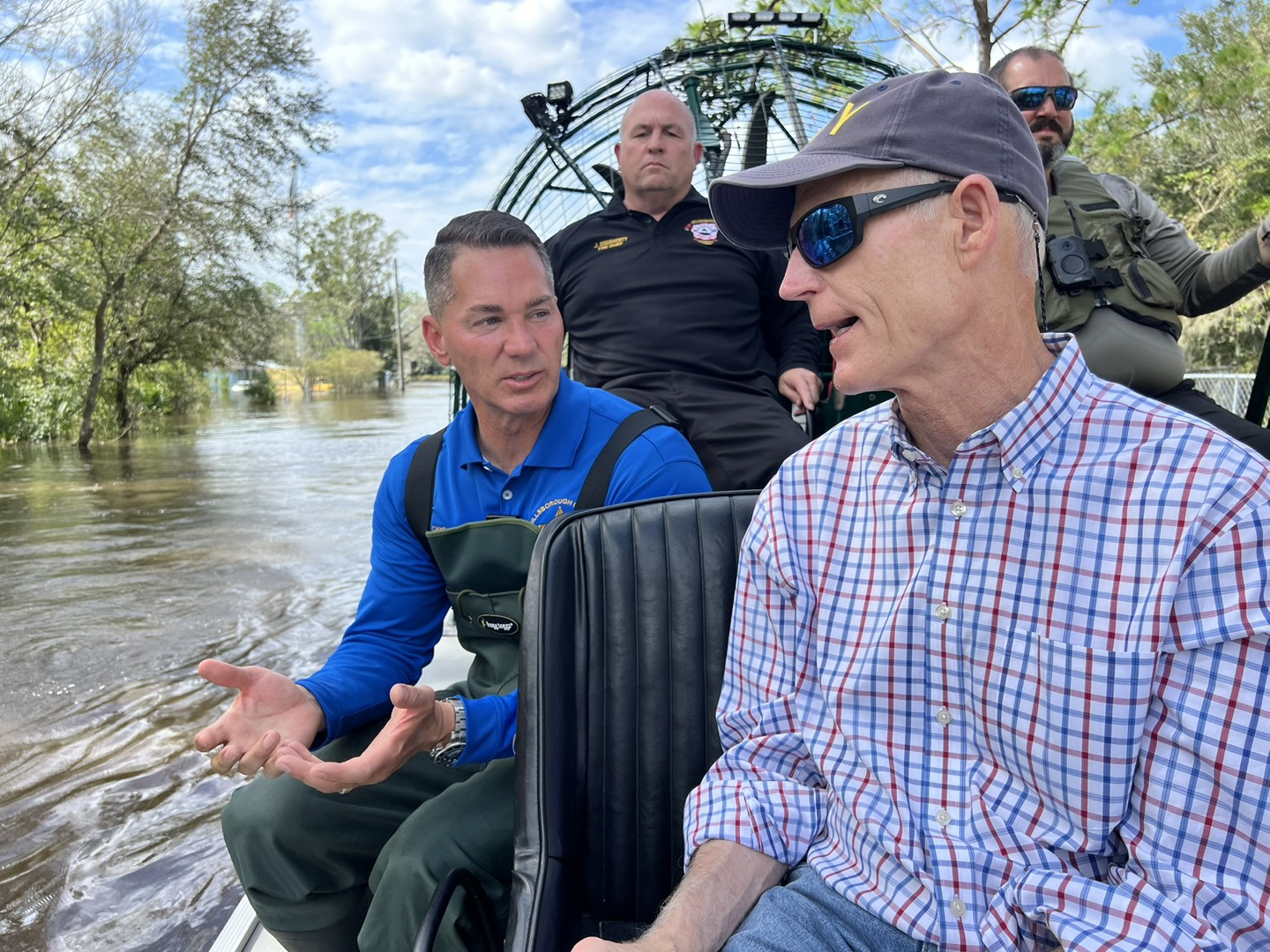
Senator Rick Scott and Sheriff Chad Chronister surveying damage in Hillsborough County after Hurricane Milton, 2024

The following is a partial list of incumbent (bolded) and former Florida sheriffs.

Current and former Florida sheriffs
Name	County
Malcolm Beard	Hillsborough County
Kevin Beary	Orange County
Susan Benton	Highlands County
**Ric Bradshaw**	Palm Beach County
John Broxson	Santa Rosa County
Mills O. Burnham	St. Lucia County
Bob Butterworth	Broward County
Ferrin Campbell	Okaloosa County
Dale Carson	Duval County
**Mike Chitwood**	Volusia County
**Chad Chronister**	Hillsborough County
**Rosie Cordero-Stutz**	Miami-Dade County
Jerry Demings	Orange County
William A. Freeman	Monroe County
David Gee	Hillsborough County
Nat Glover	Duval County
**Bob Gualtieri**	Pinellas County
Peter Monroe Hagan	Putnam County
Scott Israel	Broward County
Ken Jenne	Broward County
**Grady Judd**	Polk County
Al Lamberti	Broward County
**Dennis Lemma**	Seminole County
Ken Mascara	St. Lucie County
Willis V. McCall	Lake County
Jim McMillan	Duval County
**John Mina**	Orange County
Nick Navarro	Broward County
Rich Nugent	Hernando County
Roy Frank Roberts	Brevard County
John Rutherford	Duval County
**Chip Simmons**	Escambia County
William Snyder	Martin County
Edward J. Stack	Broward County
**Gregory Tony**	Broward County
William Whitaker	Sarasota County
Theodore Hartridge Willard	Madison County
**Morris A. Young**	Gadsden County
**T. K. Waters**	Duval County
Bobby McCallum	Levy County
Bobby Schultz	Gilchrist County
Darby Butler	Dixie County

== See also ==
- Sheriffs in the United States
- Supervisor of Elections (Florida)
