= Volusia County Courthouse =

Local courthouse for Volusia County, Florida

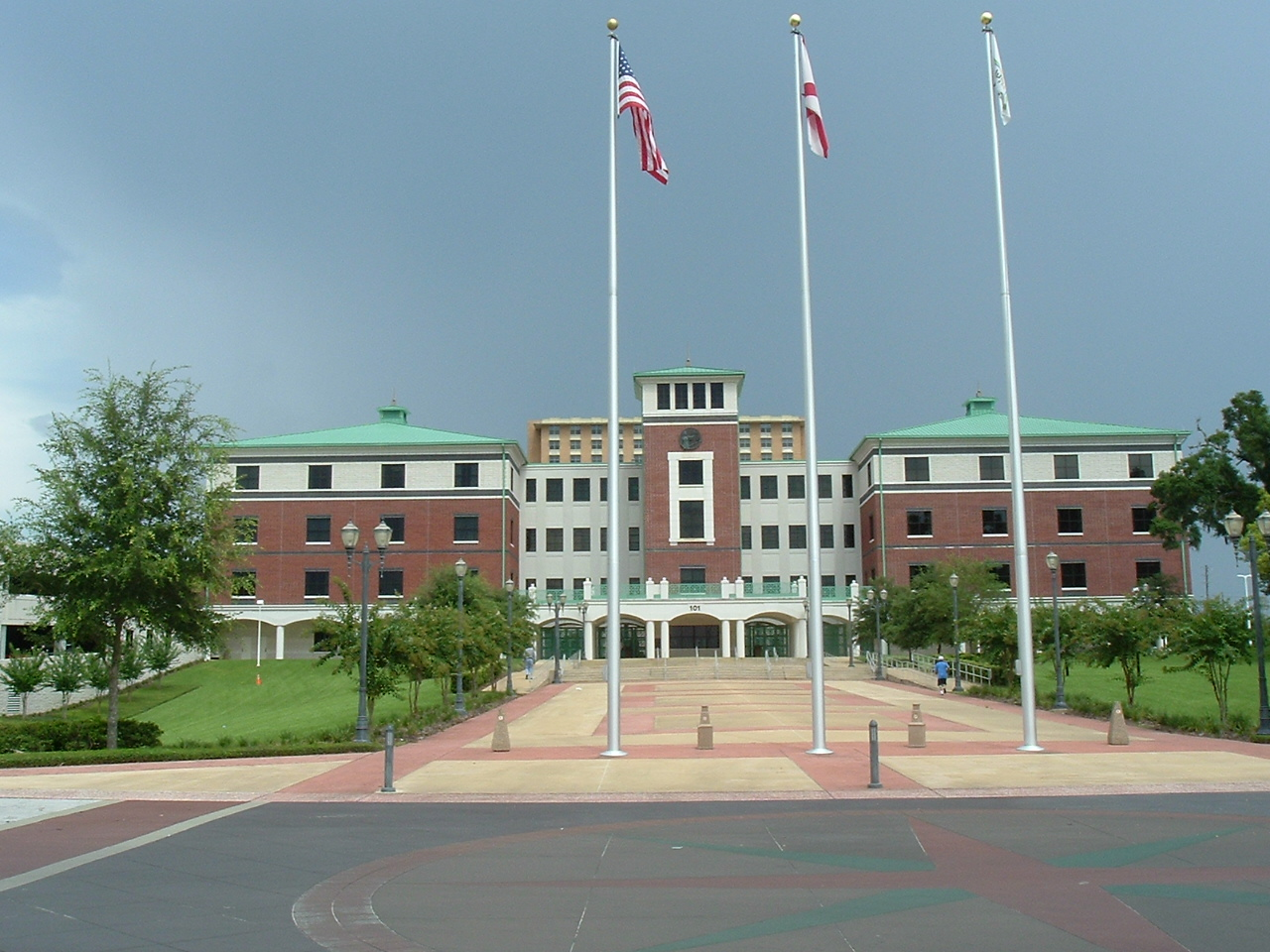
- Volusia County Courthouse
- Interactive map showing the location for Volusia County Courthouse

General information
- Location: 101 N. Alabama Ave., DeLand, Florida, 32724
- Coordinates: 29°01′44″N 81°18′01″W
- Completed: 2001

Technical details
- Material: Brick and concrete
- Floor count: 4

The Volusia County Courthouse is the local courthouse for Volusia County, Florida. It houses courtrooms and judges from the Volusia County and Seventh Judicial Circuit Courts. The new facility is located DeLand, Florida; it was completed and opened in 2001.

== History ==
The Volusia County Courthouse opened in 2001. The courthouse is made of precast concrete with a brick facade. The building is four-stories tall and contains a large clock tower. The new courthouse was constructed as a project of then Volusia County Clerk Diane Matousek. The old Volusia County Courthouse, built in 1929, was decommissioned as the local justice center upon the completion of the new courthouse in 2001.

The courthouse is the official seat of the Clerk of the Circuit Court of Volusia County and the judges of the county court.

In August 2024, the Volusia Sheriff's Office arrested a man who brought a stolen and loaded firearm into the courthouse. According to Sheriff Mike Chitwood, the suspect was a convicted felon who claimed to have a meeting with the elected public defender.

== See also ==
- Putnam County Courthouse
- Highlands County Courthouse
- List of Florida county courthouses
