= Rosie Cordero-Stutz =

American law enforcement officer

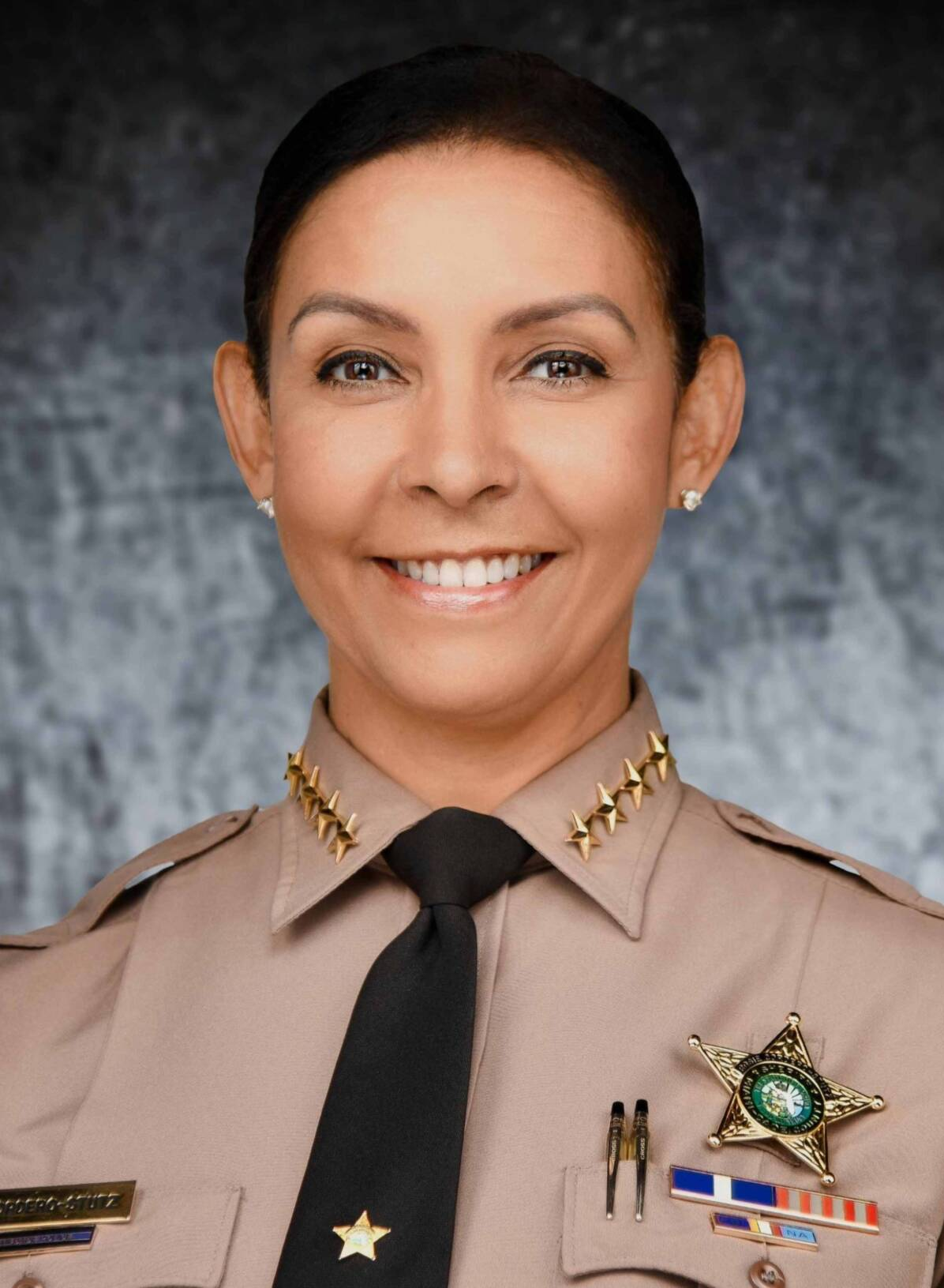
- Official portrait, 2025

Sheriff of Miami-Dade County
- Incumbent
- Assumed office January 7, 2025
- Preceded by: T. A. Buchanan (1966)

Personal details
- Born: 1969/1970 (age 55) Dominican Republic
- Party: Independent (Note: The office of Sheriff is officially a nonpartisan elected position, and the officeholder serves in a nonpartisan capacity throughout their term.)
- Other political affiliations: Republican
- Children: 1
- Education: Marist University (BCJ); Florida International University (MPA)
- Police career
- Allegiance: Miami-Dade County
- Department: Miami-Dade Sheriff's Office
- Service years: 1996–present
- Rank: Sheriff

Rosie Cordero-Stutz (born 1969/1970) is a Dominican American law enforcement officer and politician who has served as the sheriff of Miami-Dade County since 2025. A member of the Republican Party, she is the first Miami-Dade County sheriff since 1966. Cordero-Stutz is also the first Hispanic American woman sheriff in Florida history and the first female Miami-Dade County sheriff.

== Early life and education ==
Cordero-Stutz was born in the Dominican Republic and immigrated to the United States with her family at a young age. She was raised by her mother in New York City. She graduated from Marist University with a bachelor's degree in criminal justice. Cordero-Stutz received her Master of Public Administration from Florida International University.

== Police career ==
Cordero-Stutz joined the Miami-Dade Police Department in 1996. After graduating from the police academy, she served as a patrol officer in the Northside District. In 2004, she passed the sergeant's exam and was assigned to the Robbery Intervention Detail and later the Homicide Bureau. In 2008, she was promoted to police lieutenant. Cordero-Stutz was promoted again to police major in 2013. In 2020, she was promoted to police division chief of the North Operations Division. In 2022, she was promoted to assistant director of Support Services.

== Sheriff of Miami-Dade County (2025–present) ==
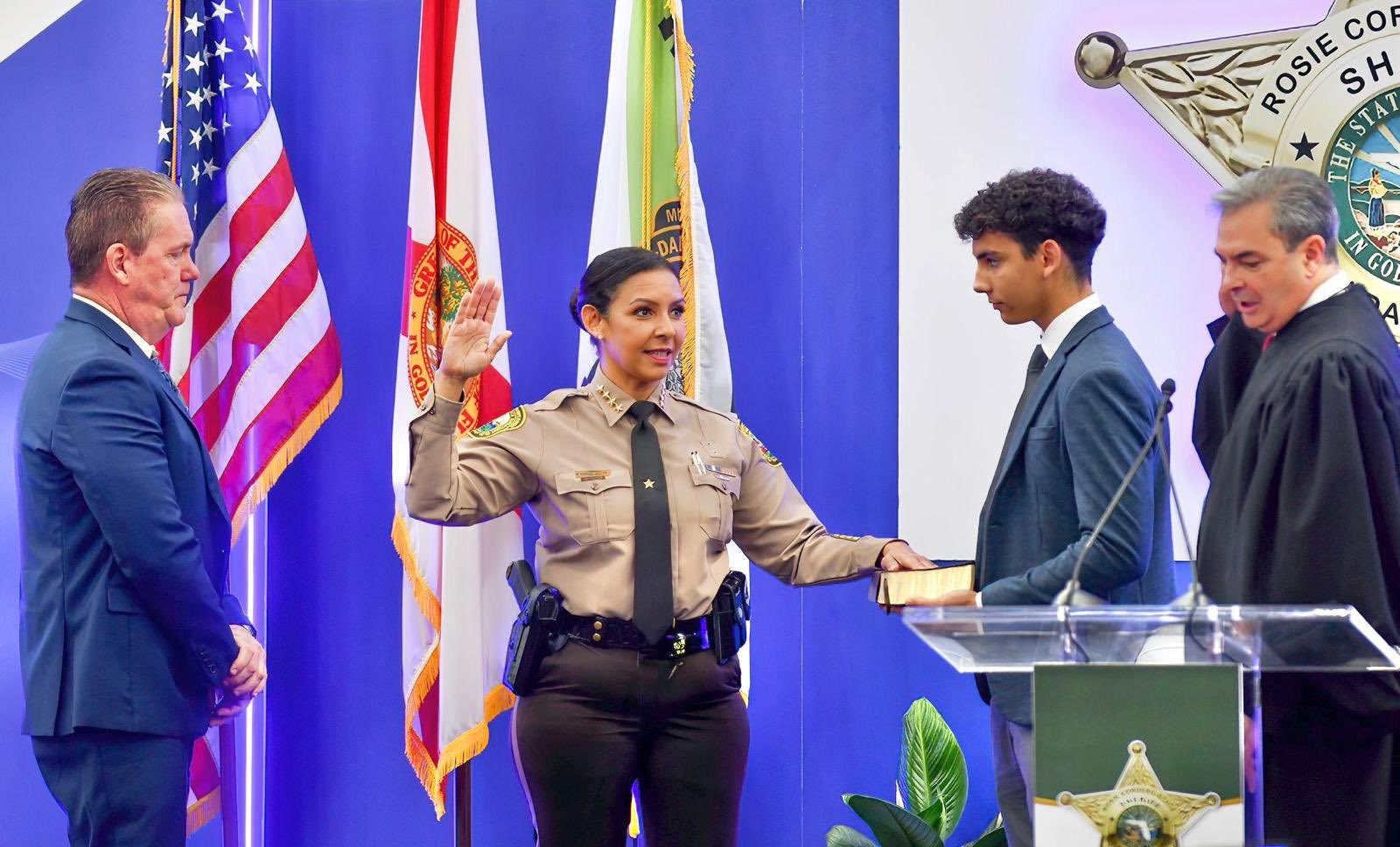
Cordero-Stutz sworn in as the first female sheriff of Miami-Dade County

=== 2024 Miami-Dade County Sheriff election ===
In 1966, the position of Miami-Dade County sheriff was abolished in a referendum following a series of scandals under Sheriff Talmadge "T. A." Buchanan. In 2018, a state constitutional amendment was passed that made the position an independent elected office, along with the roles of Miami-Dade County tax collector, property appraiser, and supervisor of elections.

Cordero-Stutz defeated 10 opponents in the August 20, 2024, Republican primary, securing the Republican nomination for Miami-Dade County sheriff. She faced Democratic nominee James Reyes in the general election. Cordero-Stutz was endorsed by then-former President Donald Trump, Governor Ron DeSantis, Senator Rick Scott, Congressman Carlos A. Giménez, Congressman Mario Díaz-Balart, County commissioner Kevin Marino Cabrera, County commissioner René García, Hialeah mayor Esteban Bovo, former Miami Beach mayor Philip Levine, and 27 incumbent Florida sheriffs, including Grady Judd, T. K. Waters, Bob Gualtieri, and Morris A. Young. During the campaign, Reyes was accused of sending "misleading" campaign mailers about Cordero-Stutz to residents. The October 2024 debate took place a month after the Tyreek Hill traffic stop, which Reyes had been embroiled in as Miami-Dade County public safety chief. The debate moderator, Jim Defede, noted Reyes never served as a police officer. Both candidates favored greater accountability in law enforcement, but differed in their approach. Cordero-Stutz proposed administrative policy changes while Reyes focused on the "importance of culture" and leadership. In the November general election, Cordero-Stutz defeated Reyes with 56% of the vote, becoming the first Miami-Dade County sheriff-elect since 1962. Her election coincided with a Republican sweep of Miami-Dade County's constitutional officers.

=== Tenure ===
On January 7, 2025, Cordero-Stutz was sworn into office, becoming the first Hispanic American woman sheriff in Florida history. She also became the first Miami-Dade County sheriff since 1966, the first female Miami-Dade County sheriff, and the first Latina sheriff of Miami-Dade County.

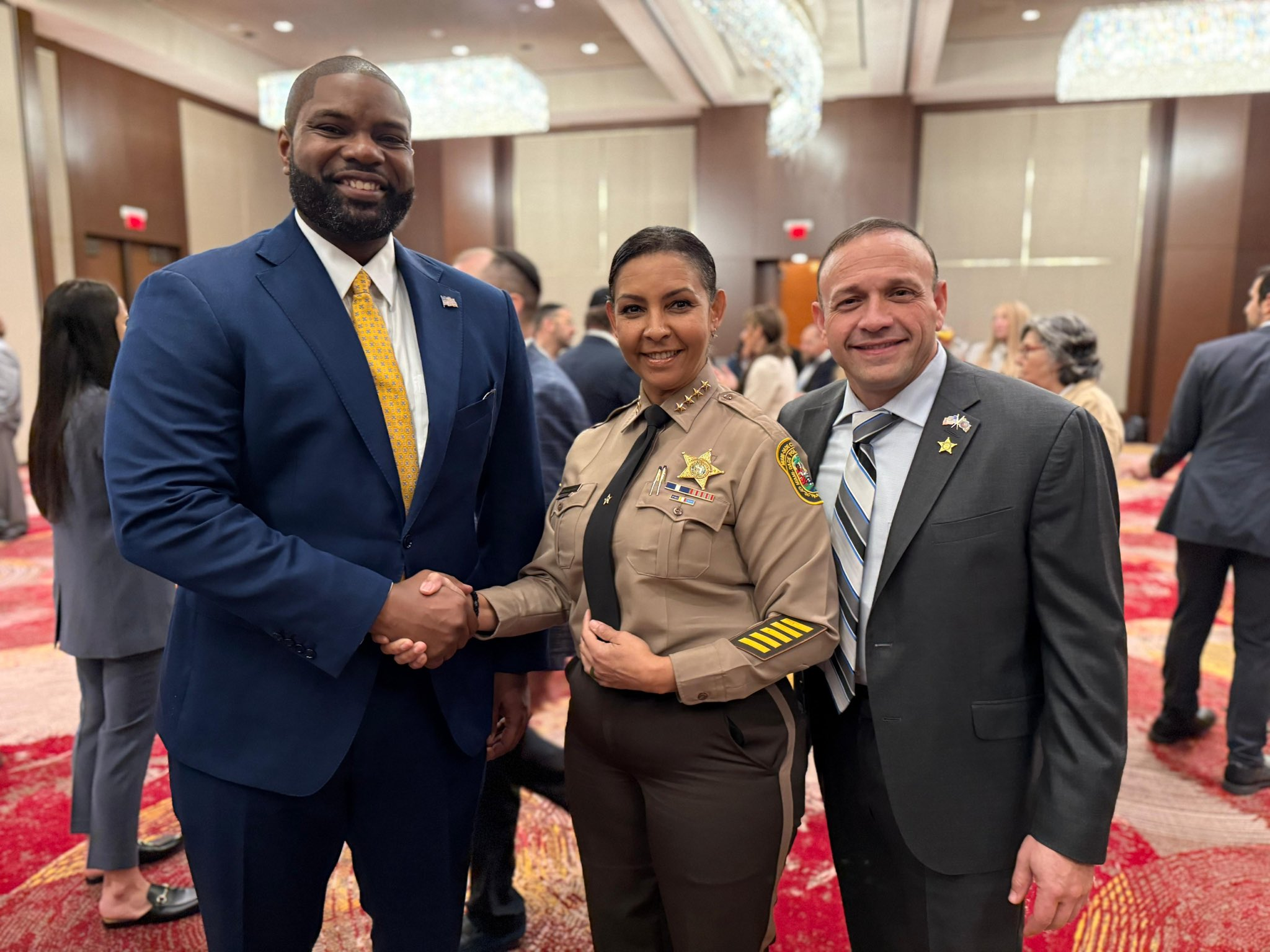
Cordero-Stutz with Florida congressman Byron Donalds, 2025

== Electoral history ==
2024 Miami-Dade County Sheriff election
Party	Candidate	Votes	%
Republican	Rosie Cordero-Stutz	563,828	55.7
Democratic	James Reyes	448,359	44.3
Total votes		1,012,187	100.00

2024 Miami-Dade County Sheriff Republican primary election
Party	Candidate	Votes	%
Republican	Rosie Cordero-Stutz	27,074	24.5
Republican	Joe Sanchez	24,688	22.3
Republican	Mario Knapp	15,572	14.1
Republican	Ernesto Rodriguez	10,551	9.5
Republican	Joe Martinez	10,466	9.5
Republican	Jose Aragu	10,077	9.1
Republican	Ignacio Alvarez	6,669	9.0
Republican	John Rivera	1,605	1.5
Republican	Ruamen DeLaRua	1,362	1.2
Republican	Jeffrey Giordano	1,291	1.2
Republican	Alex Fornet	1,241	1.1
Total votes		110,596	100.00

== Personal life ==
Cordero-Stutz is married. They have one son, Evan.

Political offices
Preceded by T. A. Buchanan	Sheriff of Miami-Dade County; 2025–present	Incumbent
Party political offices
Preceded by N/A	Republican nominee for Sheriff of Miami-Dade County; 2024	Most recent
