= List of killings by law enforcement officers in the United States, September 2013 =

This is a list of people reported killed by non-military law enforcement officers in the United States in September 2013, whether in the line of duty or not, and regardless of reason or method. The listing documents the occurrence of a death, making no implications regarding wrongdoing or justification on the part of the person killed or officer involved. Killings are arranged by date of the incident that caused death. Different death dates, if known, are noted in the description. The table below lists 75 people.

== September 2013 ==
Date	Name (Age) of Deceased	Race	State (City)	Description
2013-09-30	Wendy Lawrence (45)		New Hampshire (Manchester)	Lawrence fled police following a traffic stop on I-93. She was pursued into a residential neighborhood, where she was shot and killed in her car by police.
2013-09-29	A.J. Marion (19)	Black	North Carolina (Asheville)	Marion was pursued on foot into a wooded area following report of burglary. He was unarmed when shot, but police say he had a gun during the chase.
2013-09-29	Travis Davis (37)	White	Utah (Grantsville)	Officers went to Davis’ home after receiving a request for a welfare check from his family. Davis had threatened to harm himself. When officers arrived at Davis’ home, he was barricaded inside. Davis eventually exited the home through a back door, at which time officers saw that he was carrying a gun. At some point while interacting with Davis, officers opened fire.
2013-09-28	Austin Jones (34)	White	Maryland (Havre de Grace)	Jones was shot by a Special Response Team after he barricaded himself in a room with and "pointed an object at officers" while they were negotiating with him to surrender during a three-hour standoff. A hostage was released prior to the shooting.
2013-09-27	Caleb Hector (19)	White	Texas (Big Spring)	
2013-09-26	Tavaris Lokeco Gulley (34)	Black	Alabama (Citronelle)	
2013-09-26	John DelReal (39)	White	California (Long Beach)	DelReal approached an officer in a "threatening manner" reaching for something in his waist. The officer shot him. The object in his waistband was a small silver bat.
2013-09-26	Eric Poore (27)	White	Indiana (Plainfield)	Poore was shot by police during a home invasion.
2013-09-26	William Hall (57)	White	Texas (Dallas)	Hall had shot a burglar, Jerry Wayne Hayle (later died), while defending his home. When police arrived, Hall was standing over the body the burglar and did not drop his weapon on verbal command. Police then shot and killed him.
2013-09-26	Erick Balint (32)	Hispanic	California (Long Beach)	Balint was killed exchanging gunfire with police during a foot-chase.
2013-09-25	Ponciano Montemayor (55)	Hispanic	Texas (Houston)	
2013-09-25	Jose Luis Millan (21)	Hispanic	Texas (Waelder)	
2013-09-24	Connor Zion (21)	White	California (Laguna Niguel)	
2013-09-23	Tracy Bost (22)	Black	North Carolina (Durham)	Authorities say Bost was shot after he fired a shotgun blast at campus police at N.C. Central University who were approaching him. Police said he matched the description of a man wanted by Durham police in connection with a burglary and armed robbery.
2013-09-23	Kenneth Sprankle (27)	White	Florida (St. Petersburg)	Sprankle had a history of mental illness. He was shot by police after chasing people with an ax.
2013-09-23	Jeffrey Watts (47)	White	Massachusetts (Brockton)	Suspected robber Watts was fatally shot after firing at police during chase.
2013-09-23	Antonio Nash (18)	Black	Missouri (St. Louis)	Nash was shot and killed by an off-duty police officer during an attempted robbery.
2013-09-22	Luke Castello (22)	White	Florida (Port Orange)	Police shot and killed Castello, a robbery and attempted kidnapping suspect, after displaying a handgun towards the officers during a car chase.
2013-09-22	Breanne Sharpe (19)	White	California (Chico)	Believing that the car could be stolen, officers attempted to stop it, but the driver, who was later identified as Breanne Sharpe, kept going. As the suspect accelerated towards officers, several officers fired shots until Sharpe's vehicle came to a stop, police said.
2013-09-21	David Ward (66)	White	California (Culver City)	Ward followed a police care into a secure parking lot at police headquarters. Police asked him what he was doing and he told them that he had a gun. Officers then shot him.
2013-09-21	Andrew Reed (58)	White	Colorado (Denver)	Reed was shot following a bank robbery by an off-duty police officer.
2013-09-21	Steven Byrdo (24)	Black	Indiana (Indianapolis)	Police broke down a door where they heard a woman screaming. Byrdo fatally shot one officer. A second officer then shot and killed him.
2013-09-20	Carlos Fuentes (20)	Hispanic	California (Ivanhoe)	
2013-09-18	Larry Nortonsen (53)	White	Florida (Winter Garden)	
2013-09-18	Ruben Ramos-Escobedo (59)	Hispanic	California (Los Angeles)	
2013-09-18	Misraim Nathaniel Cisneros (20)	Hispanic	Texas (Houston)	http://www.yourhoustonnews.com/cypresscreek/news/hcso-identifies-suspect-shot-by-reserve-deputy/article_662c87d6-2154-11e3-b81b-001a4bcf887a.html
2013-09-17	Charles Adrien Martin (40)	White	Arkansas (Judsonia)	Martin was fatally shot by SWAT team after firing on them during a standoff.
2013-09-17	Derek Deandre Walker (26)	Black	North Carolina (Durham)	A police officer shot and killed Walker as he waved a gun in downtown Durham.
2013-09-16	Mitchell Alanda St. Clair Jr. (39)	Black	South Carolina (Columbia)	
2013-09-16	Justin Bryan Harger (32)	White	California (Bakersfield)	Killed during shootout with police. Harger's mother, said police showed up to her home just days before his death and said they would kill Justin when they found him.
2013-09-16	Jorge Ramirez (34)	Hispanic	California (Bakersfield)	Ramirez, an informant, was killed during a shootout with police. His death was highlighted in the ABC documentary Killing County.
2013-09-16	Aaron Alexis (34)	Black	Washington, D.C.	Alexis was killed in a gunbattle with police during the Washington Navy Yard shooting, which killed 12 people and injured 3 others.
2013-09-14	Jonathan Ferrell (24)	Black	North Carolina (Charlotte)	Police were responding to a 911 call of a suspicious man outside a woman's home. Three officers arrived, and Ferrell allegedly began running toward them. One officer fired a stun gun, which police say malfunctioned, and then Officer Randall Kerrick shot Ferrell several times, killing him. Ferrell was unarmed, and had apparently walked to the woman's house from his severely crashed vehicle nearby and was looking for help. Officer Kerrick has been charged with voluntary manslaughter.
2013-09-14	Lance L. Danielson (30)	White	Arizona (Phoenix)	
2013-09-14	Samuel Frazier (56)	Black	Georgia (Savannah)	
2013-09-14	Courtney Andrew Hollomon (30)	Black	Virginia (Virginia Beach)	
2013-09-14	R.T. McGinty (27)	Black	Arizona (Avondale)	McGinty opened fire on police when they tried to stop him at about 4:45 p.m. Saturday as he rode a bicycle. Officers returned fire and fatally shot McGinty.
2013-09-14	Hector Jimenez (50)	Hispanic	California (Riverside)	Police responded to a call of a man in his yard holding a knife acting bizarrely. He was shot when police claim he lunged towards officers with the knife.
2013-09-12	Austin Del Castillo (36)	Hispanic	Arizona (Tempe)	
2013-09-12	John Schultz (66)	White	California (Menifee)	
2013-09-10	William Brown (31)	Black	Maryland (Annapolis)	Brown was shot dead by police after fatally stabbing his girlfriend.
2013-09-10	Carlos Ernesto Oliva Sola (23)	Hispanic	California (Los Angeles)	
2013-09-09	Daniel Richard Vasquez (33)	Hispanic	Texas (Mabank)	
2013-09-09	Jerry Blaine Barnes Jr	White	Texas (Houston)	
2013-09-08	Shawn Evans (56)	White	Pennsylvania (Pittsburgh)	
2013-09-07	Devon Costa (21)	White	California (Simi Valley)	Costa was shot after punching an officer in the face and reaching for her gun.
2013-09-07	Lelann Cooley (46)	White	Florida (St. Petersburg)	Cooley was shot at his home when he pointed a rifle at police responding to a noise complaint.
2013-09-07	Marion Horton (28)	Black	Illinois (Chicago)	Horton was involved in an altercation with a security guard when an off-duty Chicago Police officer shot him. The officer said he was concerned that Horton would reach the security guard's gun.
2013-09-07	John Edward Shanks (29)	White	Tennessee (Jasper)	
2013-09-07	Monroe Isadore (107)	Black	Arkansas (Pine Bluff)	Police arrived at a residence in response to reports of a disturbance. Isadore confronted them with a handgun and retreated into a bedroom, firing on them when they attempted to enter. SWAT officers arrived as backup and, after failed negotiations, released gas into the room and broke down the door. Isadore fired on them as they entered, and they returned fire, killing him.
2013-09-07	Michael "The Duke" DeLuca (53)	White	California (Port Hueneme)	A man was shot and killed by Port Hueneme police during a traffic stop.
2013-09-07	Lealann Russell Melder Cooley (46)	White	Florida (St Petersburg)	
2013-09-07	Moses Baeza (25)	Hispanic	Arizona (Phoenix)	
2013-09-06	Charlie Bates (24)	Black	Florida (Tampa)	Bates was the suspect in multiple home invasions and sexual assaults. He was fatally shot during a shootout following a car chase.
2013-09-06	Domingo Soto (32)	White	Texas (Dallas)	
2013-09-06	Ray Anson Mitchell (37)	Black	Alabama (Mobile)	
2013-09-06	Eric Reed (25)	Native American	Arizona (Window Rock)	
2013-09-05	Benjamin Hickey (45)	Black	Georgia (College Park)	Police said the officer noticed a suspicious man in the area and exchanged fire with the shooter. The gunman died in the shooting.
2013-09-05	Denis Reynoso (30)	Black	Massachusetts (Lynn)	A man was fatally shot by police after they say he grabbed an officer's gun inside his apartment.
2013-09-05	Kenneth Bedgood (36)	Black	Alabama (Mobile)	Following stolen vehicle pursuit, Bedgood abandoned vehicle and fled on foot. Police say he shot at them, and they exchanged gunfire killing him.
2013-09-05	Kendrick Lee Amest (29)	Black	Texas (Houston)	
2013-09-04	Donte Bennett (25)	Black	Maryland (Baltimore)	Following a foot chase, police shot and killed Bennett when, police claim, he pulled a handgun. Witnesses dispute that Bennett had a gun, saying he had a phone in his hand when police shot him.
2013-09-04	Juan Ruelas (34)	Hispanic	California (Sunnyvale)	Ruelas, a drug-dealing suspect, was shot 29 times by six undercover Santa Clara County law enforcement officers when he was standing next to his truck in the Hobee's restaurant parking lot. Ruelas said that he had a gun on him and put his hand in his pocket, prompting officers to believe he had a firearm on him and that he was going to fire on them. He did not have a weapon on him. An autopsy concluded that Ruelas was high on amphetamine and methamphetamine. In September 2014, the district attorney announced that no charges will be filed against any of the law enforcement officers who shot Ruelas.
2013-09-03	Seth Victor (40)	White	Connecticut (New Britain)	Police responded to a disturbance at a third-floor apartment. Victor was throwing items out the window and threatened to commit suicide if police entered. After a several-hour standoff, police entered the apartment, a struggle ensued, and Victor was Tasered. After coming under police control, it was noticed that Victor had trouble breathing and he was taken to a hospital, where he was eventually pronounced dead.
2013-09-03	Henry Montgomery (31)	Black	Mississippi (Tupelo)	
2013-09-02	Jeffrey S. Frump (44)	White	Kentucky (Gray)	
2013-09-02	Norman Oosterbroek (43)	White	Florida (Pinecrest)	
2013-09-02	Sonny Lam (43)	Asian	California (Los Banos)	
2013-09-02	Philip Rank (47)	Unknown	Pennsylvania (St. Thomas)	Officers attempted to serve a warrant, but Rank barricaded himself in the house. When he came out holding a weapon he was shot.
2013-09-02	Ronald Sexton (23)	White	Florida (St. Petersburg)	Officers were called to the home of Sexton about an argument with his neighbor. When they arrived they say he answered the door holding a gun. He was fatally shot on his porch.
2013-09-01	Brian Tacadena (46)	Hispanic	California (Santa Barbara)	Officers confronted Tacadena, holding a knife, ordered him to drop it and he refused. They fired on him, killing him.
2013-09-01	Casey Nicholas Smith (34)	White	South Carolina (Anderson)	
2013-09-01	Jaime Benavidez (27)	Hispanic	Indiana (Elkhart)	
2013-09-01	Michael Troy Swatosh (25)	Native Hawaiian and Pacific Islander	Oklahoma (Tulsa)	
2013-09-01	Freddy Aleysi Gutierrez (28)	Hispanic	Texas (Houston)	

== See also ==
- Death in custody § United States
- Henry A. Wallace Police Crime Public Database
- List of cases of police brutality
- List of countries with annual rates and counts for killings by law enforcement officers
- List of law enforcement officers killed in the line of duty in the United States
- List of law enforcement officers convicted for an on-duty killing in the United States
- List of shootings by US immigration agents
- List of police reforms related to the George Floyd protests
- List of unarmed African Americans killed by law enforcement officers in the United States
- Lists of killings by law enforcement officers
- Police brutality in the United States
- Police misconduct § United States
- Police riot § United States
- Police use of deadly force in the United States
