= Columbia College =

Columbia College may refer to one of several institutions of higher education in North America:

== Canada ==
- Columbia College (Alberta), a private post-secondary institution in Calgary
- Columbia College (British Columbia), a two-year liberal arts institution in Vancouver
- Columbia International College, a private preparatory school in Hamilton, Ontario

== United States ==
Listed alphabetically by state

- Columbia College (California), a community college in Sonora, California
- Columbia College Hollywood, a film school in Los Angeles, California
- Columbia College, an historical college in Lake City, Florida, now merged with Stetson University
- Columbia College Chicago, a large arts and communications college in Chicago, Illinois
- Loras College, a private Catholic college in Dubuque, Iowa, known as Columbia College during 1920–1939
- Columbia College (Missouri), a liberal arts college in Columbia, Missouri
- Columbia University, New York, known as Columbia College during 1784–1896
  - Columbia College (New York), the university's oldest undergraduate college
- Columbia College (Oregon), a former college in Eugene, Oregon
- Milton-Freewater City Hall, a building in Milton-Freewater, Oregon, listed on the National Register of Historic Places as Columbia College
- Columbia College (South Carolina), a private women's liberal arts college in Columbia
- Columbia College (Virginia), a private vocational college in Vienna, Centreville, Virginia, and in Silver Spring, Maryland
- Columbia College (Washington) (also known as Columbia Lutheran College), a closed Lutheran college in Everett, Washington that was absorbed into what is now Pacific Lutheran University in 1919–20
- Columbia College of Nursing, Glendale, Wisconsin

== See also ==
- Columba College, a Presbyterian school in Dunedin, New Zealand
- Columbia University (disambiguation)
- Columbian College, former name of George Washington University
- Columbia State Community College, Columbia, Tennessee
- Lower Columbia College, Longview, Washington
