= Dennis Lemma =

American law enforcement officer (born 1971)

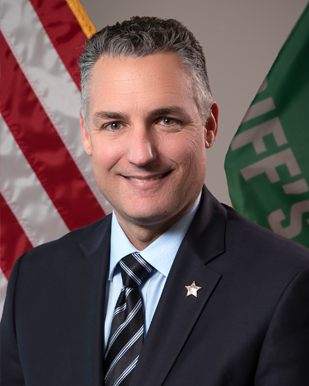
- Official portrait, 2025

10th Sheriff of Seminole County
- Incumbent
- Assumed office January 3, 2017
- Preceded by: Donald F. Eslinger

Personal details
- Born: November 18, 1971 (age 54)
- Party: Republican
- Spouse: Diana Lemma
- Children: 2
- Education: Columbia College (BCJ); University of Oklahoma (MSL); FBI National Academy

Military service
- Branch/service: United States Marine Corps
- Police career
- Allegiance: Seminole County
- Department: Seminole County Sheriff's Office
- Service years: 1992–present
- Rank: Sheriff

Dennis M. Lemma (born November 18, 1971) is an American politician, law enforcement officer, and Marine Corps veteran who has served as the 10th sheriff of Seminole County, Florida since 2017. A member of the Republican Party, he previously served as chief deputy sheriff before his election.

== Early life and career ==
Lemma was born on November 18, 1971. He earned his bacherlor's degree from Columbia College and received his master's degree from the University of Oklahoma. Lemma is a graduate of the FBI National Academy and served in the United States Marine Corps.

In 1992, Lemma joined the Seminole County Sheriff's Office, beginning his career as a correctional officer. He served as the sheriff's office's primary spokesperson and received promotions from the ranks of sergeant, lieutenant, captain, major and chief deputy prior to becoming sheriff.

== Sheriff of Seminole County (2017–present) ==
In August 2015, longtime county sheriff Donald F. Eslinger announced he would not seek re-election in 2016 and "all but endorsed" Lemma for the position. Lemma was the only candidate to qualify for the election and was declared sheriff-elect in June 2016. On January 3, 2017, he was sworn in as the 10th sheriff of Seminole County.

As sheriff, he was significantly involved in the COVID-19 pandemic response in Seminole County; enforcing mandatory curfews and mask mandates. Lemma also served during the George Floyd protests, responding by increasing minority recruiting.

In 2020, Lemma was re-elected to a second term, defeating Democratic nominee Paul "Spike" Hopkins, with 58% of the vote.

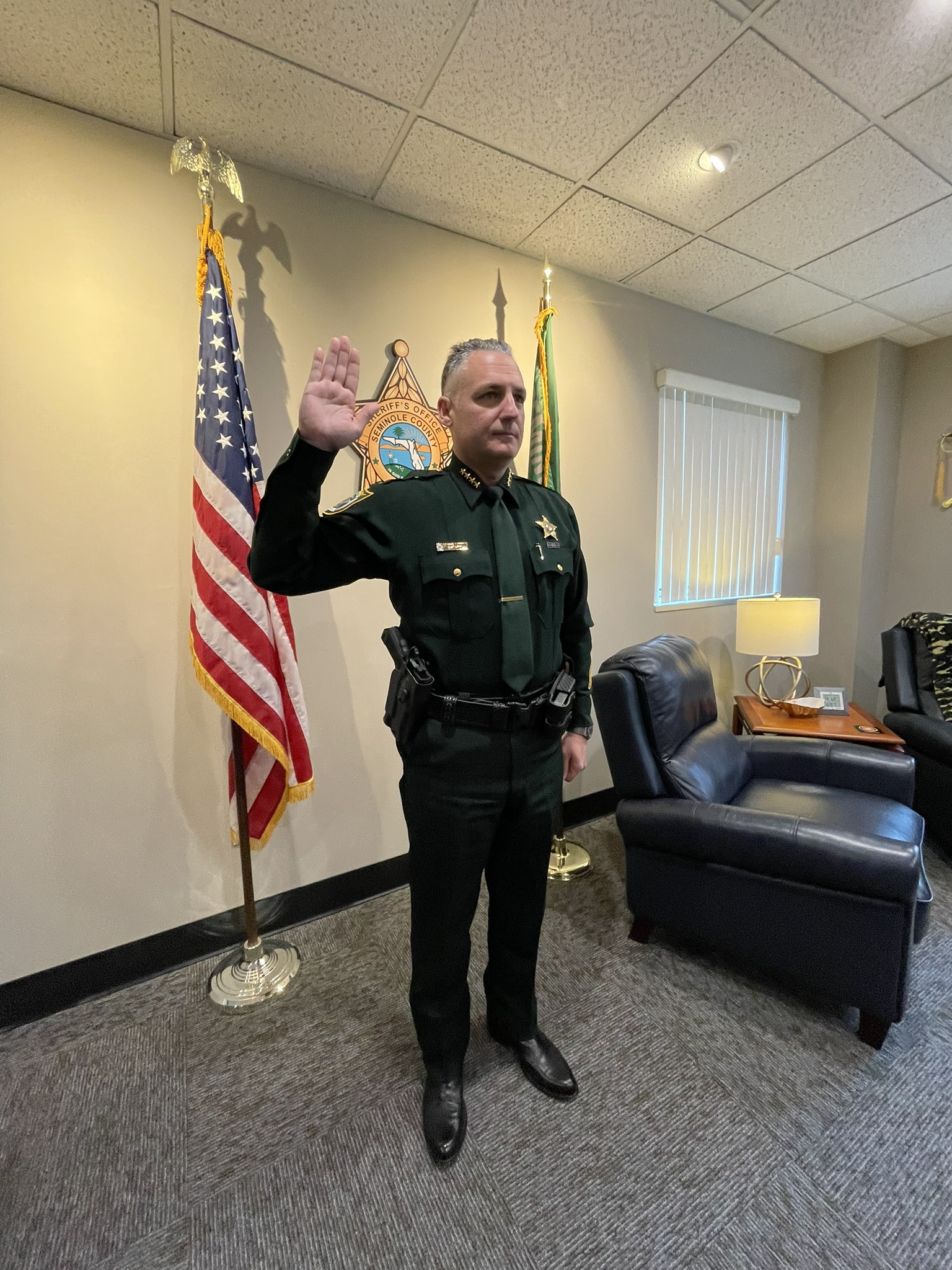
Lemma being sworn in to his third term as Seminole County sheriff, 2025

In 2024, Lemma was re-elected unopposed to a third term as sheriff.

== Personal life ==
Lemma is married to his wife, Diana; they have two sons, Dylan and Dayne, and live in Oviedo, Florida. In 2023, Dylan Lemma was arrested in Seminole County for reckless driving and fleeing from sheriff's deputies. Sheriff Lemma commented on the arrest, saying: "I firmly believe that my family should be held to the same standard as anyone else in the community, and while I love my son and family dearly, they, too, are not above the law."

Political offices
Preceded by Don Eslinger	Sheriff of Seminole County; 2017–present	Incumbent
Party political offices
Preceded by Don Eslinger	Republican nominee for Sheriff of Seminole County; 2016, 2020, 2024	Most recent
