= Edward Alexander =

Edward Alexander may refer to:

- Edward Porter Alexander (1835–1910), mathematician, author, and Confederate Civil War soldier from Washington, Georgia
- Edward P. Alexander (1907–2003), museum administrator and author from Edmeston, New York
- Eddie Alexander (born 1964), Scottish cyclist
- Edward Alexander (actor) (1886–1964), American actor, see Film adaptations of Uncle Tom's Cabin
- Edward Alexander (professor) (1936–2020), American professor emeritus of English
- Edward Bruce Alexander (1872–1955), British civil servant in Ceylon
- Edward Johnston Alexander (1901–1985), American botanist
- Edward I. Alexander (1850–1911), Florida state legislator
- Edward Perkins Alexander (1863–1931), Welsh rugby union player
- Edward McGill Alexander (born 1947), general in the South African Army*
- Edward Alexander (footballer) (born 2005), Liberian football player
