= VCSO =

VCSO may refer to:

- Vice Chief of Space Operations
- Volusia Sheriff's Office
- Ventura County Sheriff's Office
