= Nick Finch =

American sheriff

Sheriff of Liberty County, Florida

Personal details
- Party: CSPOA
- Occupation: Law enforcement officer

Military service
- Allegiance: Posse Comitatus

Nick Finch is a former sheriff of Liberty County, Florida. He is a member of the Constitutional Sheriffs and Peace Officers Association as well as the Posse Comitatus group, who believed that sheriffs are the ultimate arbiters of constitutionality in the United States.

== See also ==
- Morris A. Young#Furlough program court case
