= Edward I. Alexander =

Florida state legislator (c. 1850–1911)

Edward I. Alexander Sr. (c. 1850-1911) was a grocer, state legislator, city councilman, and postmaster in Florida. He represented Madison County, Florida in the Florida House of Representatives in 1877, 1879, and 1885. He sought to represent Madison County, Florida in the Florida House of Representatives in 1885.

He was involved in a contested election with Theodore H. Willard for a Florida Senate seat. Both received votes for a seat in the Florida Senate in 1888.

== See also ==
- African American officeholders from the end of the Civil War until before 1900
