= Columbia University (disambiguation) =

Columbia University is the historical and colloquial name of Columbia University in the City of New York.

Columbia University may also refer to:

- Columbia College, the oldest undergraduate school of Columbia University
- The University of Portland, formerly known as Columbia University

== See also ==
- Columbia College (disambiguation)
- Columbian College, former name of George Washington University
- National University of Colombia, in Colombia, South America
- South Colombian University, in Colombia, South America
- University of British Columbia, in Vancouver and Kelowna, British Columbia
