= Grady Judd =

Sheriff of Polk County, Florida (born 1954)

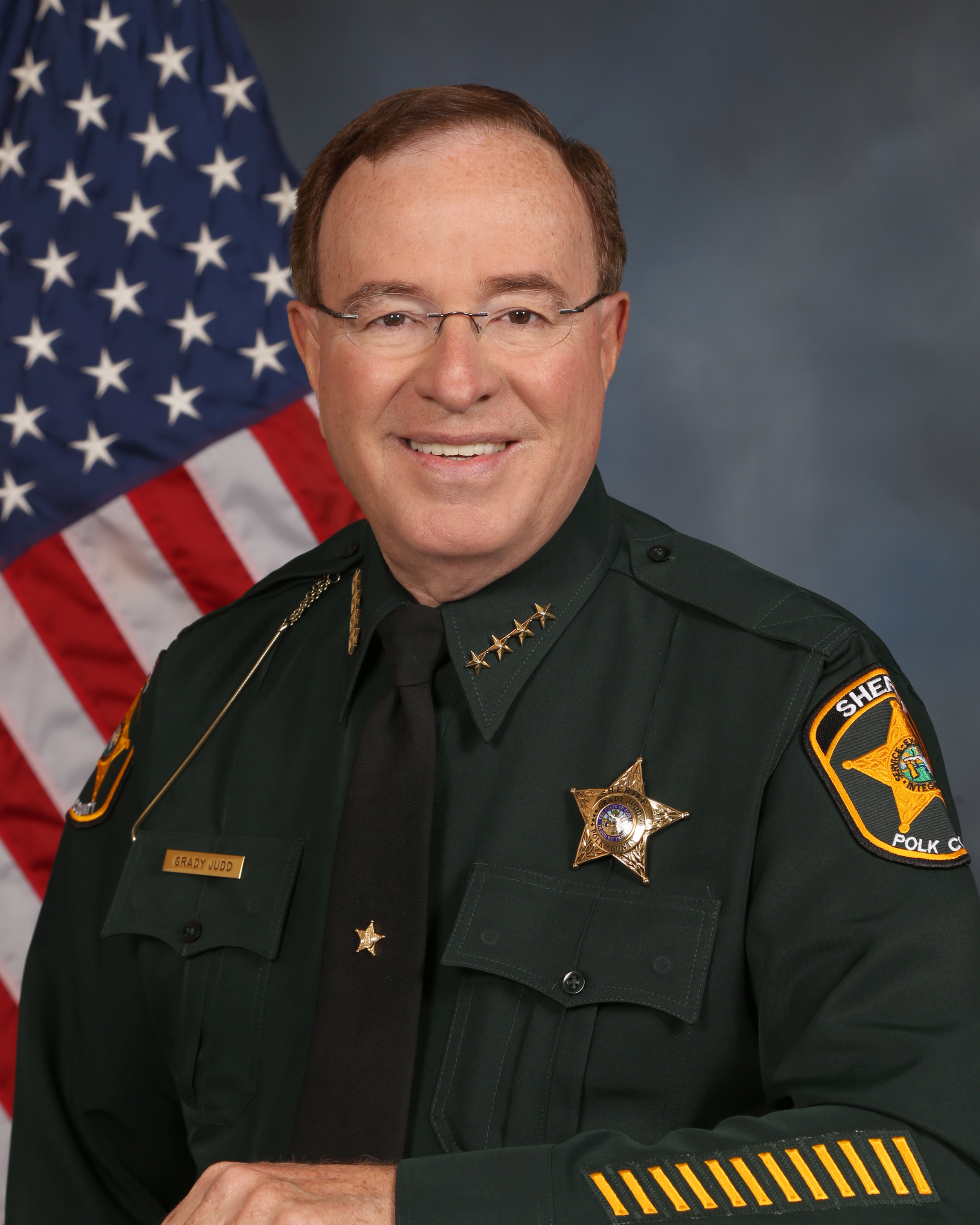
- Official portrait, 2021

Sheriff of Polk County
- Incumbent
- Assumed office January 4, 2005
- Preceded by: Lawrence W. Crow Jr.

Member of the Coordinating Council on Juvenile Justice and Delinquency Prevention
- In office December 23, 2020 – December 23, 2023
- Appointed by: Donald Trump

Personal details
- Born: Grady Curtis Judd Jr. March 10, 1954 (age 72) Lakeland, Florida, U.S.
- Party: Republican
- Spouse: Marisa Ogburn (m. 1972)
- Children: 2
- Education: Lakeland Senior High School
- Alma mater: Polk Community College (AS); Rollins College (BA, MS); FBI National Academy
- Occupation: Law enforcement officer; politician
- Police career
- Allegiance: Polk County
- Department: Polk County Sheriff's Office
- Service years: 1972–present
- Rank: Sheriff

Grady Curtis Judd Jr. (born March 10, 1954) is an American law enforcement officer serving as the sheriff of Polk County, Florida since 2005.

== Early life and education ==
Grady Curtis Judd Jr. was born in Lakeland, Florida, to Grady Judd Sr. (1931-2020) and Martha Judd (1927-2005). He earned bachelor's and master's degrees from Rollins College, and graduated from the FBI National Academy.

He married Marisa Ogburn in 1972, three months after graduating high school. They have 2 sons, Graham and Trae, and 13 grandchildren. A grandson, Graham Cleveland Judd Jr., died at birth in 2012.

== Career ==
In 1972, Judd started working for the Polk County Sheriff's Office (PCSO) as a dispatcher. As the first employee under the age of 21 in the department, he was required to get his father to purchase his ammunition. At age 27, he attained the rank of captain, supervising 44 employees, all of whom were older than he. He was elected as the sheriff of Polk County in 2004, and re-elected in 2008, 2012, and 2016.

In the 2020 election campaign, Judd ran unopposed. He was re-elected with over 80% of the vote in 2024 to a sixth term, becoming the first sheriff in Polk County to serve that many terms. Judd served as an adjunct professor at the University of South Florida and Florida Southern College.

Judd served as president of the Florida Sheriffs Association (2013–2014) and president of the Major County Sheriffs of America (2018–2019). He is a commissioner on the Marjory Stoneman Douglas High School Public Safety Commission. Judd has served as an active member and Paul Harris Fellow of the Bartow Rotary Club since 1994, and as a member of the board of directors for the club from 1996 until 1999.

Judd gained publicity as a sheriff with his "tell it how it is" demeanor. In 2006, after a traffic stop resulted in a deputy and his K-9 dog shot and killed, deputies shot and killed the suspect, shooting him 68 times. Asked by a reporter about the number of shots, Judd responded, "That's all the bullets we had, or we would have shot him more."

In 2020, Judd was appointed by U.S. president Donald Trump to serve a three-year term on the Coordinating Council on Juvenile Justice and Delinquency Prevention.

While the office of sheriff in Polk County is non-partisan, Judd frequently endorses Republican political candidates. In a 2022 news conference, Judd referred to Republican Florida governor Ron DeSantis as the "greatest governor in the United States of America."

In 2024, controversy emerged over allegations that PCSO detectives under his supervision dismissed reports of child sexual abuse, failing to take the victims’ claims seriously. Reports suggest that detectives, rather than investigating these claims thoroughly, accused some victims of lying, leading to charges against juveniles for false reporting while their alleged abusers remained free. Following additional evidence and further testimonies, some of these abusers have since been convicted, and sentences for lying have been overturned.

In October 2024, a PCSO detective received a letter of retraining over the handling of a child sexual abuse report and was ordered to complete online training regarding interviews and interrogations.

A lawsuit was filed in October 2025 against Judd and the Polk County police department after a child sexual abuse victim was allegedly made to claim that the allegations were false and apologize to her rapist who was later found guilty after she was returned to his care.

=== Undercover stings ===
In 2021, Judd led a six-month undercover investigation with the PCSO into drug sales on three LGBTQ dating apps: Grindr, Scruff, and Taimi, which led to 52 arrests.

In February 2024, Judd led an eight-day long undercover investigation with the PCSO into human trafficking, which resulted in 228 arrests.

In October 2024, Judd spearheaded a five-day long undercover investigation with the PCSO into human trafficking, which led to 157 arrests.

On 2 May 2026 Judd announced the results of wide-ranging, multi-day undercover investigation "Polk Around & Find Out": 266 arrests, 246 of which were related to prostitution and human trafficking; 19 suspects were charged with felonies such as traveling to meet a minor for sexual activity. One suspect, Ryan Yates, had pleaded guilty to breaching the U.S. Capitol, and another, self-described "MAGA influencer" Craig Long, had been photographed with Donald Trump and Donald Trump, Jr. (Judd prominently displayed the photograph at the press conference).

Judd has worked with To Catch a Predator host Chris Hansen on multiple stings to arrest predators suspected of soliciting minors for illegal activities.

== Elections ==
=== 2004 ===
Judd was elected Sheriff of Polk County in his first run for public office. Judd received 64% of the vote in a three-way non-partisan race, against attorney and former FBI special agent Kirk Warren (20%) and Polk deputy Pete Karashay (16%).

Judd was preceded in office by Lawrence W. Crow, Jr. who served 17 years as sheriff and declined to run in 2004. Crow was appointed by Governor Bob Martinez in 1987 and served until Judd was sworn into office.

=== 2008 ===
Judd was re-elected by defeating write-in candidate Michael Lashman. Judd received 96% of the vote. Lashman received just under 4%.

=== 2012 ===
Judd again faced write-in candidate Michael Lashman, a flooring contractor from Lakeland, in his third campaign for sheriff. Judd again won 96% of the vote, with 215,320 votes.

=== 2016 ===
Judd ran for a fourth term of office in 2016 and was elected with 95.27% of the vote, compared to 4.7% for write-in ballots.

2016 Polk County Sheriff general election
Party	Candidate	Votes	%	±%
No Party	Grady Judd	245,515	95.27%	
Write Ins		12,184	4.73%	
Turnout		257,699	100%	

=== 2020 ===
Judd ran for a fifth term of office in 2020 and was re-elected unopposed, making Judd the first sheriff in Polk’s 160-year history to be elected to five terms.

=== 2024 ===
Judd ran for a sixth term of office in 2024 and was re-elected with just over 83% of the vote, making Judd the first sheriff in the history of Polk County to be elected to six terms.

2024 Polk County Sheriff general election
Party	Candidate	Votes	%	±%
Republican	Grady Judd	283,542	83.76%	
NPA	Theodore Murray	54,973	16.24%	
Turnout		338,515	100%	
Republican hold				

== Professional affiliations ==
In 2013, Judd was elected president of the Florida Sheriffs Association. Prior to that, he served as chair for the FSA board of directors and held the positions of treasurer, secretary, and vice president. In 2018, Judd was sworn in as president of the Major County Sheriffs of America for a two-year term, and is now a member of the executive board as immediate past president.

== Awards ==
He has been awarded two honorary doctorates. Webber International University presented Judd with an honorary Doctorate of Business in 2015. Warner University presented him with an honorary Doctorate of Humane Studies in 2020.

In 2019, Judd was appointed by the National Sheriffs' Association to serve on the School Safety and Security Committee. In 2025, Judd was chosen as the chairman for the newly formed State Immigration Enforcement Council.
