= Miami-Dade Sheriff's Office =

County sheriff's office in Miami-Dade County, Florida, United States

Miami-Dade Sheriff’s Office
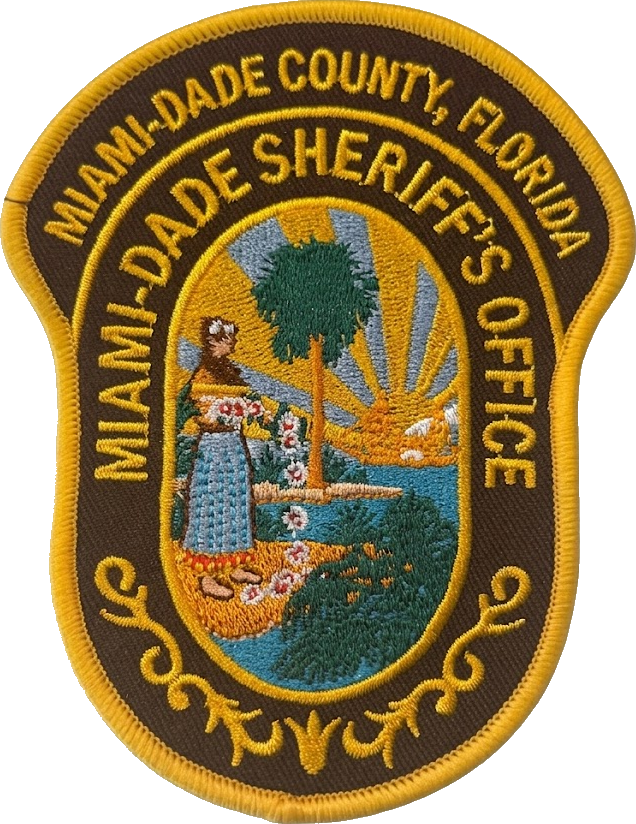
- Patch of the Miami-Dade Sheriff's Office

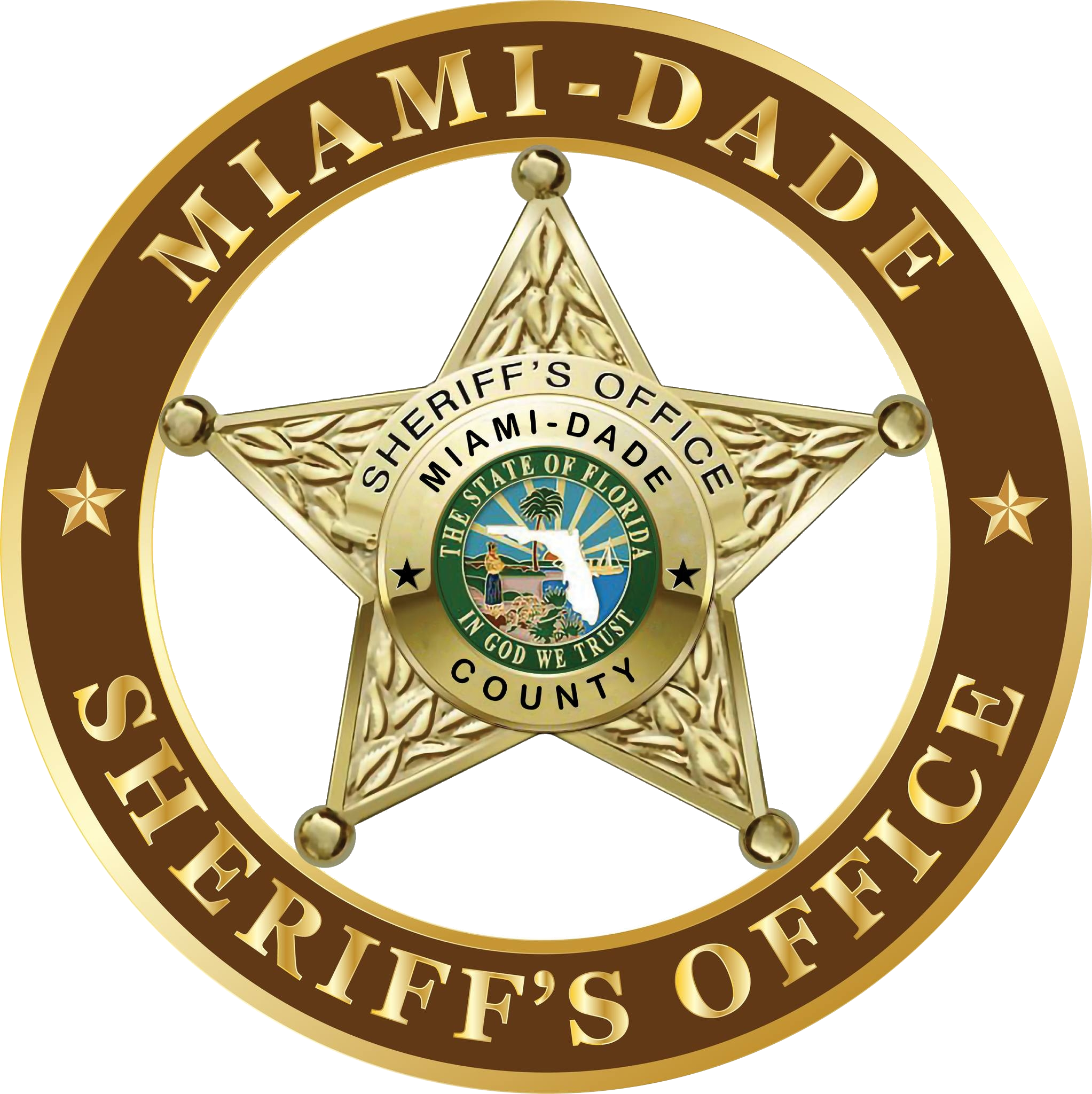
- Seal of the Miami-Dade Sheriff's Office

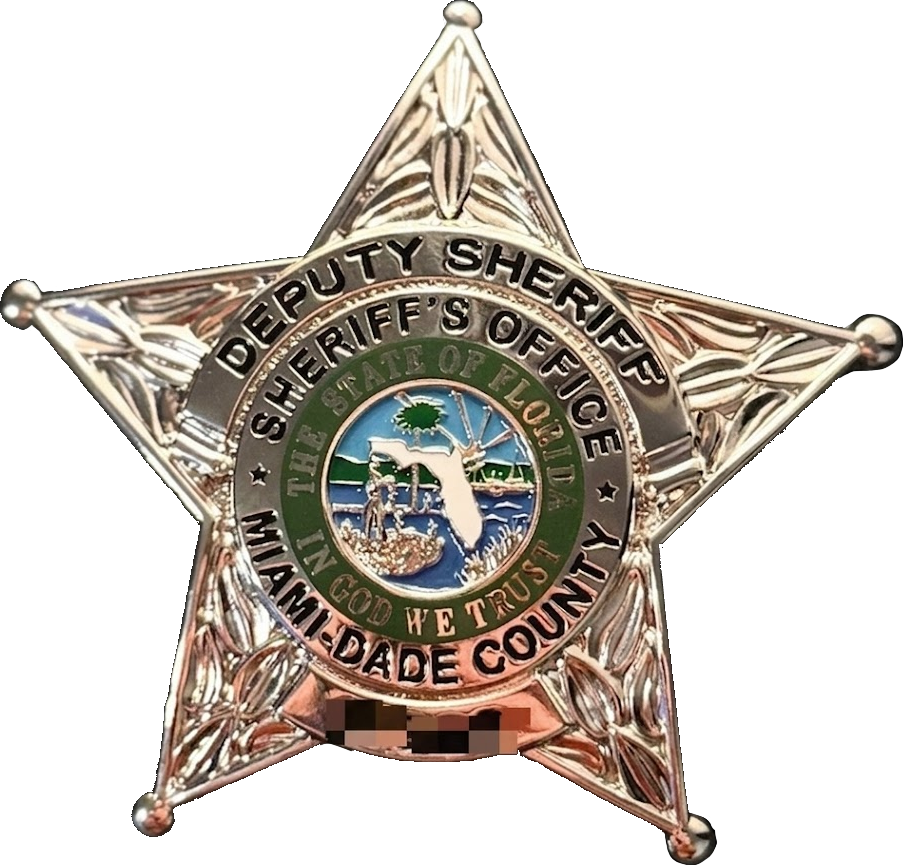
- Badge of an MDSO deputy
- Common name: Miami-Dade Sheriff’s Office, Miami-Dade Police, Metro-Dade Police
- Abbreviation: MDSO

Agency overview
- Formed: 1836; 190 years ago
- Employees: 4,900+

Jurisdictional structure
- Operations jurisdiction: Miami-Dade County, Florida, U.S.
- Area: 2,431 sq mi (6,300 km^{2})
- Population: 2,838,461
- General nature: Local civilian police

Operational structure
- Headquarters: 9105 NW 25th Street Doral, Florida, United States
- Deputies: Approximately 3,200
- Unsworn members: Approximately 1,700
- Agency executive: Rosie Cordero-Stutz, Sheriff

Facilities
- Stations: 8
- Patrol cars: 4,000+
- Boats: 6
- Airplanes: 2
- Helicopters: 4

Website
- miamidade.gov/police

The Miami-Dade Sheriff's Office (MDSO), formerly Miami-Dade Police Department (MDPD), is a law enforcement agency serving Miami-Dade County, Florida, United States. The MDSO is the largest sheriff's office in the southeastern United States and operates out of eight district stations throughout Miami-Dade County. The agency's three main responsibilities are to provide municipal police services within Miami-Dade County, courthouse security, and police operations at the Port of Miami and Miami International Airport. In addition to providing municipal police services to the unincorporated communities within Miami-Dade County, it has contractual arrangements to provide police services for three of the 34 independent cities within Miami-Dade County.

Unlike traditional Sheriff's offices, MDSO focuses primarily on law enforcement functions, while the Miami-Dade Corrections and Rehabilitation Department is responsible for operating the Miami-Dade County jail system. MDSO has several specialized bureaus and is internationally accredited by the Commission on Accreditation for Law Enforcement Agencies and by the Florida Commission for Law Enforcement Accreditation at the state level. MDSO's headquarters are located in Doral, Florida.

Miami-Dade Sheriff's deputies wear taupe/brown uniforms and the department is still often referred by its former names, Metro-Dade Police, Metro, or Miami-Dade Police. Their vehicles are green and white.

== History ==
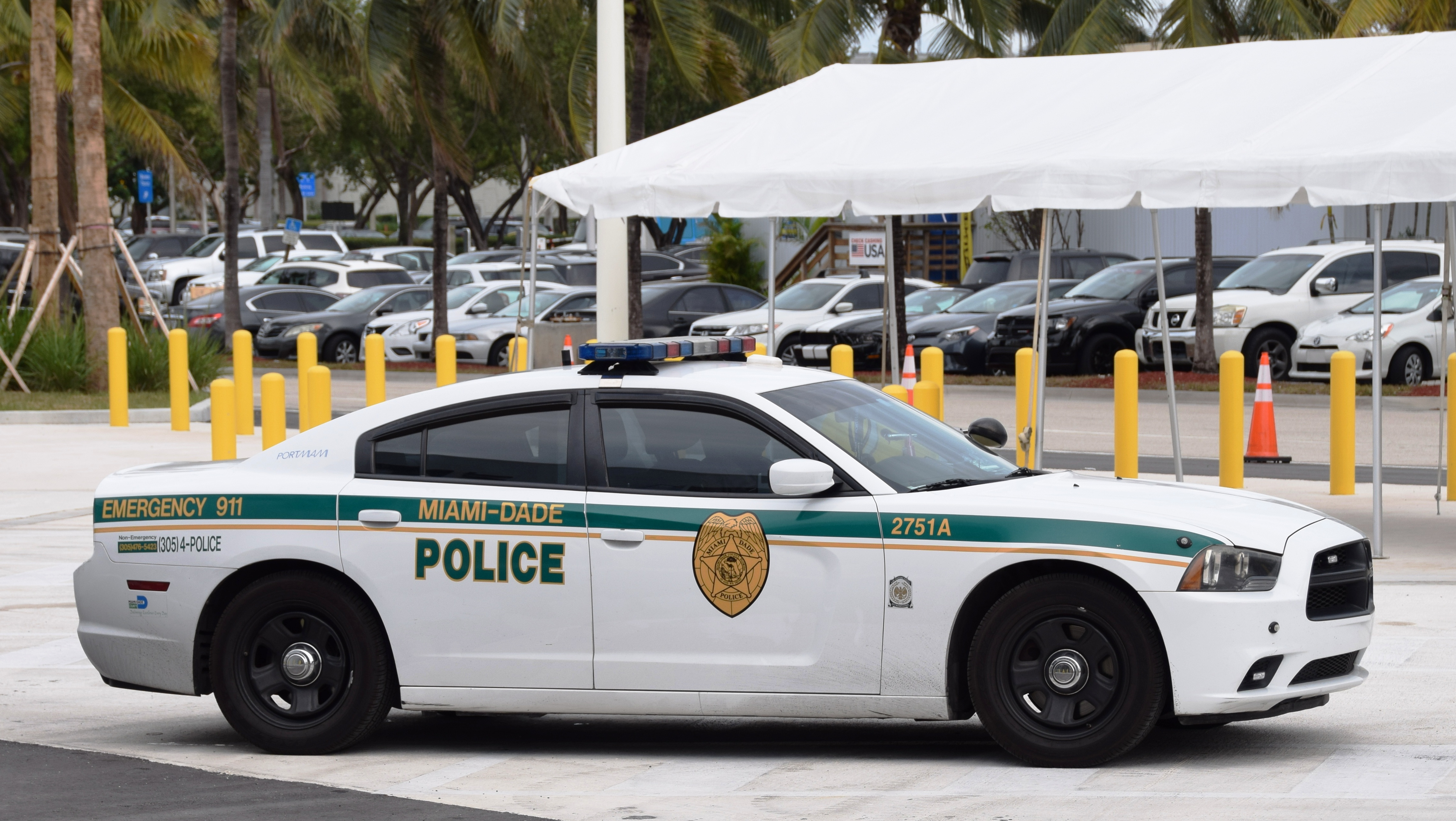
An MDPD Dodge Charger Pursuit parked outside Hard Rock Stadium.

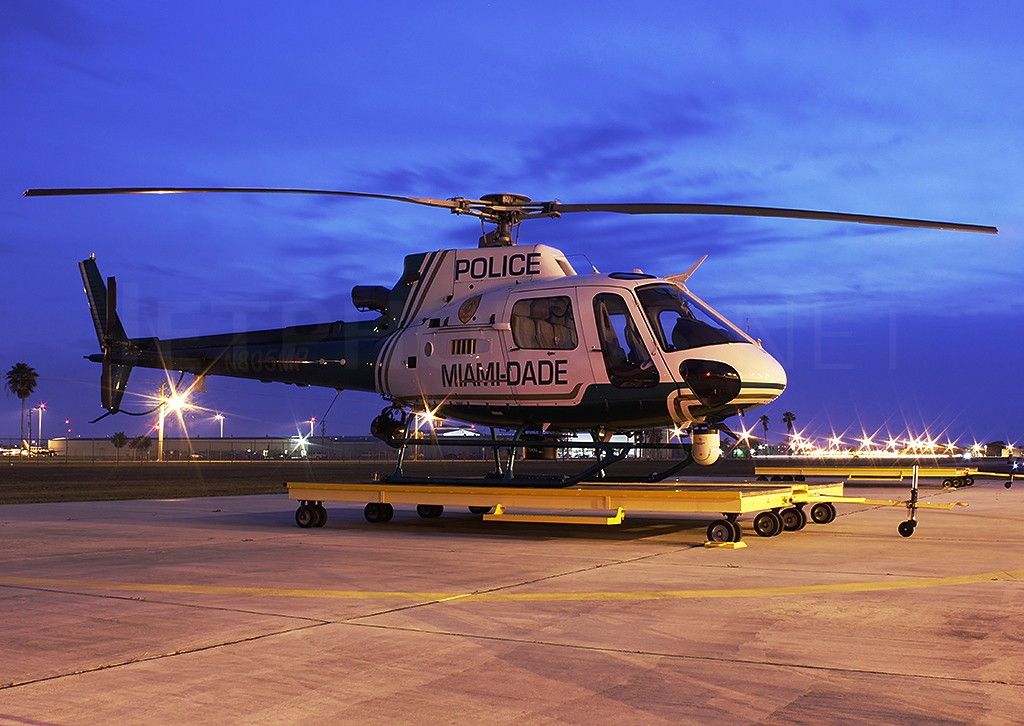
MDPD helicopter

The Dade County Sheriff's Office was created in 1836 to serve the newly created County of Dade, which originally consisted of the area comprising the present-day counties of Miami-Dade, Broward, Palm Beach and Martin. In the early years, the entire area was policed by as few as three deputies on horseback, and Dade's sheriffs were appointed by the governor. In 1899, the office of the sheriff became an elected position. By 1915, the jurisdiction area had been reduced to its present size of approximately 2,139 square miles.

In 1957, the metropolitan form of government was established, and the Dade County Sheriff's Office was subsequently renamed the Public Safety Department. The Public Safety Department's organizational structure, as determined by the metropolitan charter, included responsibility for police and fire protection, the jail and stockade, civil defense, animal control, and motor vehicle inspection. In 1960, the Public Safety Department also assumed responsibility for police operations at the Port of Miami and Miami International Airport. By 1966, the Public Safety Department had approximately 850 sworn officers in its ranks. That year, a long-standing controversy over the selection/election procedure for choosing a county sheriff was resolved by voter mandate. Subsequently, non-elected sheriffs were appointed by the county manager as "Director of the Public Safety Department and Sheriff of Metropolitan Dade County."

In June 1962, Thelma Gaitor Freeman Harris became the first African-American woman to serve as a police officer in Florida when she was hired by the Miami-Dade Police Department.

In 1973, the responsibility for running the county's jails was transferred to the newly created Department of Corrections and Rehabilitation. By that year, the Public Safety Department had also been divested of all other non-police responsibilities to concentrate entirely on law enforcement services. In July 1981, the Public Safety Department was renamed the Metro-Dade Police Department. In September 1997, voters decided to change the county's name to Miami-Dade County. As such, the department was renamed as the Miami-Dade Police Department the following December.

=== Transition to a sheriff's office ===
In 2018, Florida voters—including 58% of Miami-Dade voters—approved a constitutional amendment requiring every county in the state to elect a handful of "constitutional officers," including a sheriff.

MDSO Dodge Charger

On November 6, 2024, MDPD Assistant Director Rosie Cordero-Stutz became sheriff-elect after defeating Miami-Dade's Chief of Public Safety James Reyes. Cordero-Stutz assumed office on January 7, 2025. The transition to a Sheriff's Office is expected to be complete in 2028 per House Bill 1595.

=== Controversies and incidents ===
In August 1968, roughly coinciding with the Republican National Convention in Miami Beach, rioting broke out in Liberty City. Several civil rights organizations planned a protest to show frustration with the nation's unfair political, social, and economic systems. When the situation got out of control, Florida Highway Patrol and National Guard were dispatched. Claiming snipers were attacking them, the police killed three civilians. No one was injured by the sniper fire, and no weapons were found.

The 1980 Miami riots (also called the Arthur McDuffie riots) were race riots that occurred in Miami, Florida, United States, starting in earnest on May 18, 1980, following an all-White male jury acquitting five white Dade County Public Safety Department officers in the death of Arthur McDuffie (December 3, 1946 – December 21, 1979), a Black insurance salesman and United States Marine Corps lance corporal. McDuffie was beaten to death by four police officers after a traffic stop. After the officers were tried and acquitted on charges including manslaughter and evidence tampering, a riot broke out in the Black neighborhoods of Overtown and Liberty City on the night of May 17. Riots continued until May 20, resulting in at least 18 deaths and an estimated $100 million in property damage. In 1981 Dade County settled a civil lawsuit filed by McDuffie's family for $1.1 million. The 1980 Miami riots were the deadliest urban riots in a single city since the 1967 Detroit riot and remained such until the 1992 Los Angeles riots twelve years later.

On September 13, 2007, four Miami-Dade Police Department officers were shot by a suspect with an AK-47, resulting in the death of one officer, Jose Somohano. Another officer suffered a serious leg injury. The suspect, Shawn Sherwin Labeet, fled the scene but was found in an apartment complex later that day. He was cornered in the bathroom at a pool house by the Miami-Dade Police Special Response Team officers (equivalent to SWAT). He was shot and killed when he refused to drop the pistol that he was holding.

On the morning of Thursday, January 20, 2011, two Miami-Dade Police officers were shot and killed by a homicide suspect, Johnny Sims. According to Miami-Dade Police Department Chief James Loftus, the MDPD fugitive warrant team was assisting the U.S. Marshals Service at Miami in apprehending the suspect, for whom a murder warrant had been issued. Police arrived at the suspect's mother's house and made contact with a member of the family, when the suspect surprised police by opening fire. Detective Roger Castillo, a 21-year veteran, was shot in the head and died at the scene, and Detective Amanda Haworth, a 23-year veteran, was shot several times and taken to Jackson Memorial Hospital's Ryder Trauma Center in grave condition where she underwent emergency surgery there, but died shortly thereafter. The suspect, Sims, was shot and killed by another detective at the scene.

In December 2019, the Miami-Dade Police Department came under scrutiny after a shootout in Miramar. MDPD officers, as well as police officers from other law enforcement agencies, responded against the robbers who carjacked a United Parcel Service van and took the driver hostage. After a car chase, the MDPD killed the two suspects, the UPS driver, and an innocent bystander. The department received criticism for its officers' behavior, which included firing at open traffic and using civilian vehicles for cover. A total of 19 officers fired guns during the shootout, including 15 MDPD officers, 3 Miramar Police Department officers, and 1 Pembroke Pines Police Department officer.

== Line of duty deaths ==
Since 1836, 43 members of the MDSO have been killed in the line of duty. A permanent Law Enforcement Officer's memorial was established in 1980 to honor fallen officers.

== Organization ==
MDSO's Sheriff stations include:

1. Northwest District Station (Miami Lakes)
2. Northside District Station (West Little River)
3. Midwest District Station (Doral)
4. South District Station (Cutler Ridge)
5. Kendall District Station (Kendall)
6. Intracoastal District Station (North Miami Beach)
7. Airport District Station (Miami International Airport, Florida)
8. Hammocks District Station (The Hammocks)

MDSO's Contracted municipalities include:

- Town of Miami Lakes (1)
- Village of Palmetto Bay (4)
- Town of Cutler Bay (4)

== Demographics ==
Breakdown of the makeup of the rank and file of MDSO:

- Male: 75.58%
- Female: 24.42%
- White: 20.02%
- Hispanic: 58.11%
- African-American/Black: 20.58%
- Other: 1.29%

== Ranks and insignia ==
Title	Insignia
Sheriff	
Undersheriff	
Assistant Sheriff	
Division Chief	
Major	
Captain	
Lieutenant	
Sergeant	
Deputy Sheriff/Detective	

All insignias and ranks are worn on the collars of the shirt, except for sergeant, which is worn on each sleeve, below the department patch.

== Specialized units ==
- Arson Unit
- Auto Theft Unit
- Aviation Unit
- Bomb Squad
- Bicycle Response Team
- Cargo Theft Task Force
- Citizens Volunteer Program
- Court Services Bureau
- Communications Bureau
- Crime Stoppers – (305) 471-TIPS
- Drug Abuse Resistance Education
- Economic Crimes Bureau
- Environmental Crimes Unit
- Forensic Services Bureau
- General Investigations Unit (G.I.U.)
- Homeland Security Bureau
- Homicide Bureau
- Information Technology Services Division (ITSD)
- K9 Unit
- Marine Patrol
- Mounted Patrol
- Motors Traffic Unit
- Miami-Dade Public Safety Training Institute
- Narcotics Bureau
- Neighborhood Resource Unit (N.R.U.)
- Organized Crime Section
- Professional Compliance Bureau
- Public Information and Education Bureau
- Personnel Management Bureau
- Police Legal Bureau
- Property and Evidence Section
- Public Corruption and Criminal Conspiracy Unit
- Rapid Deployment Force
- Robbery Bureau
- Robbery Intervention Detail (RID)
- Street Terror Offender Program (S.T.O.P.)
- Special Patrol Bureau (Motorcycle, D.U.I. Certified)
- Special Response Team (S.R.T.)
- Special Victims Bureau (Sexual Battery & Domestic Crimes)
- Strategic Policing Operations Response Team (SPORT)
- Southeast Regional Domestic Security Task Force
- Underwater Recovery Unit
- Warrants Bureau (assists U.S. Marshal Service)

== Popular culture ==
The department has been depicted in a number of television shows, films, and video games:

- CSI Miami
- Miami Vice
- Bad Boys as Miami Metro Police
- Dexter as Miami Metro Police
- Burn Notice
- Grand Theft Auto: Vice City and Grand Theft Auto: Vice City Stories. Parodied as the Vice City Police Department.
- Grand Theft Auto VI, now referred to as the Vice-Dale Police Department
- Ace Ventura: Pet Detective as South Dade Police
- Cocaine Cowboys
- Miami SWAT
- Casino Royale
- Driv3r
- Pain & Gain
- Kung Fury
- Jane the Virgin
- Super Fuzz
- Newton's Cradle ("لعبة نيوتن")
- The Crew
- Call of Duty Black Ops Cold War
- Ace Combat Assault Horizon
- The Rip

== See also ==
- List of U.S. state and local law enforcement agencies
- Sheriff (Florida)
- Florida Highway Patrol
- United States Border Patrol
- Miami-Dade Fire Rescue Department
