= Morris A. Young =

American law enforcement officer and politician

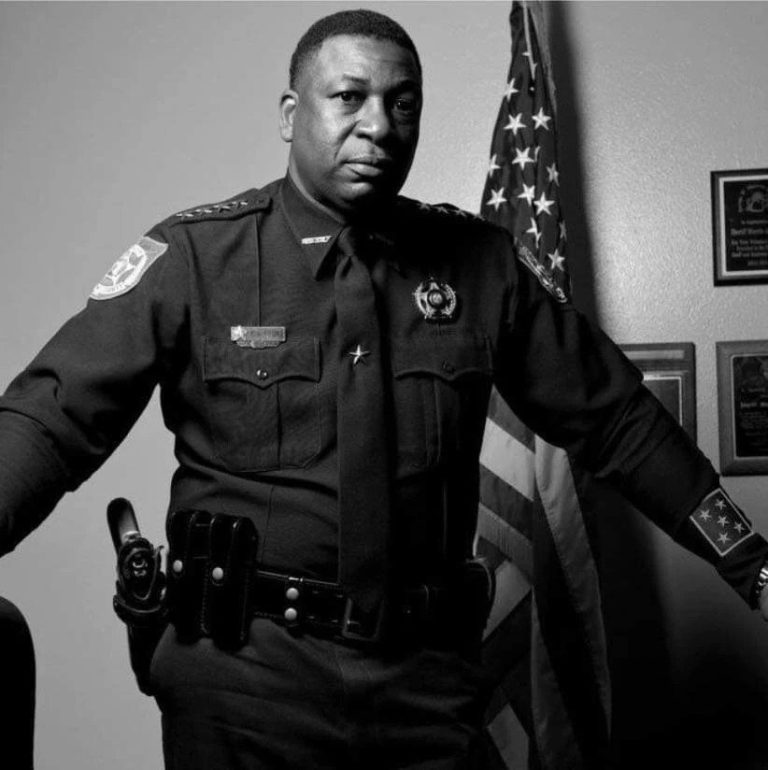

Sheriff of Gadsden County
- Incumbent
- Assumed office November 2004
- Preceded by: W. A. Woodham

Personal details
- Party: Independent (Note: Young is a registered Democrat, however, has run for office as an independent. County sheriff's in Florida are officially elected in partisan elections.); Democratic
- Relatives: Jonathan Ferrell (cousin)
- Education: James A. Shanks High School
- Alma mater: Chipola College
- Occupation: Law enforcement officer
- Website: gadsdensheriff.org
- Police career
- Allegiance: Quincy, Florida; Gadsden County
- Department: Quincy Police Department; Gadsden County Sheriff's Office
- Service years: 1988–1999; 1999–present
- Rank: Sheriff

Morris A. Young is an American law enforcement officer and politician who has served as the sheriff of Gadsden County, Florida since 2004. Upon assuming office, Young became the second black sheriff in Florida history and, as of 2026, is the longest-serving African American sheriff in Florida.

== Life and career ==
Morris A. Young attended James A. Shanks High School and the Institute of Police Technology and Management at Chipola College. Young is a member of the National Sheriffs’ Association.

Young regularly participates in Gadsden County's 34 mi (55 km) annual breast cancer awareness walk, which lasts 12 hours and crosses Gadsden county.

== Law enforcement ==
Young was a part of the Quincy Police Department for 11 years, where he served as a patrolman, a patrol sergeant and as a member of the narcotics task force. In 1999, Young began working for the Sheriff's Office as a school-resource officer and also worked on patrol and investigations.

=== Sheriff of Gadsden County ===
Young ran for sheriff of Gadsden County in 2000 and lost to incumbent Sheriff W. A. Woodham, who had held the office since 1971. Young ran again after Woodham retired, and became the sheriff of Gadsden County in 2004, making him the second black sheriff in Florida history, the first having served during Reconstruction, and the first black sheriff in Gadsden county, a majority African American county. He soon hired Chaplain Jimmy Salters to help create a reintegration program in the Gadsden County Jail which involves the larger church community and is based on faith, including the baptism of willing inmates. Young has said he believes that it's important to appeal to the spiritual side of offenders, as opposed to focusing on purely punitive actions that lock away inmates for long periods of time without any type of help to prevent recidivism. Under his watch, Judge Kathy L. Garner, the county's first black female judge, hears all juvenile cases in her jurisdiction.

Having run unopposed in 2008, Young was re-elected in 2012, with 89 percent of the vote. He was re-elected again in 2016.

In 2018, Young worked to train churches on how to respond to active shooters after a shooting occurred at a Texas church.

In April 2020, Young was appointed to represent Gadsden on Governor Ron DeSantis' "Task Force to Reopen Florida" during the COVID-19 pandemic.

In March 2025, Young endorsed incumbent Republican Senator Ashley Moody in the 2026 U.S. Senate special election in Florida.

=== Furlough program court case ===
In 2014, State Attorney Willie Meggs forced Young to appear in front of 3rd Circuit Senior Judge Julian Collins, who found him guilty of indirect criminal contempt due to a program that allowed furloughs for inmates. The furlough program had been running for 32 years and allowed some inmates to leave custody, typically with an escort, for predetermined short periods of time up to 8 hours. During the case, former Monroe County Sheriff Allison DeFoor, and current Liberty County Sheriff Nick Finch, who served nearby counties in northern Florida, also testified they had granted similar furloughs in their position as Sheriff. Young was fined $500 and given a second-degree misdemeanor for allowing the furloughs to happen. Young has claimed the charge was politically motivated because, in addition to furloughs regularly being granted in nearby counties, the previous Sheriff W. A. Woodham had also granted furloughs. Young also pointed out that there were no state laws prohibiting furlough programs, and there were no court orders prohibiting furloughs for any of the cases cited.

=== Media profiles ===
In 2016, The New York Times profiled his work, and discussed how his programs have reduced crime and recidivism rates in Gadsden County.

In July 2018, he was featured in The Guardian as a "radical sheriff giving offenders a chance." The Guardian highlighted that since Young became sheriff in 2004, crime in Gadsden was about half of what it was when he obtained office, with juvenile arrests down by over 75%, and Gadsden county was sending 65% fewer inmates to state prison. Young credits daily coaching programs for children with incarcerated parents, helping inmates gain job skills, helping find employment opportunities for people after they've served time, and asking officials and deputies to focus on serious or violent crimes as opposed to locking people up for long periods due to drug possession or other low level offenses. He also worked with the local school superintendent, Reginald C. James, to establish an alternative school for children who are running into trouble with the law, which increased local graduation rates from 40% to 65% in 2016.
