= Columbia College (Alberta) =

Education institution in Canada

Columbia College is a vocational education institution located in Calgary, Canada, offering certificate and diploma qualifications in a range of subjects. Government-funded scholarships are offered to students without the means to pay the fees.

== History ==
Established in the late 1980s, the college was originally known as "Columbia Institute of Canada". Founded by Tom and Nola Snell the school opened with a small range of programs primarily aimed at helping local disabled individuals sustain employment and upgrade their existing education. Over the years the College has expanded its programs to include a variety of professional programs in addition to its roots in Academic Upgrading and English as a second language.

== College diplomas ==
Columbia offers both one-year certificate programs and two-year diploma programs. Some two-year academic diplomas can be completed in as few as 12 calendar months.

== Accelerated education ==
Columbia College provides accelerated adult education programs. Students can complete up to one academic year of post-secondary education during every six months they attend Columbia College.

== Columbia Learning Society ==
In 1998 the College created The Columbia Learning Society to raise money in order to provide scholarships to learners in financial need who wish to attend the College. The society received authority from the Canadian government in the winter of 2002 to issue tax deductible receipts for donations. Columbia College continues to make a substantial donation each year to the society, enabling it to hire staff and offer educational scholarships for free courses to adult learners in need. The society also offers educational scholarships for free weekend tutoring sessions to young children. Since 2002 the society has provided scholarships (valued at $240,000) to over 1,100 learners.
