= Daytona Beach Police Department =

American police department

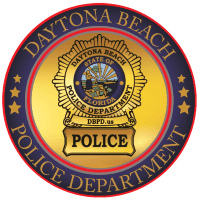
- Daytona Beach Police Department Insignia

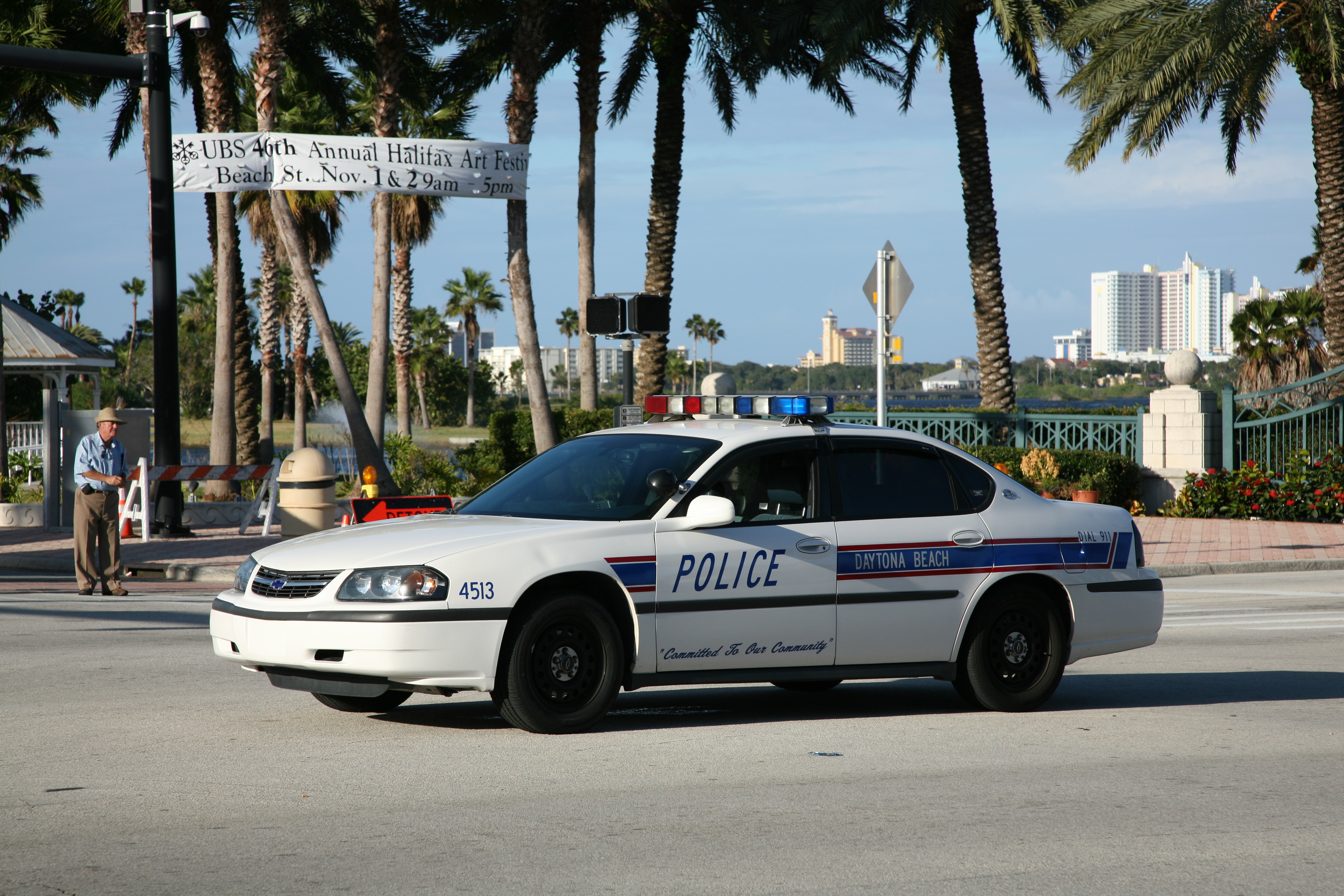
- DBPD police cruiser
- Abbreviation: DBPD

Agency overview
- Formed: 1926

Jurisdictional structure
- Operations jurisdiction: Daytona Beach, Florida, United States
- General nature: Local civilian police

Operational structure
- Headquarters: 129 Valor Blvd.
- Agency executive: Jakari Young, Chief

Facilities
- Stations: 3

Website
- Daytona Beach Police Department

The Daytona Beach Police Department (DBPD) is the primary law enforcement agency for Daytona Beach, Florida. Its current chief of police is Jakari Young.

The main headquarters is located at 129 Valor Blvd. In January 2009, the former location at 990 Orange Ave was closed due to age (built in 1957 with additions in 1964 and 1971, and renovations in 1978) and its small size. Shortly after closing, in May 2009 the old headquarters was flooded along with large areas of the city after historic rains inundated Daytona. The former headquarters was demolished in late 2017 after a lengthy asbestos remediation process. The department has two districts, District One is stationed out of the main headquarters, District two uses two substations, the Beach Side Precinct is located at the corner of Harvey and Wild Olive Avenues, the other, Grandview Substation, is located at the corner of Grandview and Glenview Avenues. Both District Two substations are located on the "Beach Side" of Daytona Beach.

== Scumbag Eradication Team ==
"Scumbag Eradication Team: Not in our Town!" are the words printed on a T-shirt used to raise money for the Daytona Beach Police Explorers Unit 22, a program which helps to mentor teenagers age 14–19 who are interested in a career in law enforcement.

The T-shirts feature the words "Scumbag Eradication Team" and "Not In Our Town" with a caricature of former police chief Mike Chitwood, who served 17 years with the Philadelphia Police Department, and a toilet full of what are assumed to be "scumbags". According to the DBPD website, "The purpose of the Daytona Beach Police Explorers Unit 22 is to assist the development of character in young people."

Scumbag Eradication Team logo on T-shirts sold by the DBPD

Chitwood stated that the individuals he characterized as "scumbags" not only erode the quality of life in Daytona Beach but they also ruin its "fabric", saying "It's the scumbags like this that erode the quality of life and the fabric that we have here."

Prolific use of the word "scumbag" in public, as well as printing T-shirts which make prominent use of the word scumbag is a family tradition started in Pennsylvania by Chitwood's father, Mike Chitwood Sr., also a former officer of the Philadelphia Police. The elder Chitwood, later police chief of Upper Darby Township, Pennsylvania, printed "Not in My Town, Scumbag" on his shirts.

== Investigations against serial killer ==
Four homicides that occurred in December 2005, January 2006, February 2006 and December 2007 were linked to a single offender. A fifth unsolved death that occurred in October 2006 may have also been committed by the same offender.

In 2019, Robert Hayes was charged under suspicion of being the Daytona Beach Killer. In 2022, he was convicted and sentenced to life in prison.

== Controversies ==
Former police chief Michael Chitwood has been known for his brash language. In one incident, Chitwood referred to Volusia County Sheriff Ben Johnson as a "moron" during a public meeting. Ben Johnson said through a spokesman he would not dignify Chitwood's insult with a comment.

In 2012, patrol supervisor Jim Newcomb was promoted to the position of Captain. This promotion was met objections from the police union over his controversial past, which includes the wrongful firing of a lesbian officer and year-long harassment of another female officer.

On December 20, 2007, Daytona Beach police officer Claudia Wright tasered Best Buy customer Elizabeth Beeland in front of a store full of customers. A store clerk had called police thinking Beeland was using a stolen credit card, which turned out not to be the case. Beeland was backing away from Wright when she was tasered. Police Chief Mike Chitwood defended his officer's actions. Wright was also investigated for interfering in a narcotics investigation in 2009. Wright was arrested in 2010 on three felony charges for fraud and forgery for allegedly defrauding her own grandmother.

After a heavily publicized incident on the campus of the historically black Bethune–Cookman University, in which DBPD Chief Chitwood was alleged to have made racist comments, the NAACP asked the US Attorney General, Eric Holder, to probe Chitwood’s "racially tinged" comments about the disturbance. A recent spate of murders in the black community, including the death of a 13-year-old boy who was shot in the face, have led some to blame the DBPD's moving the police headquarters from Orange Avenue, in the black community, to Valor Boulevard, in a culturally-mixed suburban area of Daytona Beach. When asked about the possibility of placing a police substation in the area, Chitwood responded that substations were "a monument for cops to sit on their ass and don’t do anything".

Lt. Major Garvin was fired after accusations of harassing employees of a local Starbucks. The officer agreed to take a polygraph, and the results tested negative. Garvin was fired for this incident, and then subsequently rehired based on an arbitrators ruling that the investigation into his behavior was "shoddy". He was involved in another incident in May 2010, involving parking his unmarked patrol car in a handicapped parking space at Disney's Wide World of Sports complex in Osceola County.

== Officer deaths ==
Eight DBPD officers have been killed in the line of duty, five by gunfire, three by vehicular assault. In September 1998, police officer Kevin John Fischer, a motorcycle officer, was struck and killed by a pick-up truck on I-95, while aiding in an accident investigation of a prior incident. In 2021, officer Jason Raynor died from a gun wound to the head.

== See also ==
- Fourth Amendment to the United States Constitution
- Mike Chitwood
