= Killing of Jonathan Ferrell =

2013 death via police officer

- Date: September 14, 2013
- Location: Charlotte, North Carolina, U.S.
- Type: Homicide by shooting, police killing
- Deaths: Jonathan Ferrell
- Accused: Randall Kerrick
- Charges: Voluntary manslaughter
- Verdict: Hung jury, case will not be retried by Roy Cooper
- Litigation: Ferrell's family filed a lawsuit against the City of Charlotte; settled for $2.25 million

Jonathan Ferrell
- Born: October 11, 1988
- Died: September 14, 2013 (aged 24); Bradfield Farms, Charlotte, North Carolina
- Cause of death: Gunshot wounds
- Education: Florida A&M University
- Occupation: Former football scholarship player for the Florida A&M Rattlers
- Relatives: Morris A. Young (cousin)

On September 14, 2013, Jonathan Ferrell (born October 11, 1988), a 24-year-old former college football player for the Florida A&M University Rattlers was involved in a car crash. When police arrived, he ran towards them and was shot by police officer Randall "Wes" Kerrick in Charlotte, North Carolina, United States. Kerrick was charged with voluntary manslaughter, but the jury deadlocked and he was not retried. Police dashcam footage of the incident was released to the public.

== Shooting ==
Ferrell, a black man, was unarmed at the time he was shot. While giving a co-worker a lift home on the night of September 14, 2013, he crashed his car. Witnesses testified that Ferrell walked to the nearby home of Sarah McCartney after the accident and pounded on the door seeking help. McCartney thought Ferrell was trying to break in and called 911. Three officers came.

Ferrell then ran towards them, whereupon one of the officers, Thornel Little, fired a taser at Ferrell and missed. Little testified that Ferrell had said "shoot me" twice as he ran up on the officers. Kerrick then opened fire on Ferrell, shooting him twelve times and killing him, fearing that the subject had a weapon or was otherwise displaying opportunity, capability, and intent to seriously harm Kerrick and his fellow officers.

A toxicology test of Ferrell's blood showed a blood alcohol level within the legal limit for driving.

== Legal proceedings ==
The day following the shooting, Officer Randall "Wes" Kerrick was charged with voluntary manslaughter, and was released on $45,000 bail from jail. On January 21, 2014, a grand jury declined to indict Kerrick with voluntary manslaughter. On January 27, a second grand jury did indict Kerrick on a voluntary manslaughter charge. On August 21, 2015, a 26th District judge declared a mistrial in the case after the jury reached a deadlock, with eight jurors on one side and four on the other. The Attorney General of North Carolina, Roy Cooper, said that the state would not re-try Kerrick.

On May 14, 2015, the city of Charlotte settled a separate lawsuit with Ferrell's family for $2.25 million.

=== Reaction ===
Ferrell's cousin, Morris A. Young (Sheriff of Gadsden County, Florida), said of the incident that Ferrell had always been on the right track and was only looking for help after getting into a traffic collision late at night, yet "the next thing you know, law enforcement comes and sees a young black male at night in that neighborhood. And sometimes people react to that."

On August 21, 2015, after the mistrial declaration, protesters took to the streets of Charlotte. Several areas of the city were shut down as a result, and two people were arrested.

On October 2, 2015, Kerrick resigned from the police force.

== See also ==
- List of unarmed African Americans killed by law enforcement officers in the United States
- Shooting of Keith Lamont Scott
