= Mike Chitwood =

American sheriff (born 1963)

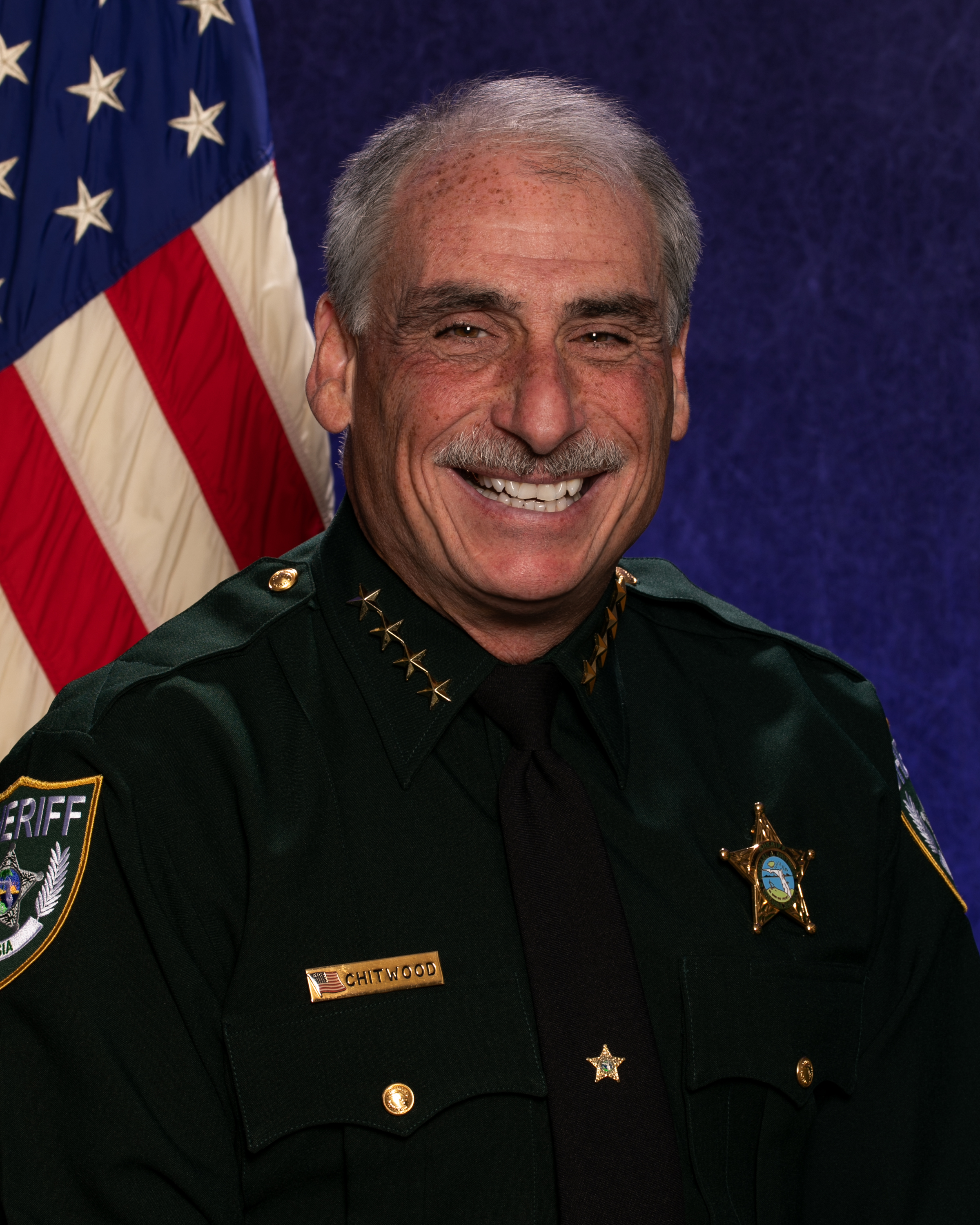
- Official portrait, c. 2017

27th Sheriff of Volusia County
- Incumbent
- Assumed office January 1, 2017
- Preceded by: Ben Johnson

Chief of the Daytona Beach Police Department
- In office May 30, 2006 – November 11, 2016
- Preceded by: Dennis Jones
- Succeeded by: Craig Capri

Chief of the Shawnee, Oklahoma Police Department
- In office May 1, 2005 – May 23, 2006

Personal details
- Born: Michael Jude Chitwood; November 30, 1963 (age 62) Philadelphia, Pennsylvania, U.S.
- Party: Independent (since 2020)
- Other political affiliations: Republican (2011–2020); Democratic (before 2011)
- Spouse: Jane Chitwood (divorced)
- Children: 3
- Education: Eastern University (BA); Nova Southeastern University (MCJ)
- Occupation: Politician; law enforcement officer
- Police career
- Allegiance: Philadelphia
- Department: Philadelphia Police Department
- Service years: 1988–2005
- Rank: Lieutenant

Michael Jude Chitwood (born November 30, 1963) is an American politician and law enforcement officer who currently serves as the sheriff of Volusia County, Florida. He previously served as chief of police of the Daytona Beach Police Department from 2006 to 2016 and as chief of police of the Shawnee, Oklahoma, Police Department from 2005 to 2006. Chitwood is currently a registered independent.

As Daytona Beach chief of police, Chitwood faced a heavily publicized incident on the campus of the historically black Bethune–Cookman University, in which he was alleged to have made racist comments. The NAACP asked United States attorney general Eric Holder to probe Chitwood's "racially tinged" comments about the disturbance. In 2016, he was elected Volusia County sheriff. Since assuming office, Chitwood has maintained many public feuds with state prosecutors, judges, and politicians. In 2019, Chitwood was reprimanded by Seventh Judicial Circuit Court chief judge Raul Zambrano for interfering with the judiciary and baselessly smearing circuit court judge Michael Hutcheson. During the COVID-19 pandemic, Chitwood strongly advocated vaccine mandates. Chitwood left the Republican Party in 2020 and disavowed Donald Trump after the January 6 United States Capitol attack.

== Early life and education ==
Chitwood was born on November 30, 1963 in Philadelphia, Pennsylvania. He is the son of Elizabeth Chitwood and Michael Chitwood Sr, a decorated law-enforcement officer who served as police chief in Middletown, Pennsylvania, then Portland, Maine, and as police superintendent in Upper Darby, Pennsylvania. Chitwood Jr grew up in an upper middle class household in Pennsylvania. He received a Bachelor of Organizational Management from Eastern University in 2005 and a Master of Criminal Justice from Nova Southeastern University in 2008.

== Career ==
Chitwood served in the Philadelphia Police Department from 1988 to 2005, attaining the rank of lieutenant. He worked patrol and then narcotics before becoming a detective. He then served as chief of police of the Shawnee, Oklahoma, Police Department from 2005 to 2006.

=== Daytona Beach Police Department ===
Chitwood joined the Daytona Beach Police Department as police chief in 2006, where he worked for ten years until he resigned in November 2016. He had a deeply controversial tenure while leading the department. He was succeeded as chief of police by Deputy Chief Craig Capri.

==== Controversies ====
Chitwood's tenure as police chief was continually mired in controversy. In one incident, Chitwood referred to Volusia County sheriff Ben Johnson as a "moron" during a public meeting. Sheriff Johnson said through a spokesman he would not dignify Chitwood's insult with a comment.

On December 20, 2007, Daytona Beach police officer Claudia Wright tasered Best Buy customer Elizabeth Beeland in front of a store full of customers. A store clerk had called police thinking Beeland was using a stolen credit card, which turned out not to be the case. Beeland was backing away from Wright when she was tasered. Police Chief Mike Chitwood defended his officer's actions. Wright was also investigated for interfering in a narcotics investigation in 2009. Wright was arrested in 2010 on three felony charges for fraud and forgery for allegedly defrauding her own grandmother.

In 2012, patrol supervisor Jim Newcomb was promoted to the position of captain. This promotion was met with objections from the police union over his controversial past, which includes the wrongful firing of a lesbian officer and year-long harassment of another female officer.

After a heavily publicized incident on the campus of the historically black Bethune–Cookman University, in which DBPD chief Chitwood was alleged to have made racist comments, the NAACP asked US attorney general Eric Holder to probe Chitwood’s "racially tinged" comments about the disturbance. A recent spate of murders in the black community, including the death of a 13-year-old boy who was shot in the face, have led some to blame the DBPD's moving the police headquarters from Orange Avenue, in the black community, to Valor Boulevard, in a culturally-mixed suburban area of Daytona Beach. When asked about the possibility of placing a police substation in the area, Chitwood responded that substations were "a monument for cops to sit on their ass and don’t do anything".

== Sheriff of Volusia County ==
In January 2016, incumbent Volusia County sheriff Ben Johnson announced his retirement at the end of his current term. Chitwood immediately announced that he would run for sheriff. Then he said he wouldn't, pledging to remain as police chief. Then, on March 14, he announced his candidacy, again. In August 2016, Chitwood narrowly defeated former Pasco County sheriff James E. Gillum and three others in the Republican primary for Volusia County sheriff. As there was no Democratic challenger, Chitwood became Sheriff-elect until assuming office on January 1, 2017. He was re-elected unopposed to a second term in 2020. During the COVID-19 pandemic, Chitwood strongly advocated vaccine mandates. He also gave additional days off to deputies who were vaccinated.

Chitwood was re-elected to a third term in 2024, defeating Republican opponent James Powers. The Volusia County Republican Party did not support Powers due to his criminal record.

=== Controversies ===
After the state-wide referendum, Amendment 10, the Volusia County Council voted 6-1 to stay the amendment temporarily. Chitwood, a leading proponent of Amendment 10, called the councilmembers "scumbags" and accused them of corruption. He allegedly contacted the FBI about his concerns, however, Chitwood refused to provide any details and the FBI did not confirm the meeting occurred.

In 2021, Chitwood established his own training academy for recruits of the Volusia County Sheriff's Office, rather than sending them to the state training academy all other recruits in Florida attend.

In 2024, Chitwood received national attention for perp walking and posting mugshots of children who had been arrested for making school shooting threats. His actions were characterized by Kelly McBride of the Poynter Institute as "vindictive" and a "publicity stunt harmful to children". In 2025, a man was arrested for threatening Chitwood’s life in response to the shaming of the arrested juveniles.

Chitwood endorsed auto salesman Randy Dye, father of stock car racing driver Daniel Dye, for Volusia County Council chair in 2024. In November 2024, incumbent Volusia County chair Jeff Brower accused Chitwood of being a "bully" and called for "a new sheriff". In response Chitwood called Brower "feckless [and] ineffective". Brower defeated Dye in the general election despite being significantly outspent in the campaign.

=== Notable events ===
In 2017, Chitwood began implementing reformist measures to reduce the size and scope of law enforcement in Volusia County. Since then, he implemented classes on gender and racial bias in policing. He also de-emphasized weapon proficiency in the training of new recruits.

In 2020, Chitwood implemented a crisis intervention training for new officers in Volusia County with the goal of decreasing use-of-force and eliminating the "warrior mentality" in police operations. The project was influenced by the Obama Foundation affiliated, Scottish police reform group; Police Executive Research Forum (PERF). In the same period, he equipped detectives and the SWAT team of Volusia County with body cameras while drastically increasing the use of SWAT, leading to what many consider the militarization of police.

Early in 2023, anti-Jewish banners were held by neo-Nazi group Goyim Defense League at the Daytona International Speedway. Chitwood responded to the group at press conferences and on social media. Anonymous death threats were made against Chitwood on 4chan. Police agencies opened an investigation resulting in the arrests of three people outside the state of Florida, one of whom was in possession of firearms and ammunition. In late 2023, an Alaskan double-murder suspect was indicted by a grand jury after allegedly threatening to "blind and kill" Chitwood. In total, six men were arrested in 2023 over alleged threats directed at the sheriff.

Chitwood often personally confronts face-to-face arrested individuals extradited to Florida while they are being escorted through the Orlando Sanford International Airport, including several of the men that made threats against him, a con artist who stole an elderly woman's life savings, and a woman involved in a $52,000 Facebook Marketplace scam.

== Political views ==
Chitwood is a registered Independent. He voted for Donald Trump in the 2016 and 2020 United States presidential elections. Chitwood disavowed President Trump as a "con man" after the January 6 United States Capitol attack and condemned Republican voters still supportive of Trump.

Chitwood has made positive remarks about Black Lives Matter and has been supportive of the Blue Lives Matter movement. He has been endorsed by the NRA Political Victory Fund and the National Association for the Advancement of Colored People, though he had a falling out with both organizations since the endorsements. Chitwood has been described as "pro-immigrant" and "pro-gun" by PBS. However, he has under various public safety laws seized firearms from residents throughout his career.

== Personal life ==
Chitwood was married to his then-wife Jane. They had three daughters before they divorced. She died in September 2016. Chitwood lives in Port Orange, Florida, and is a non-practicing Catholic.

=== Firearm at airport ===
In August 2014, Transportation Security Administration agents at the Orlando International Airport discovered a loaded .38 caliber revolver in Chitwood's carry-on bag. An Orlando Police officer escorted Chitwood and the firearm back to Chitwood's vehicle. Chitwood told The Daytona Beach News-Journal the incident was a mistake and that he was "embarrassed and stupid".

== See also ==
- Joe Arpaio
- Willis V. McCall
- Police brutality in the United States
