= Volusia Sheriff's Office =

Law enforcement agency for Volusia County, Florida

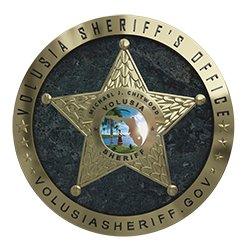
- Volusia Sheriff's Office badge

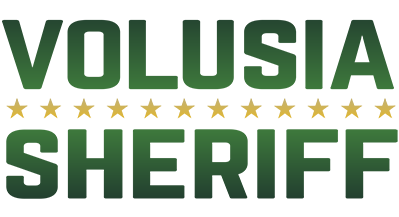
- Volusia Sheriff's Office logo
- Abbreviation: VSO
- Motto: Service–Honor–Integrity

Agency overview
- Formed: 1855; 171 years ago
- Employees: 860
- Annual budget: $1,300,000,000 (2024)

Jurisdictional structure
- Location of Volusia County with Florida
- Area: 1,432.44 square miles (3,710.0 km^{2})
- Population: 553,543
- Legal jurisdiction: Volusia County, Florida
- Governing body: County commission
- General nature: Local civilian police

Operational structure
- Headquarters: 123 W. Indiana Ave., DeLand, Florida, 32720
- Agency executives: Mike Chitwood (I), Sheriff; Brian Henderson, Chief Deputy
- Parent agency: Volusia County Council

Facilities
- District Offices: 5
- Jails: Volusia County Branch Jail

Website
- Official website

The Volusia Sheriff's Office (VSO) or Volusia County Sheriff's Office (VCSO) is the primary law enforcement agency of unincorporated Volusia County, the cities of Deltona, DeBary, and Oak Hill, as well as the town of Pierson. The VSO is headed by a sheriff, who serves a four-year term and is elected in a partisan election. The current sheriff is Michael J. Chitwood.

== Department structure ==
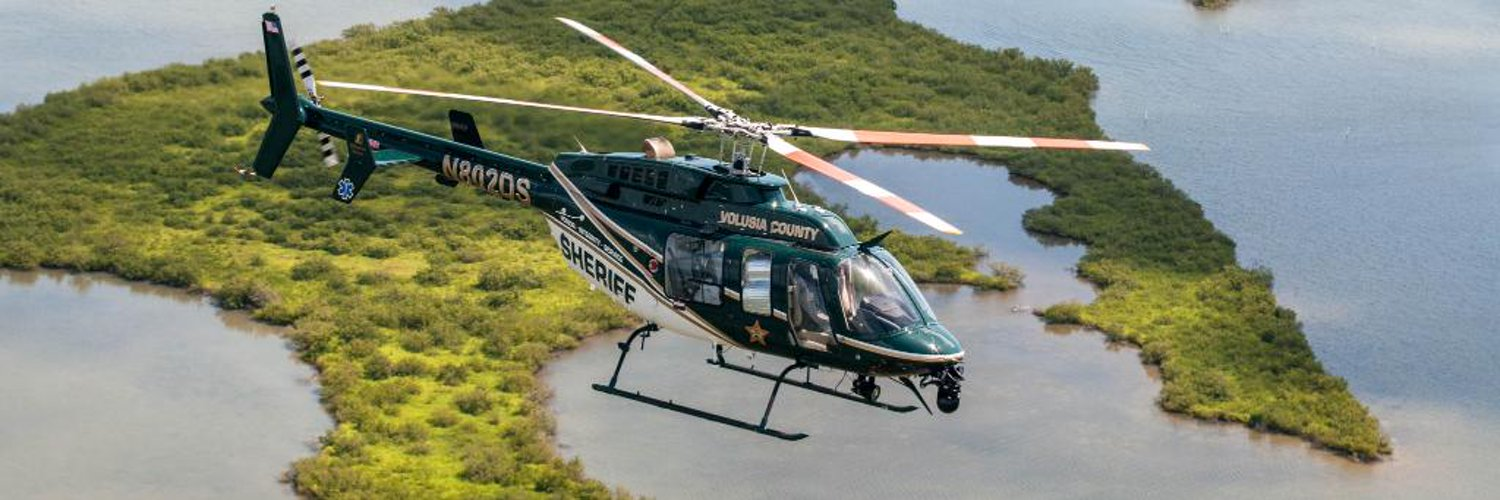
VSO helicopter

The Volusia Sheriff's Office is headed by a sheriff. Currently, the sheriff is Mike Chitwood who replaced former Sheriff Ben Johnson in 2017. Chitwood was previously Chief of Police of the Daytona Beach Police Department. The VSO has an annual budget of $1.3 billion, as of 2024.

=== Chief Deputy ===
The rank of chief deputy is the second-highest rank in the Office, reporting directly to the Sheriff. Each chief deputy serves as a member of the senior command staff and assists the sheriff in managing civilian and commissioned personnel.

=== District offices ===
The Volusia Sheriff's Office has five district offices and two substations across Volusia County.

- Daytona Beach
- DeBary
- Deltona
- DeLand
- Ormond Beach
- New Smyrna Beach

==== Substations ====
- Pierson
- Oak Hill

== Rank structure ==
Title	Insignia
Sheriff	
Chief Deputy	
Commander	
Colonel	
Major	
Captain	
Lieutenant	
Sergeant	
Deputy First Class	
Deputy	

== History ==
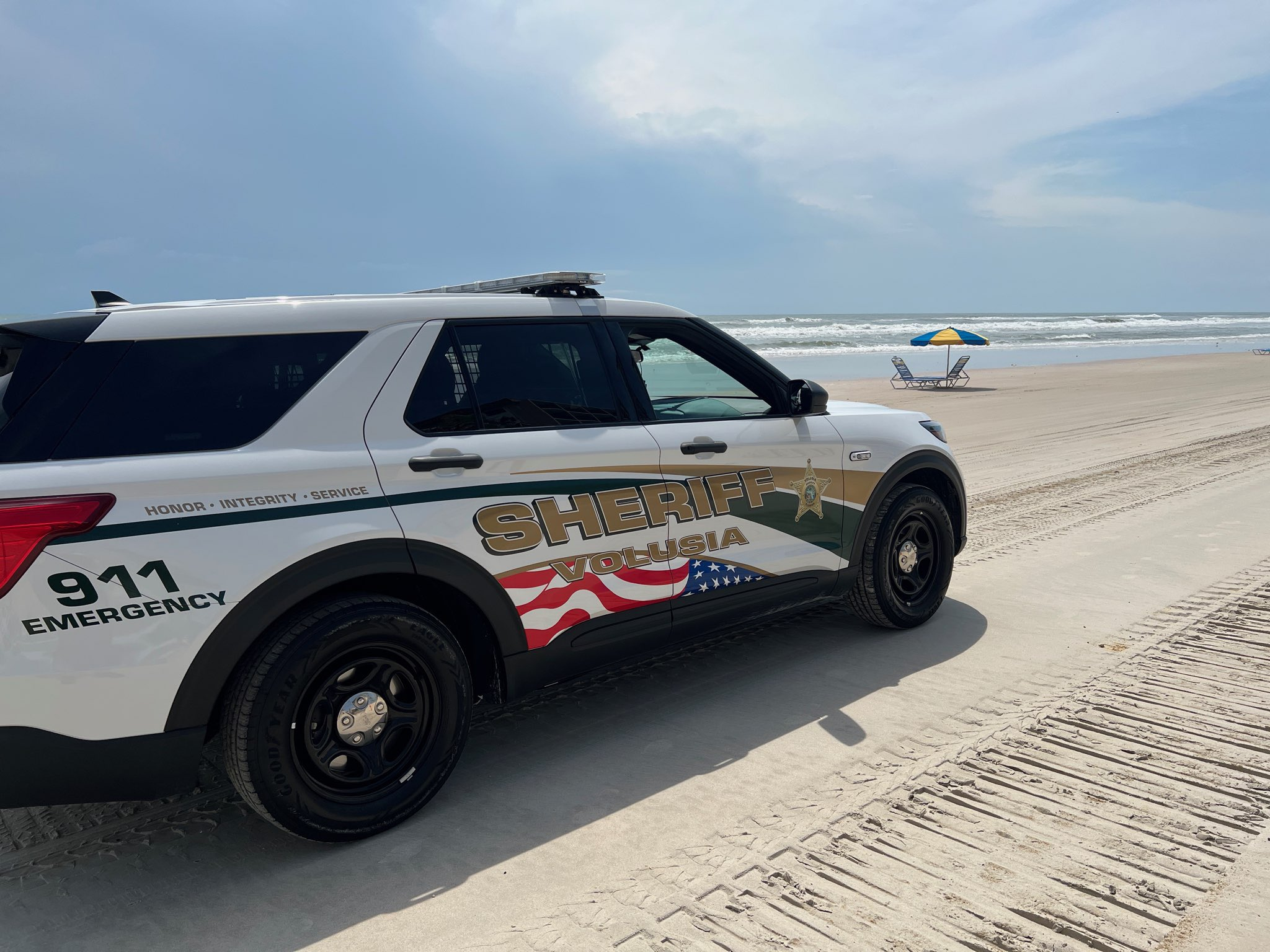
VSO patrol vehicle, New Smyrna Beach, Florida, 2023

Five deputies have been killed in the line of duty, including Sheriff Jefferson Davis Kurtz.

In 2017, the VSO began implementing reformist measures to reduce the size and scope of law enforcement in Volusia County. Classes on gender and racial bias in policing were implemented.

In 2020, the VSO implemented crisis intervention training for new officers in Volusia County with the goal of decreasing use-of-force and eliminating the "warrior mentality" in police operations; influenced by the Scottish police reform group Police Executive Research Forum (PERF). In the same period, the VSO equipped detectives and the SWAT team of Volusia County with body cameras and increased the use of SWAT.

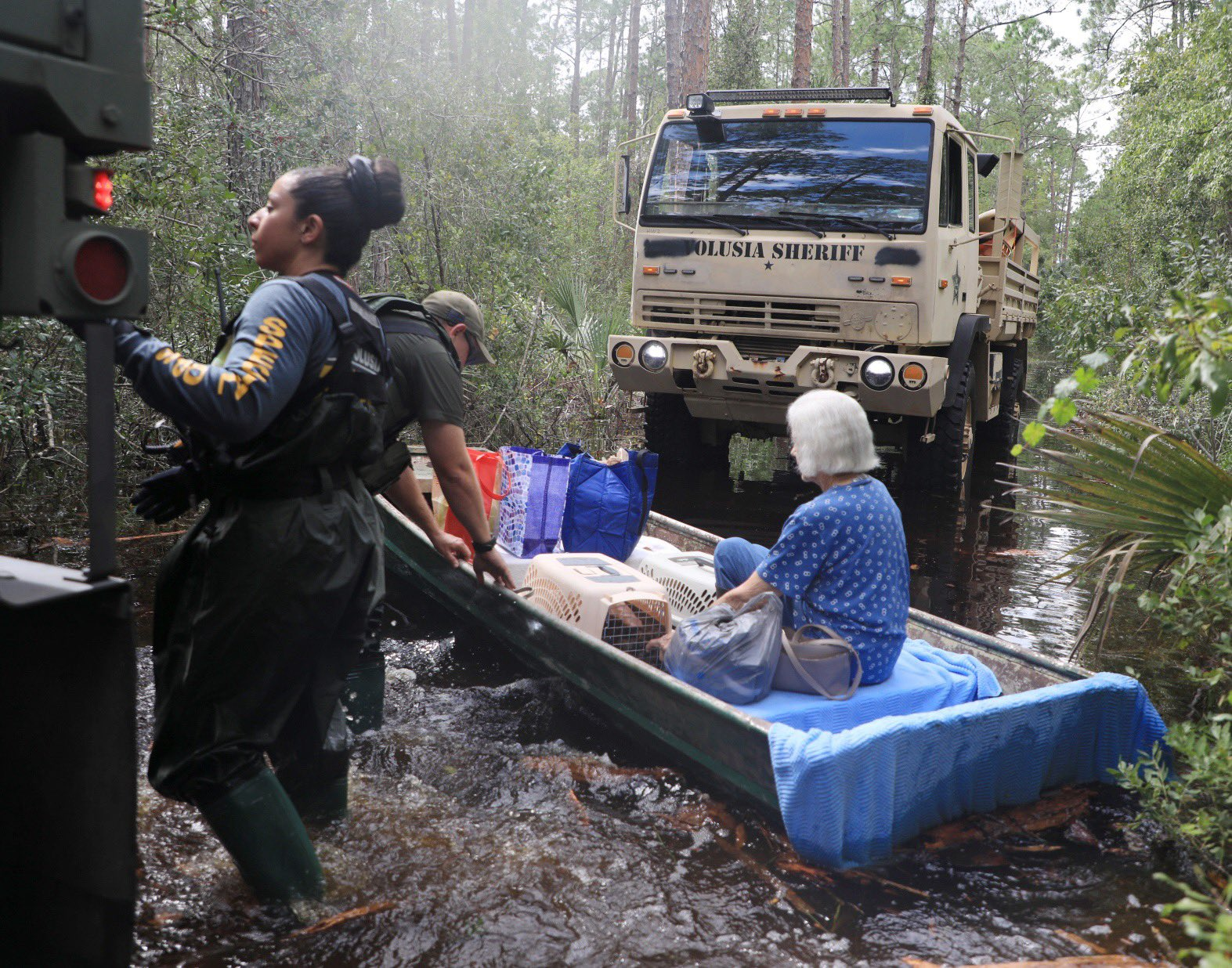
VSO deputies responding to Hurricane Milton, Samsula, FL

In 2024, Sheriff Chitwood received national attention for perp walking and posting mugshots of children who had been arrested. His actions were characterized by Kelly McBride of the Poynter Institute as "vindictive" and a "publicity stunt harmful to children".

=== List of sheriffs ===
Full list of sheriffs of Volusia County:

- Elijah Watson (1855–1856)
- Hezekiah E. Osteen (1856–1858)
- Thomas J. Brooke (1858–1859)
- A.J. Simmons (1859–1860)
- James C. Marsh (1860–1862)
- Cordin Barnes (1862–1863)
- Ora Carpenter (1863–1865)
- Rueben Marsh (1865–1868)
- Andrew H. Alexander (1868–1870)
- William F. Bucknor (1870–1874)
- Christopher C. Hart (1874–1875)
- Hezekiah E. Osteen (1875–1876)
- William A. Cone (1876–1885)
- Barton F. Brooks (1885–1886)
- Uriah M. Bennett (1886–1887)
- G. P. Healy (1887–1889)
- William K. Turner (1889)
- Henry Stevenson (1889–1891)
- Jefferson Davis Kurtz (1891–1895)
- John Frohock (1895)
- John R. Turner (1895–1908)
- E. L. Smith (1908–1916)
- Lee Morris (1916–1924)
- S. Edward Stone (1924–1953)
- James H. Tucker (1953–1956)
- Rodney B. Thursby (1956–1968)
- Edwin H. Duff II (1968–1989)
- Robert L. Vogel, Jr. (1989–2001)
- Ben F. Johnson (2001–2017)
- Mike Chitwood (2017–present)

== See also ==
- Mike Chitwood
- County sheriff (Florida)
- List of law enforcement agencies in Florida
- List of United States state and local law enforcement agencies
