= Roy Frank Roberts =

American politician

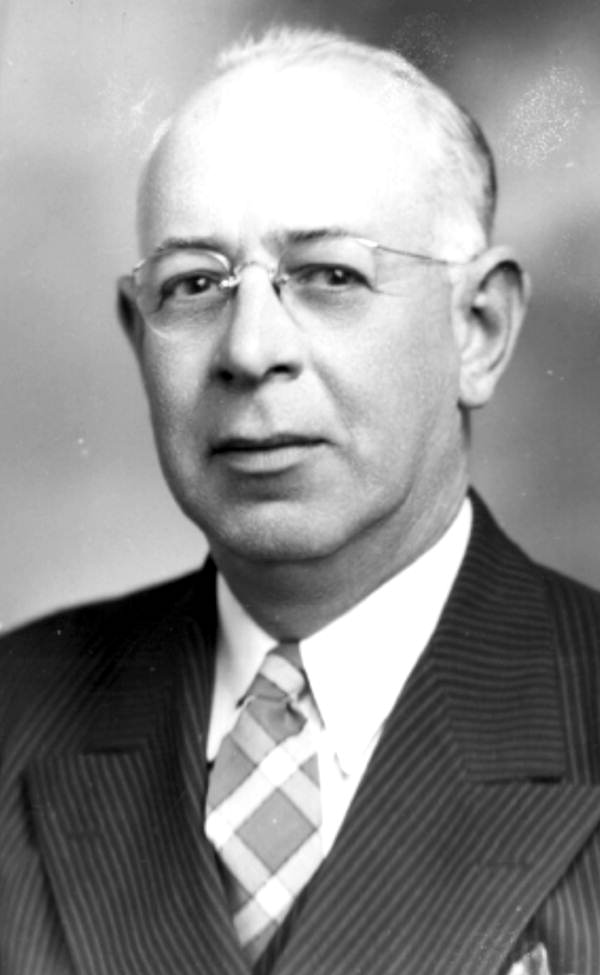
- Roberts in 1945

Member of the Florida House of Representatives from Brevard County
- In office 1945–1949

Personal details
- Born: September 9, 1891 Manton, Michigan, U.S.
- Died: January 11, 1959 (aged 67)
- Party: Democratic

Roy Frank Roberts (September 9, 1891 – January 11, 1959) was an American politician. He served as a Democratic member of the Florida House of Representatives.

== Early life ==
Roberts was born in Manton, Michigan. He was an automobile dealer and citrus grower.

== Political career ==
Roberts was sheriff of Brevard County, Florida for eight years. Roberts served in the Florida House of Representatives from 1945 to 1949. he was first elected to the house in 1944 unopposed and then sought re-election in 1946 again elected unopposed and sought re-election again in 1948. He was defeated by Hubert E. Griggs but was re-elected in August 1949 after Griggs resigned.

== Death ==
Roberts died January 11, 1959 at his home in Orsino, Florida aged 67 survived by his wife and son.
