= Columbia College (Virginia) =

Private college in Vienna, Virginia, US

Coordinates: 38.878°N 77.231°W

- Type: Private for-profit vocational college
- Established: 1999; 27 years ago
- President: Richard K. Kim
- Students: 239
- Location: Vienna, Virginia, United States
- Website: www.ccdc.edu

Columbia College is a private for-profit vocational college in Vienna, Virginia. It offers certificates and associate degrees.

== Accreditation and certification ==
Since 2007, Columbia College has been nationally accredited by The Council on Occupational Education (COE) It is certified to operate by the State Council of Higher Education of Virginia (SCHEV).
