= Theodore Hartridge Willard =

American politician

Theodore Hartridge Willard was a sheriff, mayor, state legislator, and merchant in Florida. He lived in High Springs, Florida. He served as a Captain with a volunteer company of Confederates in Florida during the American Civil War. He was involved in a contested election in 1881 for a Florida Senate seat. He prevailed and served in the Florida Senate representing Madison County, Florida.

He testified that "colored" women and daughters threatened to hurt their husbands and fathers if they did not vote for Republicans.

The Florida Archives have photos of him with an African American child he "raised". and an 1898 wedding photo with Roberta Brown in High Springs, Florida. The archives also include a photograph of his 3 year-old son Theodore Hartridge Willard Jr. dressed up for a Confederate soldier reunion event.
