= Scott Beigel =

American teacher and cross-country coach killed in the 2018 Parkland school shooting

- Born: October 22, 1982; Long Island City, Queens, New York, U.S.
- Died: February 14, 2018 (aged 35); Parkland, Florida, U.S.
- Education: University of Miami; Farmingdale State College; Touro College
- Occupations: Teacher, cross-country coach
- Known for: Saving students during the Stoneman Douglas High School shooting

Scott J. Beigel (October 22, 1982 – February 14, 2018) was an American geography teacher and cross-country coach at Marjory Stoneman Douglas High School in Parkland, Florida. He was killed while attempting to protect students during the Stoneman Douglas High School shooting on February 14, 2018.

Beigel was among the 17 people killed in the shooting. He was credited by surviving students and colleagues with helping students reach safety by unlocking the door to his classroom and allowing them to shelter inside before he was shot while attempting to secure the door.

== Early life and education ==
Beigel was born on October 22, 1982 in Long Island City, Queens, and grew up in Dix Hills, New York. He attended the University of Miami before completing his undergraduate education at Farmingdale State College, where he earned a degree in technology studies and subsequently obtained teaching certification. He later earned a master's degree in education from Touro College.

As a young adult, Beigel became involved with Camp Starlight, a summer camp in Pennsylvania. He had attended the camp as a child and later worked there as a counselor and division leader. He continued working at the camp for many years alongside his teaching career.

Before moving to Florida, Beigel also volunteered as a teacher in Cape Town, South Africa, where he worked with children at a township school.

== Teaching career ==
Beigel initially taught younger students in the Fort Lauderdale area before obtaining a secondary-school social sciences teaching credential. In 2017, he joined the faculty of Marjory Stoneman Douglas High School, where he taught geography and world history. He also became the school's boys' cross-country coach.

Students and colleagues described Beigel as approachable and supportive. His experience at Camp Starlight influenced his approach to working with young people, and former students and campers recalled his emphasis on encouraging children and helping them develop confidence.

== Stoneman Douglas High School shooting ==
On February 14, 2018, a former student, Nikolas Cruz, entered Marjory Stoneman Douglas High School and opened fire, killing 17 people and injuring 17 others.

During the shooting, students were attempting to find classrooms in which they could shelter. According to surviving student Kelsey Friend, Beigel unlocked the door to his classroom and allowed students to enter. He then attempted to close and secure the door after the students had entered. He was shot in the hallway outside the classroom and died at the scene.

The students who entered the classroom survived the shooting. Beigel's actions were subsequently widely described as heroic, with students and public officials recognizing that his actions helped protect students from the gunman.

== Legacy ==
Following his death, Beigel was remembered by former students, colleagues and members of the Camp Starlight community for his work with young people. A memorial fund was established in his name to help children from disadvantaged backgrounds attend summer camp.

In 2018, the street where Beigel grew up in Dix Hills, New York, was renamed Scott J. Beigel Way in his honor.

In 2019, the New York State Senate adopted a resolution honoring Beigel for his actions during the shooting and describing his actions as an example of bravery and dedication to students.

Beigel's actions have also been commemorated alongside those of fellow Marjory Stoneman Douglas High School staff members Aaron Feis and Chris Hixon, who were also killed while responding to the shooting.

== See also ==
- Stoneman Douglas High School shooting
- Aaron Feis
- Chris Hixon
