= Elizabeth Scherer =

American judge

Elizabeth Anne Scherer
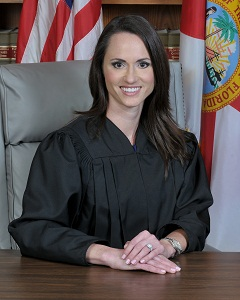
- Official portrait, 2013

Judge of the Seventeenth Judicial Circuit Court of Florida
- In office December 14, 2012 – June 30, 2023
- Appointed by: Rick Scott
- Preceded by: David Krathen

Personal details
- Born: June 4, 1976 (age 50)
- Spouse: Anthony Mercer (m. 2002; div. 2009)
- Education: Florida State University (B.A.), University of Miami School of Law (J.D.)

Elizabeth Anne Scherer (born June 4, 1976) is an American lawyer who served as a judge in the Seventeenth Judicial Circuit Court of Florida from 2012 until her resignation in 2023.

Scherer gained national attention in 2022 after being randomly assigned to preside over the trial of Nikolas Cruz, the perpetrator of the 2018 Parkland high School shooting in Parkland, Florida, the deadliest high school shooting in United States history. Her conduct during the trial was later found to be in violation of rules governing judicial conduct and biased towards the prosecution, resulting in a formal reprimand from the Florida Supreme Court.

== Life and career ==
Scherer graduated from Florida State University with a B.A. in English and received a J.D. from the University of Miami School of Law. She is the daughter of William R. Scherer, a private attorney who was part of the legal team representing George W. Bush during the 2000 United States presidential election recount in Florida. Before being appointed as a judge by Governor Rick Scott in 2012, Scherer worked as a prosecutor under state attorney Michael Satz, who would later lead prosecution in the Cruz trial.

=== Parkland shooter trial ===
Judge Scherer had been relatively unknown outside of Broward County until being assigned to preside over the high-profile case of the Parkland shooter, Nikolas Cruz. Her conduct in the case drew both praise and criticism. Scherer permitted the jury to conduct a walk-through of the school building while also limiting the amount of information public defenders were allowed to disclose to jurors regarding the failures of the federal government agencies in handling Cruz prior to the shooting. During the trial, Scherer reprimanded both the defense and prosecution teams for squabbling with each other, accusing them of turning the trial into a "playground" and disrespecting the court. Video footage of the trial was widely shared on social media.

Scherer refused to step down after the defense had argued that the judge was biased against their client and was prejudicing the jurors. Following the trial, the Florida Association of Criminal Defense Lawyers sent an official complaint to the Chief Judge of Broward County describing her attitude toward the defense as "hostile and demeaning treatment of defense counsel". Scherer, who was further criticized for sharing hugs with the prosecutors following the case, received support from the victims' families, who, in an open letter posted on Twitter said that the judge "conducted herself with patience, professionalism, restraint &, when it was all over, compassion".

On April 13, 2023, the Florida Supreme Court unanimously agreed to grant death row inmate Randy Tundidor's request to disqualify Scherer from his case because of her actions after Cruz's sentencing and during Tundidor's postconviction proceedings.

On May 10, 2023, Scherer announced that she will be resigning June 30, 2023.

On June 2, 2023, the Florida Judicial Qualifications Commission found that Scherer violated many rules governing judicial conduct during Cruz's trial. The Commission recommended a public reprimand for Scherer. The public reprimand was issued the next month.
