= Matt Deitsch =

American writer and political advisor (born 1997)

- Born: Matthew Bryan Deitsch; October 4, 1997 (age 29)
- Education: Marjory Stoneman Douglas High School; California State University, Northridge; Santa Monica College (AA); The New School (BA)
- Occupations: Writer; gun violence prevention advocate; political advisor; freelance photographer
- Years active: 2017–present
- Organization: Never Again MSD
- Movement: March For Our Lives
- Relatives: Ryan Deitsch (brother); Sam Deitsch (sister)
- Website: www.linkedin.com/in/mattdeitsch/

Matthew Bryan Deitsch (born October 4, 1997) is an American writer, gun violence prevention advocate and political advisor. Before entering politics, he worked in broadcast media and was a freelance photographer, film director and music producer. After the 2018 Stoneman Douglas High School shooting in which his siblings witnessed, Deitsch became chief strategist for the March For Our Lives protests and began advocating for gun violence prevention. He is the older brother of activist Ryan Deitsch.

== Early life and education ==
Matthew Bryan Deitsch was born on October 4, 1997, and grew up in Parkland, Florida. He is the older brother of activists Sam and Ryan Deitsch and is a practicing Jew. He attended Marjory Stoneman Douglas High School from 2012 until he graduated in 2016. During his high school career, Deitsch was into television production and filmmaking. After graduating from high school, he moved to the Los Angeles metropolitan area and attended Santa Monica College, graduating with honors in 2017 with an associate of arts degree. During his career at Santa Monica College, Deitsch entered his early political career and organized for environmental causes, including beach cleanup, with his biology class. In a podcast interview hosted by CommonAlly, Deitsch credited taking a black feminism class with helping him become more educated about current affairs and politics in turn helping him participate in community organizing. After attending community college, he transferred to California State University, Northridge. Deitsch dropped out of Cal State Northridge after the Stoneman Douglas High School shooting. He graduated from The New School in 2020 with a bachelor's degree.

== Broadcasting, film, photography and music career ==
According to his LinkedIn profile, Deitsch started his early career as a freelance music producer as early as 2011, producing instrumental music for R&B and hip-hop artists with Audacity. During his high school career, he worked in filmmaking and was an assistant director for a 2016 film titled B.F.F. produced by RinkyDink Productions in the West Palm Beach, Florida area. Deitsch also co-created promotional videos for the city government of Parkland, Florida, throughout high school and was an intern for television channel HBO in New York City after graduating. After moving to the Los Angeles metropolitan area to attend college, he became a photographer for VICE Media and was a brand ambassador for Toms Shoes.

== Gun violence prevention advocacy and politics ==
While visiting his family on a college break in Parkland, Deitsch's sister Sam Deitsch and brother Ryan were attending Marjory Stoneman Douglas High School, his alma mater; a freshman and senior, respectively. His siblings were at the school during the Stoneman Douglas High School shooting in 2018 while his brother filmed from inside the school. Deitsch was buying cake for his sister because it was her birthday that day when he received a call from his mother saying there was an incident at the school. After the shooting, Deitsch, along with his siblings, X Gonzalez and David Hogg, brainstormed to come with a grassroots platform which eventually became March For Our Lives and Never Again MSD, the former in which he became director of strategy and ran day-to-day operations with Jaclyn Corin.

Since then, Deitsch has dedicated his time to work on gun control advocacy in his own right and on behalf of Never Again MSD. In November 2018, he travelled to Cape Town, South Africa, to accept the International Children's Peace Prize on behalf of March For Our Lives, along with his brother, Gonzalez, Hogg and Corin. He appeared on Good Morning America and The Daily Show with Trevor Noah to talk about gun violence and also co-authored a book with March For Our Lives titled Glimmer of Hope: How Tragedy Sparked a Movement in October 2018. Deitsch appeared in the 2020 documentary film Parkland Rising about the shooting and subsequent student activism.

In 2020, Deitsch joined Bernie Sanders's campaign for president of the United States as a gun violence prevention advisor and helped develop a gun violence prevention platform for the campaign. In an announcement, he commented: "America's gun violence epidemic is a public health crisis that requires dedicated organizing. The Military Industrial Complex has tainted our health across America and abroad, I am proud of Senator Sanders' growth and commitment to ending gun violence, and we won't win this fight for all of our safety unless we organize at a historic level. And that's what we are setting out to do with this effort."

== Bibliography ==
- with March For Our Lives (2018). Glimmer of Hope: How Tragedy Sparked a Movement. Penguin Young Readers Group. ISBN 9781984836403.

== Filmography ==
Year	Title	Role	Ref
2016	B.F.F.	Assistant director	
2018	Hinge	Production assistant	
2018	Fahrenheit 11/9	Self; editing consultant	
2018	The Daily Show with Trevor Noah	Self; guest appearance with X González	
2018	Good Morning America	Self; guest appearance with X González and Delaney Tarr	
2020	Parkland Rising	Self	
