= Aaron Feis =

American football coach and victim of Parkland school shooting

- Born: May 17, 1980
- Died: February 14, 2018 (aged 37); Parkland, Florida, U.S.
- Education: Marjory Stoneman Douglas High School
- Spouse: Melissa Feis
- Children: 1
- Relatives: Johanna Feis, Ray Feis, Michael Connell Jr.
- Awards: Best Coach/Manager ESPY Award

Aaron Louis Feis (May 17, 1980 – February 14, 2018) was an American high school coach and security guard at Marjory Stoneman Douglas High School. He was a victim of the Parkland high school shooting on February 14, 2018.

During the shooting, Feis ran into the school confronting the shooter. He was shot in an attempt to shield a group of students and died from his wounds. In the aftermath of the shooting, Feis was universally praised for the selflessness of his actions during the shooting. He posthumously received the Best Coach/Manager ESPY Award on July 18, 2018.

== Early and personal life ==
Aaron Louis Feis grew up in West Islip, New York. His family moved to Florida where he graduated from Marjory Stoneman Douglas High School in 1999. He was married to Melisa Feis, with whom he had a daughter. Those close to Feis described him as strongly devoted to his family.

== Marjory Stoneman Douglas High School ==
=== Tenure ===
In 2002, three years after graduating, Feis returned to MSDHS, serving as an assistant football coach as well as a school monitor.

==== 2018 shooting ====
On February 14, 2018, at approximately 2:21 P.M. EST, former student Nikolas Cruz opened fire in Marjory Stoneman Douglas High School. According to several eye witnesses and the sheriff's department, Feis quickly ran to the scene and attempted to protect students from gunfire. According to several sources, Feis died in the protection of two students from gunfire. By the end of the shooting, Cruz had killed 17 staff and students.

==== Reactions to Feis' death ====
After Feis' death was announced, many people came to express their sadness and memories of Feis as a positive influence on their lives. According to ESPN, none of those interviewed expressed surprise that Feis was willing to sacrifice his life in order to protect students. Dennis Lehtio, a spokesman for the school's football program, stated "[Feis] died the same way he lived – he put himself second."

Others remember Feis as a caring member of staff who students cited as a "big ol' teddy bear".

== Legacy ==
In 2019, the Miami Dolphins posthumously selected Feis as the George F. Smith Coach of the Year.

In 2025, in recognition of the actions of Feis as well as fellow teachers Scott Beigel and Chris Hixon, the Orange Bowl announced the Beigel-Feis-Hixon Valor Award, a US$10,000 scholarship given to an athlete who had "Identifiable actions, which clearly demonstrate extraordinary courage or commitment and how he/she has overcome obstacles."
