= Ryan Deitsch =

American activist against gun violence

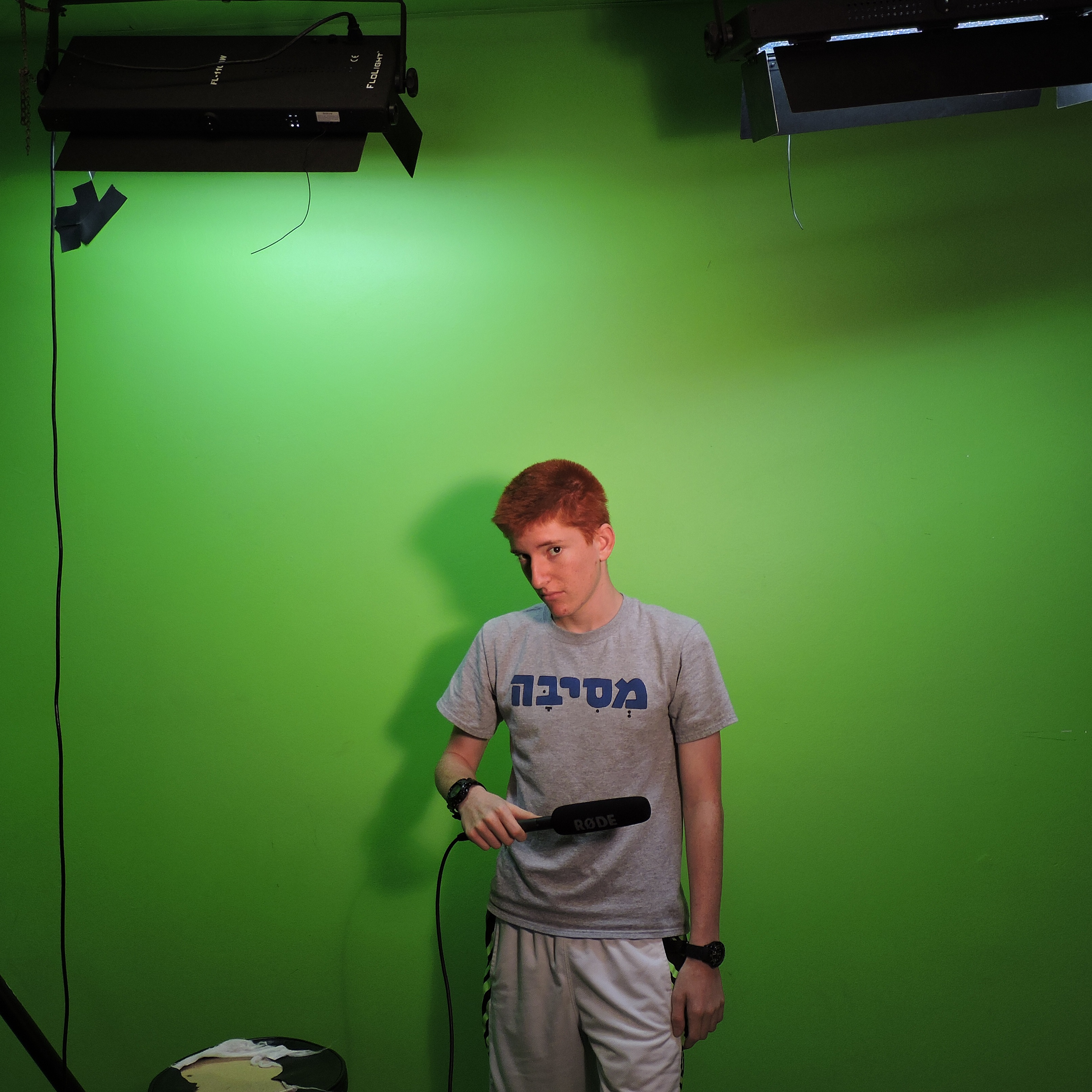
- Born: November 30, 1999 (age 26)
- Education: Stoneman Douglas High School (graduated 2018); American University
- Organization: Never Again MSD (founding member)
- Relatives: Matt Deitsch (brother); Sam Deitsch (sister)

Ryan Deitsch (born November 30, 1999) is an American student activist against gun violence, and a survivor of the Parkland massacre. He is a founding member of the Never Again MSD movement.

== Early life and education ==
Ryan Deitsch was born on November 30, 1999, into a Jewish family. He is the younger brother of filmmaker Matt Deitsch. He started attending Marjory Stoneman Douglas High School in 2014 and graduated in 2018. After taking a gap year to conduct gun violence prevention activism, he began attending American University in Washington, D.C. Deitsch majored in International Service focusing on U.S. Foreign Policy Toward Latin America and human rights; he graduated December 2022.

== Stoneman Douglas High School shooting ==
Deitsch filmed the active Stoneman Douglas High School massacre from inside the school, which occurred on his senior year there, and was saved as he hid with other students in a closet during the event. Deitsch has criticized the media for sensationalizing shooters, and has encouraged supporters to be a part of protests and marches. On February 21, 2018, he was a part of a CNN town hall with lawmakers, asking senator Marco Rubio the question, "Why do we have to march ... to save innocent lives?" Deitsch was featured in a Harvard Political Review interview, along with Cameron Kasky, and David Hogg.
