= Florida Man =

Internet meme

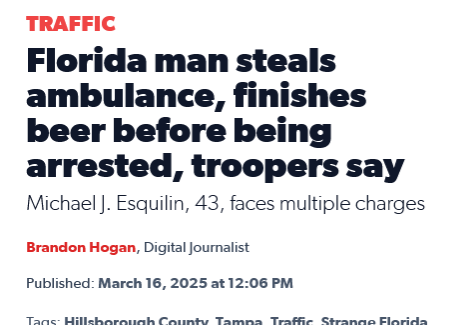
A 2025 headline about a Florida man

Florida Man is an Internet meme first popularized in 2013, referring to an alleged prevalence of people performing irrational, ridiculous, and maniacal actions in the U.S. state of Florida. Internet users typically submit links to news stories and articles about unusual or strange crimes, actions and other events occurring in Florida, with stories' headlines often beginning with "Florida Man ..." followed by the main event of the story. Because of the way news headlines are typically written, they can be creatively interpreted as implying that the subjects of the articles are all a single individual known as "Florida Man".

The Miami New Times claimed that freedom of information laws in Florida make it easier for journalists to acquire information about arrests from the police than in other states and that this is responsible for a large number of news articles. A CNN article on the meme also suggested that the breadth of reports of bizarre activities is due to a confluence of factors, including public records laws giving journalists fast and easy access to police reports, the relatively high population of the state, its highly variable weather, and gaps in mental health funding.

== Origin ==
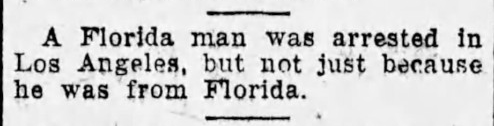
Florida man derided on August 9, 1925

The meme originated in February 2013 with the now abandoned Twitter account @_FloridaMan, which quoted notably strange or bizarre news headlines containing the words "Florida man", such as "Florida man run over by van after dog pushes accelerator" or "Police arrest Florida man for drunken joy ride on motorized scooter at Walmart". The account referred to "Florida Man" as the "World's Worst Superhero".

In an interview with WUSF, author Craig Pittman attributed the origin of the Florida Man stereotype to the writings of a man named Frederic Remington, predating the Internet. Upon visiting the state in 1995, Pittman states that Remington "wrote about encountering low-browed cow folk who would kill each other over cattle that he said weren't even fit for a pointer dog to mess on, which sort of started the stereotype rolling." In the same interview, Pittman theorizes that the recount in Florida during the 2000 election brought increased attention to the state that aided the rise of the meme.

== Spread ==
=== 2010s ===
Before the creation of the meme, the state of Florida had already garnered a colorful reputation on the Internet, with the social aggregation site Fark hosting a "Florida" content tag in the years before the Twitter account @_FloridaMan appeared. Also before the meme's creation, the novels of author Tim Dorsey were notable for their frequent depictions of outlandish and violent criminal activity in Florida. Florida-native and author Carl Hiaasen’s novels also have a reputation for their depictions of eccentric Florida residents and their activities. After the creation of the account in January 2013, and its ensuing popularization on social media sites such as Reddit and Tumblr, initially through the subreddit "r/FloridaMan" and the Tumblr blog "StuckInABucket", the meme was featured in numerous news articles and stories throughout February 2013.

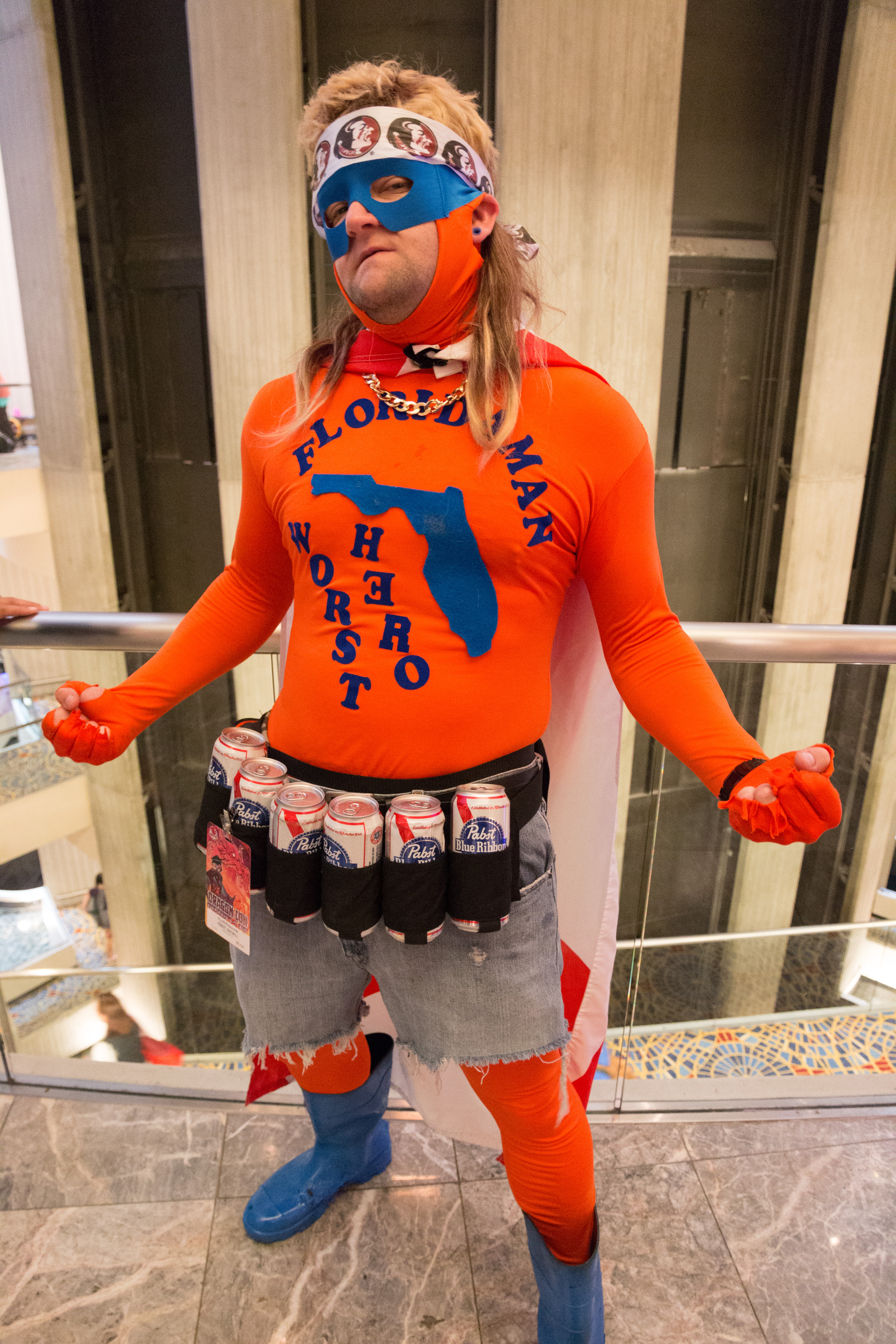
A person dressed as "Florida Man" at Dragon Con 2015

Filmmaker Sean Dunne released the documentary "Florida Man" in 2015, containing interviews with Floridians discussing aspects of their views and personal lives. Florida Man was also referred to in the opening episode of Season 2 of the FX show Atlanta as a sinister entity, referred to by Darius as an "alt-right Johnny Appleseed" who commits a variety of strange crimes in Florida as part of a plot to prevent Black people from voting, portrayed by Kevin Waterman. The Florida man meme inspired the creation of a poetry book by Floridian Tyler Gillespie, published in 2018. The book attempts to counteract negative stereotypes about the state by highlighting other aspects of Florida's culture and history. On November 1, 2018, Desi Lydic of The Daily Show filed a report comedically investigating the phenomenon of "Florida Man".

In 2018, IO Interactive released the stealth action video game Hitman 2. In the game's second level, set in Miami, Florida, the players can disguise themselves as "Florida Man", an owner of a local food stand. The player can use this disguise to poison and eliminate their target. The character of Florida Man also makes an appearance in a level set in Berlin, Germany in Hitman 3, where the player can again take his disguise.

Becoming popular in 2019 and periodically resurfacing on social media sites like Reddit is a variation of the meme, dubbed the "Florida Man Birthday Challenge", in which people search the date of their birthday followed by "Florida Man" on a search engine with the goal to find bizarre news reports involving a "Florida Man" on that date. The maintainer of the Twitter account @_FloridaMan stated in 2019 that he had "retired" from creating tweets at that account. A play titled Florida Man by Michael Presley Bobbitt premiered July 31, 2019, at New York's Theatre Row Studios.

On October 31, 2019, Donald Trump, then president of the United States, changed his legal residence from New York City to Palm Beach, Florida, the location of the Mar-a-Lago resort he owns and frequently visits. Sources joked about Trump becoming "Florida Man", including The Daily Show, which released an extension for Google Chrome and Firefox that changed all instances of Trump's name to "Florida Man". On October 24, 2020, during his rally for presidential candidate Joe Biden in Florida, former President Barack Obama mocked Trump, saying, "'Florida Man' wouldn't even do this stuff", referring to Trump's handling of the COVID-19 pandemic and his handling of domestic and foreign affairs.

=== 2020s ===
American rock band Blue Öyster Cult referred to the phenomenon in the song "Florida Man" on their 2020 album The Symbol Remains. Republican U.S. Representative from Florida Matt Gaetz has embraced the moniker "Florida Man" for himself, including in his Twitter bio, and with his "Florida Man Freedom Tour" in 2021. On November 16, 2022, the New York Post reported Trump's 2024 presidential campaign announcement on the front page as "Florida Man Makes Announcement", proceeding to mock the former president on page 26 referring to Mar-a-Lago as containing his "classified-documents library".

In March 2023, Netflix announced a streaming television limited series titled Florida Man from showrunner and Florida native Donald Todd, starring Edgar Ramírez as a disgraced ex-policeman who is forced to return to his native Florida in search of a mobster's missing girlfriend. An unfriendly profile of Republican Florida governor Ron DeSantis published on the website of the left-wing U.S. political magazine Current Affairs on May 26, 2023, is entitled "Florida Man". A Florida Man Games event took place in 2024 in St. Augustine, Florida.

Episode 4 of the second season of Peacock series Poker Face takes place in Florida, with numerous references to Florida stereotypes popularized by the Florida Man meme. Character Chief Hal (played by John Sayles) also directly references the meme, referring to another character as the "opposite of Florida Man memes". ABC television series RJ Decker features a bar called FM Station, where "FM" stands for "Florida Man". The bar is decorated with articles showcasing the exploits of "Florida Men", and any patron who can prove they are the Florida Man featured in an article earns a free drink. The first trailer for the 2026 video game Grand Theft Auto VI, set in the fictional state of Leonida, showed several references to a "Leonida Man", parodying both Florida and Florida Man respectively.

== Reception ==
The meme has widely been seen as a confirmation of the association between the state of Florida and bizarre or humorous activity, and has been compared to the Darwin Awards. The meme was criticized by Columbia Journalism Review, which called it "one of journalism's darkest and most lucrative cottage industries", where "stories tend to stand as exemplars of the mythical hyper-weirdness of the Sunshine State, but more often simply document the travails of the drug-addicted, mentally ill, and homeless."

== See also ==
- It's Florida, Man – HBO anthology series
- List of Internet phenomena
- Ohio (meme)
- Skweezy Jibbs – comedy character described by creator Tim Savage as a variation on the stereotype
