= Sam Deitsch =

American gun control advocate (born 2003)

- Born: Samantha Deitsch; February 14, 2003 (age 23)
- Education: Marjory Stoneman Douglas High School
- Occupation: High school student
- Years active: 2018–present
- Organization: Never Again MSD
- Known for: Gun control advocacy
- Relatives: Matt Deitsch (brother); Ryan Deitsch (brother)

Samantha Deitsch (born February 14, 2003) is an American author and gun control activist who survived the Stoneman Douglas High School shooting in 2018.

== Early life ==
Samantha Deitsch was born on February 14, 2003. She started attending Marjory Stoneman Douglas High School in 2017. Deitsch was a freshman at Marjory Stoneman Douglas High School when the mass shooting occurred in 2018. She was friends with one of the victims, Jaime Guttenberg. She is the younger sister of film director Matt Deitsch and activist Ryan Deitsch.

== Gun control advocacy ==
After the Stoneman Douglas High School shooting, Deitsch and her older brothers started to embark on gun control advocacy with March For Our Lives. She co-founded the organization and helped contribute to Glimmer of Hope, a book about the activism after the shooting. Prior to her gun control advocacy, Deitsch described herself as not politically active.

== Political views ==
In 2019, Broward County, Florida, adopted a Text-to-9-1-1 system and Deitsch expressed her support for the new system: "Being able to text 911 is a necessary addition to pre-existing public safety resources".

== Bibliography ==
- with March For Our Lives (2018). Glimmer of Hope: How Tragedy Sparked a Movement. Penguin Young Readers Group. ISBN 9781984836403.
