= Florida Man Games =

Annual multi-sport event in St Augustine, Florida

- Frequency: Annually
- Location: Rotation of Venues in Florida
- Inaugurated: 2024
- Founder: Pete Melfi
- Website: thefloridamangames.com

The Florida Man Games is an athletic event which parodies the "Florida Man" internet phenomenon.

== Origin ==
The event is organized by Pete Melfi, who runs the local media outlet The 904 Now. Melfi had already organized a half-kilometer beer run in 2023. He has stated that he came up with the various events in the Games by "reverse-engineer[ing] years of 'Florida man' headlines." He has also said that he was told to tone down some parts of the Florida Man idea in order to receive a permit for the event, stating that "the city frowned on it when I asked for drugs and nudity."

== Versions of the games ==
=== 2024 games ===
The inaugural 2024 Florida Man Games were first announced in October 2023, touted as "the most insane athletic showdown on Earth" by organizers. Two former stars of American Gladiators, Dan "Nitro" Clark and Lori "Ice" Fetrick, agreed to serve as referees, and organizers stated that athleticism was not required for competitors to enter. Ripley's Believe It or Not! were initially billed to be sponsoring the games.

The event took place on Saturday, February 24 at Francis Field in downtown St. Augustine, Florida, with spectators paying $45 or $55 per ticket. It was sponsored by Florida apparel company FloGrown, as well as a car dealership and a gym. It benefitted the Jimmy Jam Community Outreach nonprofit.

Competitors formed sixteen teams in which they would compete, each making up exaggerated personas to gain supporters. Team names included the Red Eyed Gator Huggers, the Cooter Commandos, and Hanky Spanky. In the run-up to the event, teams posted on Facebook, including one team chugging Pabst Blue Ribbon beer and jogging in jean shorts and mirrored sunglasses. The games were introduced with "The Star-Spangled Banner" played on an electric guitar. Team Hanky Spanky received the championship belt for the 2024 Games, as well as $5,000.

=== Events ===
- Beer Belly Florida Sumo – sumo wrestling while holding pitchers of beer.
- A Catalytic Converter, Two Bikes and a Handful of Copper Pipes: Race Against Time – a three-part theft relay in which competitors each weaved a bicycle through cones while holding a catalytic converter, then picked a padlock on another bicycle to get both back through the course, followed by the theft of a batch of copper piping which they were required to get across the finish line in a trailer.
- Category 5 Cash Grab – competitors had 60 seconds to grab dollar bills while standing in wind machines.
- Chicken Shit Bingo – an audience crossed off bingo numbers corresponding to the numbers on a large bingo card which were defecated on by a rooster and four hens inside a cage.
- Eat the Butt – a pork-eating contest.
- Evading Arrest Obstacle Course – competitors each escaped from handcuffs inside a police car, jumped fences, threw an inflatable alligator through a window, tipped over three wooden cows and rescued a plastic iguana from a pool of mud, all while being chased by real uniformed deputies from St. Johns County Sheriff's Office.
- Florida Ma'am Pinup – the only women's event at the Games, in which women competed as pinup girls.
- Mullet Competition.
- Weaponised Pool Noodle Mud Duel – competitors fought with weapons made from pool noodles and duct tape in an inflatable pool of muddy water.

=== 2025 games ===
Organizers accepted video applications for the 2025 Florida Man Games until September 2024. A "scouting combine" was to be held on 17 November 2024, hosted by wrestler Sam Shaw at Hatchet Pro Wrestling.

The Games were held on March 1, 2025 at the larger St. Johns County Fairgrounds in Elkton to accommodate more space, a covered arena, and a dedicated "RV tailgating area". The games were hosted by Florida comedians Josh Wicks Robinson and Kevin Flynn. Many of the events were retained with the addition of lawnmower racing, alligator shows, "Human Beer Pong", a "Hellzapoppin Freak Show", "Florida Woman Bonus Challenge", "Hurricane Party Prep - Grocery Aisle Brawl", and "Midget Wrestling Warriors", alongside professional wrestling matches. Additionally, each team was newly required to have a woman, and there is also an all-women's team, the Ball Busters.

== Reception ==
Jeremy Clarkson compared the games to British game show It's a Knockout., humorously proposing the Henley Man Games, Ascot Man Games, and Cheltenham Man Games Gold Cup.
