= Ohio (meme) =

Internet meme and slang word

Ohio, also referred to as Only in Ohio or Ohio vs. the World (or "Ohio Against the World"), is an Internet slang term and meme first popularized in 2016. The term refers to surreal and random phenomena that supposedly occur in the U.S. state of Ohio. The term is one of many slang words associated with Generation Z and Generation Alpha. It has also entered brainrot lexicon.

== History ==
In 2016, a Tumblr user posted a picture of a Chicago Transit Authority bus stop with an announcement reading "Ohio will be eliminated." The message was intended to inform riders about a bus stop removal at the intersection of Ohio Street and Michigan Avenue; however, the photo became viral over the message being misconstrued to refer to violent destruction of the state instead of the removal of the street's bus stop. In the years after the photo was published, absurdist memes related to Ohio were published on social media.

Starting in 2022, videos that attribute Ohio with bizarre and sometimes disturbing situations ("Only in Ohio" videos) became viral. They were often coupled with a song, "Swag Like Ohio" by Lil B. The term Ohio was later coupled with newly popular Internet slang terms like "sigma", "rizz" and "skibidi". The term could be used as a random interjection as-well, and was memed in other contexts such as the Japanese word for good morning.

In 2022, music artist CG5 released a single titled "Only in Ohio", a nerdcore hip-hop song about the meme. Despite his discography of songs about memes, this song in specific received a majority of negative responses from people, claiming the song "killed" the meme.

== See also ==
- Florida Man
- List of Internet phenomena
