= George Poveromo =

George Poveromo is an angling authority, National Seminar host, television host, and Editor-At-Large for Salt Water Sportsman.

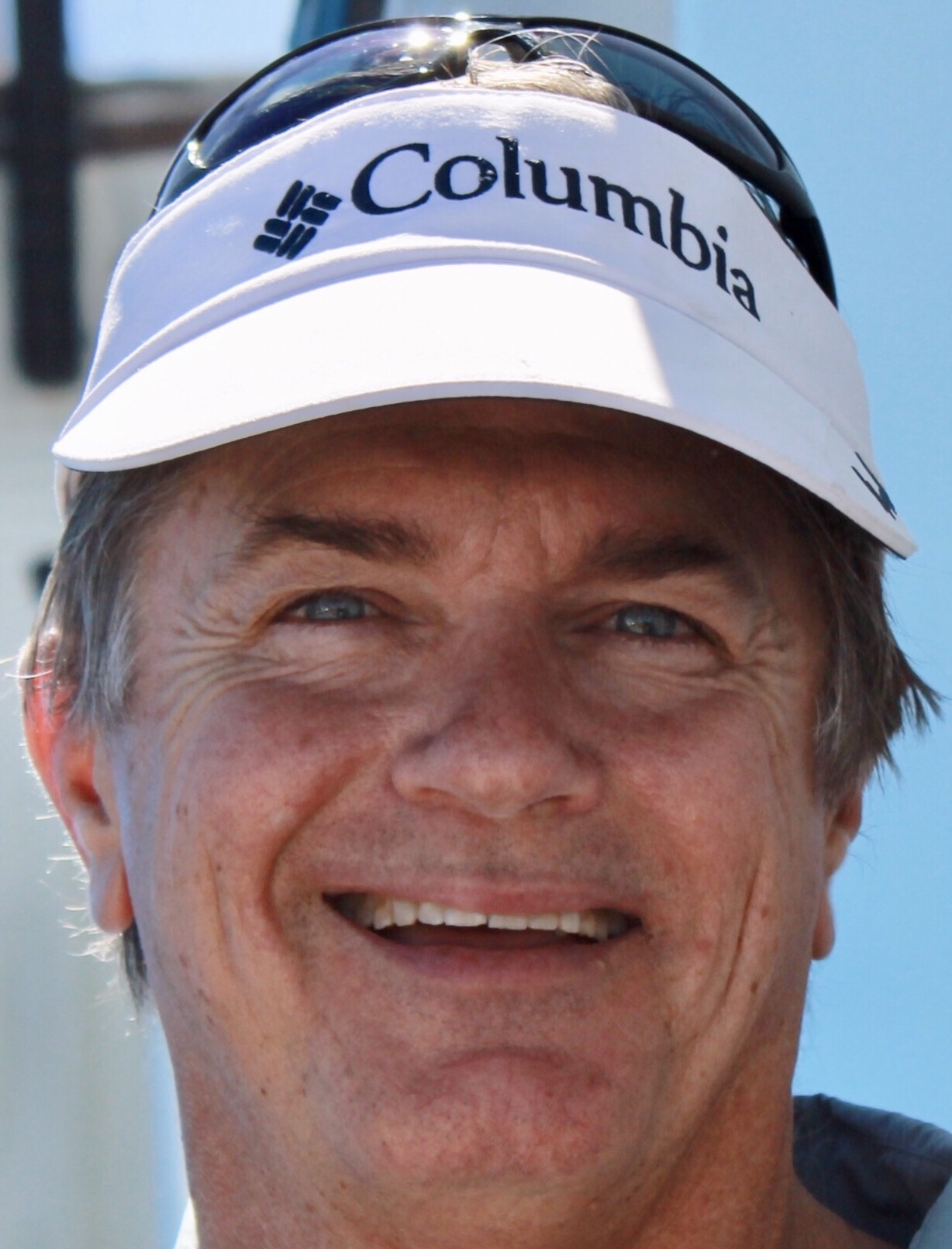
George Poveromo, American Angler

Poveromo, a native of South Florida in the United States, has fished most of the U.S. coast as well as many countries. He demonstrates his expertise through his column "Tactics and Tackle" in Salt Water Sportsman. Poveromo is a member of the Outdoor Writers Association of America, Southeast Outdoor Press Association, and Boating Writers International. He is an advocate of catch and release fishing, and is a member of the Coastal Conservation Association. He also serves as the offshore spokesperson for the Florida Coastal Conservation Association.

Poveromo is Editor-At-Large for Salt Water Sportsman magazine, the oldest and most widely distributed sport fishing magazine in the United States. Salt Water Sportsman has a paid monthly circulation of over 150,000 readers. Poveromo has been part of the Salt Water staff since 1983.

In addition to Salt Water Sportsman, George has been the host of their National Seminar Series for all forty years of the tour. The National Seminar Series, which has eight nationwide stops per year, instructs people on how to catch popular coastal and offshore game fish. The Salt Water Sportsman National Seminar Series is the largest and most successful fishing seminar in the nation.

Most popularly noted would be George's television program, George Poveromo's World of Saltwater Fishing, which runs on the Discovery Channel and ESPN2. The show has been airing going on 27-years. It aired originally on ESPN2 for 10 seasons and was then picked up by the NBC Sports Network, formerly Versus when ESPN canceled its coverage of fishing. It was then picked up by the Discovery Channel after airing for nine years on NBC Sports. The show is also now available to stream online via YouTube. Each week, Poveromo presents a cool and informative fishing episode from a U.S. coastal or Bahamas fishing destination.

Poveromo owns a Mako 334 Sportfish Edition named the MARC VI. The vessel is powered by triple 400hp Mercury Verado outboards and equipped with SIMRAD fish-finding electronics. Poveromo has long been a proponent of Mako boats.

Half of the year when George isn't filming or his show is not on TV, he does seminars in different states.

Poveromo is a graduate of the University of Miami and lives in Parkland, Florida, with his wife, Edie. He has two daughters, Lindsay and Megan; the latter was featured in several episodes of George's television shows.
