= Best Coach/Manager ESPY Award =

Annual athletic award

The Best Coach/Manager Award has been presented annually since 1993 to the head coach or manager of a team contesting play in a professional North American or collegiate sports league adjudged to be the best in a given calendar year.

Between 1993 and 2004, the award voting panel comprised variously fans; sportswriters and broadcasters, sports executives, and retired sportspersons, termed collectively experts; and ESPN personalities, but balloting thereafter has been exclusively by fans over the Internet from amongst choices selected by the ESPN Select Nominating Committee. Through the 2001 iteration of the ESPY Awards, ceremonies were conducted in February of each year to honor achievements over the previous calendar year; awards presented thereafter are conferred in July and reflect performance from the June previous. The award wasn't awarded in 2020 due to the COVID-19 pandemic.

== List of winners ==
Year	Coach	Team	League or Competition	Sport
1994	Jimmy Johnson	Dallas Cowboys	National Football League	American football
1995	George Seifert	San Francisco 49ers	National Football League	American football
1996	Gary Barnett	Northwestern Wildcats football	NCAA Division I-A	American football
1997	Joe Torre	New York Yankees	Major League Baseball	Baseball
1998	Jim Leyland	Florida Marlins	Major League Baseball	Baseball
1999	Joe Torre (2)	New York Yankees	Major League Baseball	Baseball
2000	Joe Torre (3)	New York Yankees	Major League Baseball	Baseball
2001	Joe Torre (4)	New York Yankees	Major League Baseball	Baseball
2002	Phil Jackson	Los Angeles Lakers	National Basketball Association	Basketball
2003	Jon Gruden	Tampa Bay Buccaneers	National Football League	American football
2004	Larry Brown	Detroit Pistons	National Basketball Association	Basketball
2005	Bill Belichick	New England Patriots	National Football League	American football
2006	Bill Cowher	Pittsburgh Steelers	National Football League	American football
2007	Tony Dungy	Indianapolis Colts	National Football League	American football
2008	Pat Summitt	Tennessee Lady Vols basketball	NCAA Division I	Basketball
2009	Phil Jackson (2)	Los Angeles Lakers	National Basketball Association	Basketball
2010	Phil Jackson (3)	Los Angeles Lakers	National Basketball Association	Basketball
2011	Rick Carlisle	Dallas Mavericks	National Basketball Association	Basketball
2012	Tom Coughlin	New York Giants	National Football League	American football
2013	Rick Pitino	Louisville Cardinals men's basketball	NCAA Division I	Basketball
2014	Gregg Popovich	San Antonio Spurs	National Basketball Association	Basketball
2015	Steve Kerr	Golden State Warriors	National Basketball Association	Basketball
2016	Tyronn Lue	Cleveland Cavaliers	National Basketball Association	Basketball
2017	Bob Hurley	St. Anthony High School	High school basketball	Basketball
2018	Aaron Feis, Scott Beigel, Chris Hixon	Marjory Stoneman Douglas High School	High school	Various
2019	Jim Calhoun	Saint Joseph	NCAA Division III	Basketball
2020	Not awarded due to the COVID-19 pandemic			
2021	Tara VanDerveer	Stanford	NCAA Division I	Basketball

== See also ==
- Jack Adams Award
- MLS Coach of the Year Award
- Major League Baseball Manager of the Year Award, The Sporting News Manager of the Year Award
- National Basketball Association Coach of the Year Award
- National Football League Coach of the Year Award
- Clair Bee Coach of the Year Award, Henry Iba Award, Naismith College Coach of the Year Award (collegiate basketball)
- Paul "Bear" Bryant Award, Walter Camp Coach of the Year Award, Bobby Dodd Coach of the Year Award (collegiate football)
