= Michael Satz =

American attorney and politician

Michael J Satz is an American attorney and politician who served as State Attorney for Florida's 17th judicial in Broward County, Florida from 1976 to 2021.

== Early life and education ==
Satz was born in Philadelphia. He graduated from Temple University and the University of Miami School of Law.

== Career ==
In 2018, Satz was the lead prosecutor for the trial of the gunman in the Stoneman Douglas High School shooting.

== Awards and recognitions ==
Satz instituted a Victim Advocate Unit to provide counseling and assistance to victims for which he received the 2004 President's Award by the Broward Victim's Rights Coalition.

In 2015, Satz received Lifetime Achievement Awards from both the B’nai B’rith Justice Unit #5207 and the Broward County Crime Commission. The organization Leadership Broward presented Satz its annual "Profiles in Leadership: award in 2006. And in 2005, the National Association of Social Workers, Florida Chapter honored him with the local Elected Official of the Year award.
