= Nikolas Cruz =

American mass murderer (born 1998)

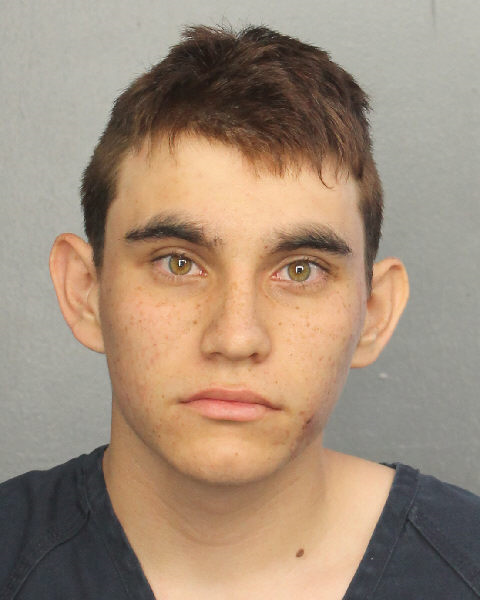
- Cruz's mugshot following his arrest
- Born: Nikolas Jacob Cruz; September 24, 1998 (age 28); Margate, Florida, U.S.
- Education: Marjory Stoneman Douglas High School (expelled)
- Known for: Perpetrator of the Parkland high school shooting
- Status: Incarcerated in Florida
- Motive: Disputed: Revenge for perceived social rejection (prosecution); Brain dysfunctions caused by fetal alcohol spectrum disorder (defense); Declining mental health and depression (defense); Attempt to ruin Valentine's Day (self-declared)
- Convictions: Premeditated first-degree murder (17 counts); Attempted first-degree murder (17 counts)
- Penalty: 34 consecutive life sentences without the possibility of parole

Details
- Date: February 14, 2018
- Country: United States
- State: Florida
- Locations: Parkland, Broward County
- Targets: Students and staff at Marjory Stoneman Douglas High School
- Killed: 17
- Injured: 17
- Weapon: Smith & Wesson M&P15 Sport II semi-automatic rifle

Nikolas Jacob Cruz (born September 24, 1998) is an American mass shooter who perpetrated the Parkland high school shooting, one of the deadliest school shootings in the United States. On February 14, 2018, Cruz killed seventeen people, including fourteen students and three staff members, while injuring seventeen others, at Marjory Stoneman Douglas High School. In November 2022, Cruz was sentenced to life imprisonment without the possibility of parole. It remains the deadliest high school shooting by a lone shooter in the United States.

Cruz had been known for his behavioral problems since preschool, and as a teenager on social media, he shared his obsessions with mass shootings and expressed racist, sexist, antisemitic, xenophobic, and homophobic views. He was a member of the Junior Reserve Officers' Training Corps. He legally purchased various firearms before the shooting.

== Early life ==
Cruz was born to Brenda Norma Woodard (June 25, 1956 – August 23, 2021) on September 24, 1998, in Margate, Florida. Woodard was described as a career criminal who had once been arrested for attempting to buy crack cocaine while pregnant with her son. His biological father's identity is unknown. Nikolas was placed in an orphanage after his birth and was adopted by Roger and Lynda Cruz. Both adoptive parents died before Cruz finished high school: Roger died at age 67 on August 11, 2004; and Lynda at age 68 on November 1, 2017. Cruz was fully orphaned three months before the shooting. Since his adoptive mother's death, he had been living with relatives and friends.

Cruz was a member of the Junior Reserve Officers' Training Corps and had received multiple awards including academic achievement for "maintaining an A grade in JROTC and Bs in other subjects", according to CNN. He was also a member of his school's varsity air rifle team. At the time of the shooting, he was enrolled in a GED program and employed at a local Dollar Tree.

== Behavioral issues and social media ==
Cruz had behavioral issues since preschool, and was eligible for special education services alongside an IEP. According to The Washington Post, he was "well known to school and mental health authorities and was entrenched in the process for getting students help rather than referring them to law enforcement". Psychiatrist Dr. Stephen E. Moskowitz diagnosed Cruz with attention deficit hyperactivity disorder (ADHD) and oppositional defiant disorder (ODD). Cruz was transferred between schools (including Marjory Stoneman Douglas High School) six times in three years in an effort to deal with these problems. In 2014, he was transferred to a school for children with emotional or learning disabilities. There were reports that he made threats against other students.

Cruz returned to Stoneman Douglas High School two years later but was expelled in 2017 for disciplinary reasons. As he could not be expelled from the Broward County school system completely, he was transferred to alternative placement. The school administration had circulated an email to teachers, warning that Cruz had made threats against other students. The school banned him from wearing a backpack on campus.

Psychiatrists recommended an involuntary admission of Cruz to a residential treatment facility, starting in 2013. The Florida Department of Children and Families investigated him in September 2016 for Snapchat posts in which he cut both his arms and said he planned to buy a gun. At this time, a school resource officer suggested he undergo an involuntary psychiatric examination under the provisions of the Baker Act. Two guidance counselors agreed, but a mental institution did not. State investigators reported he had depression, autism, and attention deficit hyperactivity disorder (ADHD), and had a history of attempting suicide. However, psychologist Frederick M. Kravitz later testified that Cruz was never diagnosed with autism. In their assessment, the investigators concluded he was "at low risk of harming himself or others". He had previously received mental health treatment, but had not received treatment in the year leading up to the shooting.

The school district conducted an assessment of the handling of Cruz. According to their redacted report, which was reviewed in August 2018 by The New York Times, The Daily Beast, and other media, a year before the shooting, Cruz had sought help from education specialists, as his grades at Stoneman Douglas were declining. He was an eighteen-year-old junior, and met with the specialists with his mother. The specialists recommended that he transfer to another school, Cross Creek School in Pompano Beach, where he had done well before, but he wanted to graduate with his class at Stoneman Douglas, and rejected this option, as a legal adult. He was advised that if he stayed, he would no longer be able to access special education services, but this was incorrect. A few months later, he withdrew because of failing grades. After that, Cruz requested to go to Cross Creek, but he was told a new assessment was needed, delaying action, and the request was denied.

Broward County Sheriff Scott Israel described Cruz's online profiles and accounts as "very, very disturbing". They contained pictures and posts of him with a variety of weapons, including long knives, a shotgun, a pistol, and a BB gun. Police said that he held "extremist" views; social media accounts that were thought to be linked to him contained anti-black and anti-Muslim slurs. YouTube comments linked to him include "I wanna die Fighting killing shit ton of people", and threats against police officers. Cruz idolized many different infamous mass murderers, such as Eric Harris and Dylan Klebold, Seung-Hui Cho, James Eagan Holmes, and Elliot Rodger, and regularly researched well-known mass shootings by reading Wikipedia and watching documentaries.

In February 2017, Cruz legally purchased an AR-15–style semi-automatic rifle from a Coral Springs gun store, after having passed the required background check. Before the purchase, he had similarly obtained several other firearms, including at least one shotgun and several other rifles. At the time of the shooting, in Florida, it was legal for 18-year-olds to purchase firearms from federally licensed dealers, including the rifle allegedly used in the shooting. The minimum age requirement has since been raised to 21.

Items recovered by police at the scene included gun magazines with swastikas carved in them. One student claimed that Cruz had drawn a swastika and the words "I hate niggers" on his backpack. CNN reported that Cruz was in a private Instagram group chat where he expressed racist, antisemitic, xenophobic, and homophobic views. Cruz said that he hated "jews, niggers, immigrants" and frequently discussed the weapons that he owned. At one point, Cruz said "I think I am going to kill people" in the group chat, although he later claimed that he was joking.

A former classmate said Cruz had anger management issues and often joked about guns and gun violence, which included threats of shooting up establishments. The brother of a 2016 graduate said that Cruz was "super stressed out all the time and talked about guns a lot and tried to hide his face". A student who was enrolled at the school at the time of the shooting said, "I think everyone had in their minds if anybody was going to do it, it was going to be him." A classmate who was assigned to work with him in sophomore year said, "He told me how he got kicked out of two private schools. He was held back twice. He had aspirations to join the military. He enjoyed hunting." A student's mother said that he also bragged about killing animals. A neighbor said his mother would call the police over to the house to try to talk some sense into him.

== Earlier warnings to law enforcement ==
Sheriff Scott Israel said that his office received 23 calls about Cruz during the previous decade. CNN used a public records request to obtain a sheriff's office log, which showed that from 2008 to 2017, at least 45 calls were made in reference to Cruz, his brother, or the family home combined. On February 5, 2016, the calls included an anonymous tip that Cruz had threatened to shoot up the school, and a tip on November 30, 2017, that he might be a "school shooter in the making" and that he collected knives and guns. On September 23, 2016, a peer counselor notified the school resource officer of his suicide attempt and intent to buy a gun, and the school indicated it would do a "threat assessment".

In September 2016, three people—a sheriff's deputy who worked as a resource officer at Stoneman Douglas, and two of the school's counselors—stated that Cruz should be committed for mental evaluation.

On September 24, 2017, a person with the username "nikolas cruz" posted a comment to a YouTube video that read, "Im [sic] going to be a professional school shooter." The person who uploaded the video to YouTube reported the comment to the FBI. According to agent Robert Lasky, the agency conducted database reviews but was unable to track down the individual who made the threatening comment.

On January 5, 2018, less than two months before the shooting, the FBI received a tip on its Public Access Line from a person who was close to Cruz. On February 16, two days after the shooting, the agency released a statement that detailed this information. According to the statement, "The caller provided information about Cruz's gun ownership, desire to kill people, erratic behavior, and disturbing social media posts, as well as the potential of him conducting a school shooting." After conducting an investigation, the FBI said the tip line did not follow protocol when the information was not forwarded to the Miami Field Office, where investigative steps would have been taken. The FBI opened a probe into the tip line's operations.

The response by Sheriff Israel and other members of the Broward County Sheriff's Office to the numerous red flags and warnings about Cruz has been the subject of scrutiny. In the days following the shooting, calls for Israel's resignation intensified as more information that alluded to the department's inaction was revealed. Israel refused to resign in the immediate aftermath of the shooting, saying during an interview with CNN, "I've given amazing leadership to this agency" while denying responsibility for the actions of his deputies. This culminated in Governor Ron DeSantis removing Israel from his role as Sheriff and replacing him with Gregory Tony.

== Parkland high school shooting ==
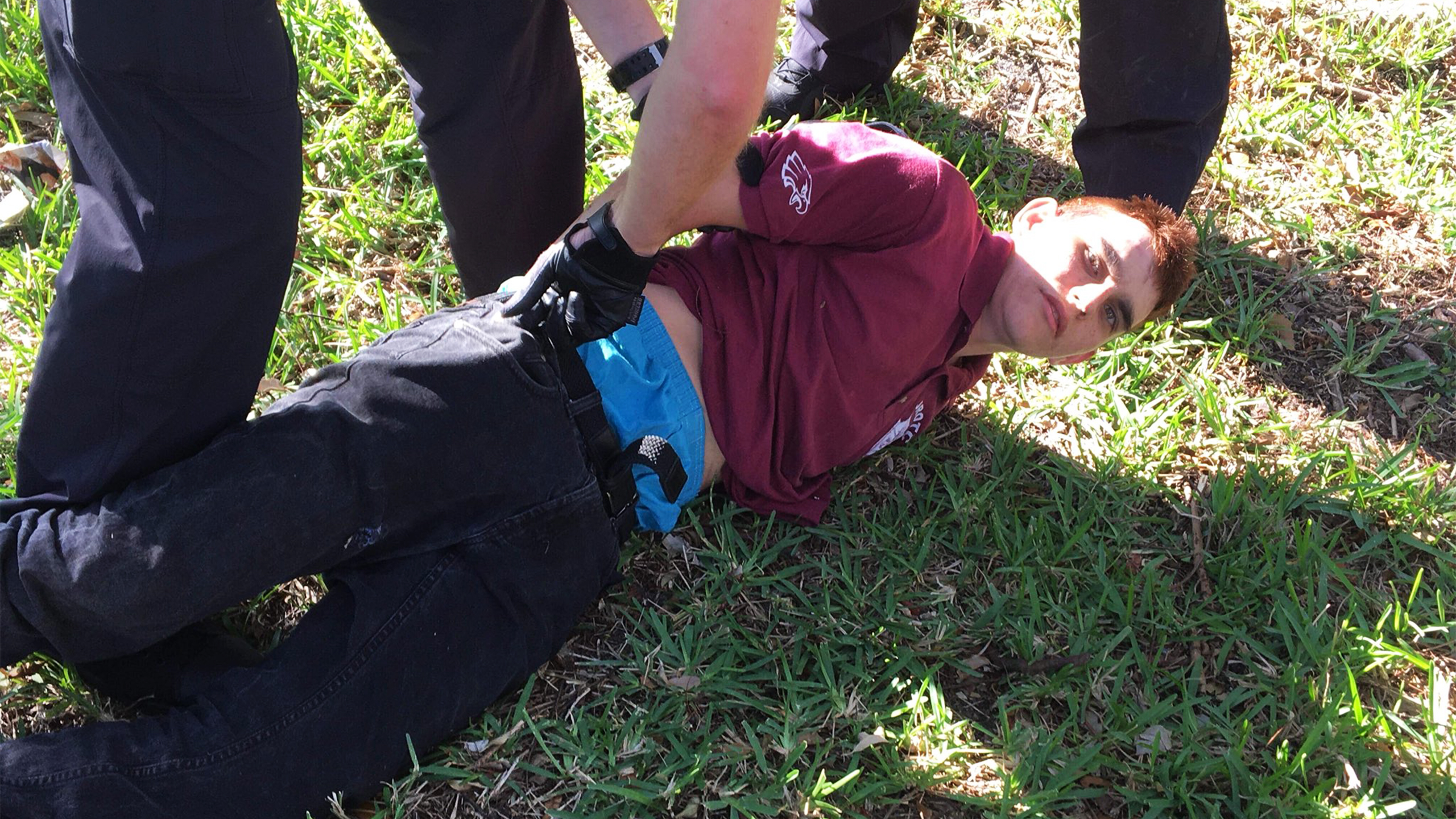
Cruz during his arrest

On February 14, 2018, Cruz opened fire on students and staff at Marjory Stoneman Douglas High School, murdering 17 people (Note: 14 students and three staff members) and injuring 17 others. Cruz, a former student at the school, fled the scene on foot by blending in with other students and was arrested without incident approximately one hour and twenty minutes later in nearby Coral Springs.

Cruz told a psychologist that he committed the shooting on Valentine's Day because he believed that no one loved him.

== Legal proceedings ==
Cruz's initial arraignment (3:02)

=== Arraignment ===
At his initial arraignment the day after the shootings, Cruz was charged with 17 counts of premeditated murder and held without bond. According to an affidavit by the sheriff's office, Cruz confessed to the shooting. It was also claimed Cruz told officers that he brought additional loaded magazines hidden in a backpack.

Cruz was placed on suicide watch in an isolation cell (solitary confinement) after the arraignment. Lead defense counsel Gordon Weekes asked Broward Circuit Judge Elizabeth Scherer to recuse herself, claiming that her previous comments and rulings showed favoritism toward the prosecution, which would prevent Cruz from receiving a fair trial. She disagreed and declined the request on February 26.

=== 2018 ===
On March 7, 2018, a grand jury indicted Cruz on a total of 34 charges: 17 counts of first-degree murder and 17 counts of attempted first-degree murder. He was arraigned on March 13, and the prosecution filed notice of their intent to seek the death penalty. They said they could prove five of the aggravating factors that qualify a murder for the death penalty in Florida. Cruz declined to enter a plea, so Scherer entered "not guilty" on his behalf. The defense had earlier offered a guilty plea if the death penalty was taken off the table, and reiterated it immediately before it was refused.

During the week of April 8–12, 2018, Scherer included a three-page letter from a Minnesotan into the court record of the case. The letter was addressed to the judge and claimed that research into Cruz's past led the writer to believe that Cruz had a developmental disability and that he was "fearful of other people and was threatened by bullies." The letter ended by claiming that Cruz appeared to be consumed by sadness and depression.

The same week, a hearing was held to determine if Cruz was entitled to a public defender. His attorney, court-appointed public defender Howard Finkelstein, asked the court to wait until the probate case involving Cruz's late mother's estate was concluded and Cruz's net worth could be determined, as Cruz would have only been entitled to a public defender had he been unable to afford a private attorney.

According to the Broward County Sheriff's Office, Cruz attacked a jail officer on the night of November 13, 2018. The following day, he was charged with aggravated assault on an officer, battery against an officer, and use of an "electric or chemical weapon against an officer". The officer who was allegedly attacked by Cruz had asked him to "not drag his sandals on the ground" while he was walking in the jail's dayroom. It was claimed Cruz responded by "displaying his middle finger" and striking the officer in the face. He also grabbed the stun gun out of the deputy's holster. The weapon discharged during the brawl before the deputy regained control and Cruz was placed in solitary confinement. Cruz appeared at an initial hearing on the assault charges, where bail was set at $200,000.

=== 2019 ===
On April 24, 2019, a determination was made that Cruz and his half-brother Zachary would share the proceeds of a MetLife insurance policy valued at $864,929. This would make Cruz ineligible for representation by the public defender's office, and the office therefore asked to be removed from his case on that date.

Scherer ruled on July 26 that Cruz's confession would be released to the public, adding on August 3 that the Broward school district's report on Cruz would also be released, with some redactions to protect Cruz's privacy rights. The confession was released on August 6. On August 8, a video of Cruz's confession filmed by the Broward County Sheriff's Office was published by TMZ. Cruz can be heard crying near the end of the video, and saying "kill me" to the camera.

=== 2020 ===
Cruz's trial, initially scheduled to begin on January 27, 2020, was originally delayed until mid-year to allow his lawyers more time to build their case. The case was then delayed again due to the COVID-19 pandemic; the case was expected to go to trial in September 2021. However, a start date for the trial was not set.

=== 2021 ===
Before the trial, the judge, Elizabeth Scherer, ruled that the use of "derogatory words" to refer to Cruz would not be allowed from prosecutors or witnesses during the trial, saying that it would not be feasible to create an "exhaustive list of words" that should not be used to describe Cruz. However, Judge Scherer also ruled against the defense in the use of some words, ruling that Cruz can be called "killer", "school shooter" or "murderer" as she deemed those words "normal to describe particular facts."

On October 14, a trial was scheduled for the following day, where it was reported that Cruz would plead guilty to the battery charge. Judge Scherer stated she would hold a hearing on October 20, where Cruz planned to plead guilty to all counts relating to the shooting to avoid the death penalty.

On October 20, Cruz pleaded guilty to all charges, including murder and attempted murder. Cruz made a statement after pleading guilty in which he expressed remorse for his crimes and asked the victims' families to decide his fate.

=== 2022 ===
Cruz's death penalty trial began July 18, 2022, and was presided over by Judge Scherer. On July 27, 2022, prosecutors presented the jurors digital evidence in their investigation. Jurors were presented with an 18-page list of search queries from various Google accounts. "how to become a school shooter", "Why I want to kill woman", and "pumped up kicks columbine high school" (a reference to the song "Pumped Up Kicks"). On August 4, 2022, the prosecution rested its case. On August 20, 2022, the Sun Sentinel released drawings written by Cruz in prison, which he had created in May. In the drawings, he blamed his ex-girlfriend's new boyfriend for making him do the shooting, who Cruz claimed sexually humiliated him on Instagram before the attack. Tony Montalto and his son Anthony Montalto III, the respective father and brother of victim Gina Montalto, referred to Cruz as a "murdering bastard"; while Michael Schulman, the father of victim Scott Biegel, said that his wish for his 70th birthday was to hear word that Cruz had been killed in prison.

The defense presented the jurors evidence and expert testimony that Cruz suffered from brain damage and disabilities resulting from his birth mother smoking, drinking alcohol and using various illegal drugs during her pregnancy with him and failure by the state and the school and other sources to get him proper treatment. It was also alleged by Cruz that he was repeatedly molested and raped at age nine by a twelve-year-old neighbor. In a rebuttal, an expert witness for the prosecution testified that Cruz faked fetal alcohol syndrome in a psychiatric evaluation and diagnosed him with both antisocial and borderline personality disorder.

The defense team for Cruz rested their case on September 14, 2022. The prosecution's rebuttal began on September 27, 2022, and ended on September 29, 2022. Cruz's Google and YouTube search history were presented to the court, showing searches of child pornography, rape, racism, Nazism, misogyny and killing animals. Closing arguments were delivered on October 11, 2022.

On October 13, 2022, the jury recommended that Cruz be sentenced to life imprisonment without the possibility of parole. While the jury found that the state had proven beyond a reasonable doubt the aggravating factors on all counts, they were not unanimous on whether the aggravating factors outweighed the mitigating factors. (Note: According to the jury foreman, nine out of twelve jurors recommended the death penalty.)

Nearly all of the murdered victims' families expressed anger and extreme disappointment toward the verdict, stating in their victim impact statements that he deserved the death penalty. Other points of contention from the victims were the perceived improper conduct of Cruz's lawyers during the trial as well as the unanimity required by Florida law to impose the death penalty as opposed to a majority vote. Florida governor Ron DeSantis, who also criticized the jury's recommendation, called for changes to the law. In April 2023, DeSantis signed a bill allowing juries to recommend the death penalty in capital cases on an 8–4 vote, among other measures.

On November 2, 2022, Cruz was sentenced to 34 consecutive life sentences without the possibility of parole, one each for the total number of victims murdered and wounded by Cruz.

=== 2024 ===
In June 2024, Cruz settled a civil lawsuit with shooting victim Anthony Borges, granting Borges rights to Cruz's name so that Cruz cannot grant interviews or make any agreement with film producers or authors without Borges's permission. Borges's lawyer said the objective was to take power and control from Cruz so he "cannot inflict further torture on his victims from jail". Cruz also agreed to posthumously donate his brain to science.

In August 2024, parents of murdered students Luke Hoyer, Alaina Petty, and Meadow Pollack, each reached $50 million settlements with Cruz while wounded student Maddy Wilford agreed to a $40 million settlement.

== Post conviction ==
Cruz's location within the Florida Department of Corrections remains a mystery. The State of Florida has refused to disclose Cruz's location. The South Florida Sun Sentinel reported that "Cruz's own lawyers said the jury's act of mercy stood in stark contrast to the defendant's own actions at the school, but some family members of the victims openly wished for the gunman's fellow inmates to do what the state now cannot — make Cruz pay for his crimes with his life."
