= Freedom of information legislation (Florida) =

The open government laws in Florida are focused on three areas:

- Statutory public records (codified at Fla. Stat. secs. 119.01 to 119.15),
- Statutory public meetings (the Florida Sunshine Law, codified at Fla. Stat. secs. 286.011 to 286.012),
- Judicial access decisional law.

== Open records ==
The Florida Public Records Law states,

it is the policy of this state that all state, county, and municipal records shall at all times be open for a personal inspection by any person.

— Fla. Stat. sec. 119.01(1)

The statute expansively defines "public record" to include all

documents, papers, letters, maps, books, tapes, photographs, films, sound recordings, data processing software, or other material, regardless of physical form, characteristics or means of transmission, made or received pursuant to law or ordinance or in connection with the transaction of official business by any agency.

— Fla. Stat. sec. 119.011(1)

With equal breadth, the law defines "agency" as

any state, county district, authority, or municipal officer, department division, board, bureau, commission, or other separate unit of government created or established by law ... and any other public or private agency, partnership, corporation, or business entity acting on behalf of any public agency.

— Fla. Stat. sec. 119.001(2)

A "public record" of an agency is subject to a broad legislated public right of inspection:

[e]very person who has custody of a public record shall permit the record to be inspected and examined by any person desiring to do so, at any reasonable time, under reasonable conditions, and under supervision by the custodian of the public record or the custodian's designee. The custodian shall furnish a copy or a certified copy of the record upon payment of the fee prescribed by law ...

— Section 119.07(1)(a)

Furthermore, Sunshine Review notes that,

Going back to 1905, before the law was formalized, Florida courts have held that it is not up to the government to determine the use to which a person might put public documents once copies are received. [State ex rel. Davis v. McMillan]

=== Exemptions ===
The Florida Supreme Court has held that only statutory exemptions from the inspections provision of Chapter 119 may be recognized, Wait v. Florida Power & Light; although courts must give effect to competing constitutional rights where inspection would otherwise compromise them. Florida Freedom Newspapers v. McCrary.

The exact number of statutory exemptions to the open records law is hard to assess, but estimates exceed 200. In response to criticisms that Florida's public records law had been undermined by the many exemptions, the Florida Legislature enacted the Open Government Sunset Review Act of 1995. Fla. Stat. § 119.15. This "Sunset" law provides for the periodic repeal of all exemptions, and mandates periodic review of the specific criteria which should be considered when reviewing the exemptions.

Unless the legislative review demonstrates a compelling interest in retaining a particular exemption that has been enacted and the legislature reenacts the exemption, it is repealed automatically.

The 1995 Sunshine Review Act incorporates the provisions of Section 119.15 as the criteria by which legislators should review Sunshine Law exemptions. Fla. Stat. § 286.0111. Under the 1995 Act, an exemption must fit within one of three categories of identifiable public purposes, and must be seen as compelling enough to override the strong presumption of openness articulated in Fla. Stat. § 119.15(2).

Since the Sunshine Review Act, the legislature has exhibited a resolve to streamline exemptions, allowing confidentiality only to the extent necessary to protect important competing values.

== Judicial access decisional law ==
Similarly, access to judicial records and proceedings has been broadly granted by Florida courts.

== See also ==
- Florida Man
