= Parkland, Florida =

- City
- Seal
- Motto: "Environmentally Proud"
- Coordinates: 26°19′07″N 80°14′21″W
- Country: United States
- State: Florida
- County: Broward
- Incorporated: July 10, 1963

Government
  - Type: Council-Manager

Area
  - City: 14.35 sq mi (37.16 km^{2})
  - Land: 12.50 sq mi (32.38 km^{2})
  - Water: 1.84 sq mi (4.77 km^{2})
- Elevation: 13 ft (4.0 m)

Population (2020)
  - City: 34,670
  - Density: 2,772.9/sq mi (1,070.61/km^{2})
  - Metro: 6,166,488
- Time zone: UTC-5 (EST)
  - Summer (DST): UTC-4 (EDT)
- ZIP Codes: 33067, 33073, 33076
- Area codes: 754, 954
- FIPS code: 12-55125
- GNIS feature ID: 2404482
- Website: www.cityofparkland.org

Parkland is a city in northern Broward County, Florida, United States. It is a suburb of Fort Lauderdale and located 30 miles (48 km) north of the city. As of the 2020 census, the population of Parkland was 34,670. Parkland is part of the Miami metropolitan area, which was home to 6,166,488 people in 2020.

Parkland's zoning laws are designed to protect the "park-like" character of the city. There were no stores or traffic lights in Parkland until the mid-1990s and early 2000s when large neighborhood developments (Heron Bay and Parkland Isles) were built. The city of Parkland has been known since its early days for its assortment of park spaces and its emphasis on environmental preservation and equestrianism, to the point that over the first decade of Parkland's existence horses had outnumbered the town's population.

== History ==
On July 10, 1963, a city charter was passed upon legislative approval after actively supported through the Florida State House of Representatives as House bill 2079, guided through the Florida House with the aid of Representative Emerson Alsworth Esq., from the original idea of a city charter for an unincorporated rural ranch style open spaced town of founder and local farmer, rancher, veteran, and politician Bruce Blount. Early on, Blount put up tracts of his private land, calling his town BBB Ranches, in his original attempts for official recognition. Rep. Alsworth would facilitate this process of approval by adding in the bill the name of the proposed town as Parkland, a description befitting Blount's initial proposal of an undeveloped town out of the way of the building boon of Broward County. And after a passing vote in July, on August 12, 1963, Parkland was officially recognized as a city of the state of Florida, by C. Farris Bryant, the Governor of Florida. Blount would go on to be the inaugural mayor of Parkland, previously having served as mayor and city commissioner of Pompano Beach.

=== 2018 school shooting ===
On February 14, 2018, at the site of Marjory Stoneman Douglas High School, the lone public high school in Parkland, became the scene of a deadly mass shooting. The Perpetrator, 19-year old Nikolas Cruz, a former student of the school, would shoot and kill 17 students, and injure another 17, being apprehended by police around an hour later. Currently, it is the deadliest mass shooting at a high school in U.S. history, surpassing the 1999 Columbine High School Shooting, and the fifth deadliest act of gun violence at a school in the United States.

== Geography ==
According to the United States Census Bureau, the city has a total area of 12.8 square miles (33.2 km^{2}), of which 12.3 square miles (31.9 km^{2}) is land and 0.50 square miles (1.3 km^{2}) (3.97%) is water. The northern boundary of Parkland coincides with the border between Broward and Palm Beach counties. West Boca Raton, an unincorporated area of Palm Beach County that extends west of Boca Raton's city limits, lies to the north. Coconut Creek lies to the east, Coral Springs lies to the south and the west is bounded by the Everglades.

=== Climate ===
Parkland has a tropical climate, similar to the climate found in much of the Caribbean. It is part of the only region in the 48 contiguous states that falls under that category. More specifically, it generally has a tropical rainforest climate (Köppen climate classification: Af), bordering a tropical monsoon climate (Köppen climate classification: Am).

== Demographics ==
Historical population
Census	Pop.	Note	%±
1970	165		—
1980	545		230.3%
1990	3,558		552.8%
2000	13,835		288.8%
2010	23,962		73.2%
2020	34,670		44.7%
U.S. Decennial Census

=== Racial and ethnic composition ===
Parkland racial composition (Hispanics excluded from racial categories) (NH = Non-Hispanic)
Race	Pop 2010	Pop 2020	% 2010	% 2020
White (NH)	17,506	20,756	73.06%	59.87%
Black or African American (NH)	1,504	2,067	6.28%	5.96%
Native American or Alaska Native (NH)	16	33	0.07%	0.10%
Asian (NH)	1,396	3,071	5.83%	8.86%
Pacific Islander or Native Hawaiian (NH)	3	13	0.01%	0.04%
Some other race (NH)	89	373	0.37%	1.08%
Two or more races/Multiracial (NH)	335	1,951	1.40%	5.63%
Hispanic or Latino (any race)	3,113	6,406	12.99%	18.48%
Total	23,962	34,670		

=== 2020 census ===
As of the 2020 census, Parkland had a population of 34,670. The median age was 40.3 years. 29.7% of residents were under the age of 18 and 11.8% of residents were 65 years of age or older. For every 100 females there were 95.9 males, and for every 100 females age 18 and over there were 93.4 males age 18 and over.

100.0% of residents lived in urban areas, while 0.0% lived in rural areas.

There were 10,848 households in Parkland, of which 52.2% had children under the age of 18 living in them. Of all households, 74.6% were married-couple households, 7.7% were households with a male householder and no spouse or partner present, and 14.2% were households with a female householder and no spouse or partner present. About 10.0% of all households were made up of individuals and 5.2% had someone living alone who was 65 years of age or older.

There were 11,424 housing units, of which 5.0% were vacant. The homeowner vacancy rate was 2.1% and the rental vacancy rate was 7.2%.

Racial composition as of the 2020 census
Race	Number	Percent
White	22,361	64.5%
Black or African American	2,112	6.1%
American Indian and Alaska Native	45	0.1%
Asian	3,089	8.9%
Native Hawaiian and Other Pacific Islander	13	0.0%
Some other race	1,235	3.6%
Two or more races	5,815	16.8%
Hispanic or Latino (of any race)	6,406	18.5%

=== 2016 estimates ===
According to a 2016 estimate, the median income for a household in the city was $131,340, and the estimated median house value was $596,212. Males had a median income of $103,942 versus $81,425 for females. The per capita income for the city was $56,793. About 2.0% of families and .4% of the population were below the poverty line, including 3.2% of those under age 18 and none of those age 65 or over.

=== 2010 census ===
As of the 2010 United States census, there were 23,962 people, 7,073 households, and 6,084 families residing in the city.

=== 2000 census ===
In 2000, the city population was spread out, with 35.1% under the age of 18, 4.3% from 18 to 24, 32.8% from 25 to 44, 24.0% from 45 to 64, and 3.8% who were 65 years of age or older. The median age was 36 years. For every 100 females, there were 99.0 males. For every 100 females age 18 and over, there were 93.7 males.

As of 2000, 82.79% of inhabitants spoke English at home, while 11.48% spoke Spanish, of 2.03% spoke Italian, and 1.20% spoke German.

== Government ==
Parkland elects a five-member City Commission.

Parkland vote in presidential elections
Year	Democratic	Republican	Third Parties
2016	51.17% 7,839	46.11% 7,063	2.72% 417
2012	46.88% 4,954	52.70% 5,569	0.42% 45
2008	52.15% 5,178	47.41% 4,707	0.44% 44
2004	47.72% 2,632	51.59% 2,845	0.69% 38

== Education ==
Broward County Public Schools operates public schools in Parkland.

=== Public high school ===
- Marjory Stoneman Douglas High School serves almost all of the city limits, while small sections are zoned to Coral Springs High School

In addition, the community is in the service area of the magnet school Pompano Beach High School.

=== Public middle school ===
- Westglades Middle School in Parkland serves almost all of the city limits, while small sections are zoned to Forest Glen Middle School in Coral Springs.

=== Public elementary schools ===
- Riverglades Elementary School
- Park Trails Elementary School
- Heron Heights Elementary School

Portions are zoned to Coral Park and Park Springs elementaries in Coral Springs.

=== Private primary schools ===
- Mary Help of Christians School (of the Roman Catholic Archdiocese of Miami)

== Notable people ==
- Caesar Bacarella, race car driver
- Nick Bilton, journalist, author, and filmmaker
- Alfonso Calderón Atienzar, activist against gun violence, survivor of the Stoneman Douglas High School shooting, and a founding member of the Never Again MSD movement
- Sarah Chadwick, activist against gun violence, survivor of the Stoneman Douglas High School shooting, and one of the leaders of the Never Again MSD movement
- Ashley Cooke, country music singer
- Jaclyn Corin, activist against gun violence and survivor of the Stoneman Douglas High School shooting
- Ryan Deitsch, student activist against gun violence and one of the founding members of the Never Again MSD movement who survived the Stoneman Douglas High School shooting
- Sam Deitsch, author and gun control activist who survived the Stoneman Douglas High School shooting
- Aalayah Eastmond, activist and advocate for gun violence prevention, social justice, and racial equality, and survivor of the Stoneman Douglas High School shooting
- X González, political activist who survived the 2018 shooting at Stoneman Douglas High School shooting and organized protests in response to it
- Fred Guttenberg, activist against gun violence whose daughter, Jaime Guttenberg, was murdered in the Parkland high school shooting
- David Hogg, gun control activist and survivor of the Stoneman Douglas High School shooting
- Lauren Hogg, activist against gun violence who survived the Stoneman Douglas High School shooting and sister of David Hogg
- Kyle Kashuv, conservative activist who survived the Stoneman Douglas High School shooting
- Cameron Kasky, activist and advocate against gun violence who co-founded Never Again MSD and March for Our Lives, and survived the Stoneman Douglas High School shooting
- Roberto Luongo, former NHL goalie for the Florida Panthers, has lived in Parkland since 2000
- Jared Moskowitz, U.S. representative and former Florida representative, Broward County commissioner, and Director of the Florida Division of Emergency Management
- Andrew Peeke, professional NHL ice hockey player
- George Poveromo, renowned saltwater angler and host of "World of Saltwater Fishing" on the Discovery Channel
- Anthony Rizzo, former professional baseball player
- Dara Torres, former competitive swimmer, who is a 12-time Olympic medalist
- Jon Weiner, ESPN radio host
- Alex Wind, activist against gun violence, one of the founding member of the Never Again MSD movement, and survivor of the Stoneman Douglas High School shooting
- XXXTentacion, rapper and singer, lived in Parkland from 2017 until his death
- Nikolas Cruz, perpetrator of the Stoneman Douglas High School shooting
- Ariana Greenblatt, actress
