= Parkland high school shooting =

2018 mass shooting in Florida, US

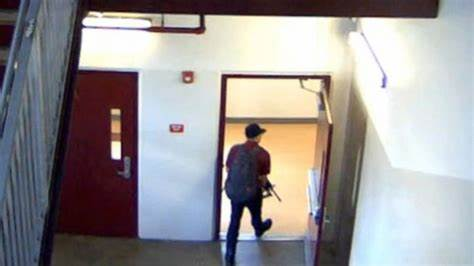
- Cruz stepping into the first-floor hallway after assembling his weapon
- Location: 26.3053°N 80.2683°W (shooting); 26.2897°N 80.2871°W (arrest) (Note: 4700 block of Wyndham Lakes Drive, Coral Springs.); Marjory Stoneman Douglas High School; Parkland, Florida, US
- Date: February 14, 2018; 8 years ago 2:21 – 2:27 p.m. (EST; UTC−05:00)
- Target: Students and staff at Marjory Stoneman Douglas High School
- Attack type: School shooting; mass shooting; mass murder
- Weapon: .223 Remington Smith & Wesson M&P15 semi-automatic rifle
- Deaths: 17
- Injuries: 17 (Note: Sources vary including Ernest Rospierski as the 18th injury.)
- Perpetrator: Nikolas Jacob Cruz
- Defender: Anthony Borges
- Motive: Disputed: Revenge for perceived social rejection (prosecution); Brain dysfunctions caused from fetal alcohol spectrum disorder (defense); Declining mental health and depression (defense); Attempt to ruin Valentine's Day (self-declared)
- Verdict: Cruz: Pleaded guilty; Scot Peterson (school resource officer): found not guilty of 11 criminal charges (Note: Acquitted of seven counts of child neglect, three counts of culpable negligence, and one count of perjury.)
- Convictions: 17 counts of premeditated first-degree murder, 17 counts of attempted first-degree murder
- Sentence: 34 consecutive life sentences without the possibility of parole
- Judge: Elizabeth Scherer

On February 14, 2018, 19-year-old Nikolas Jacob Cruz walked into his former school, Marjory Stoneman Douglas High School, in Parkland, Florida, and fatally shot seventeen people—fourteen students and three teachers—while wounding another seventeen. Cruz fled the scene on foot by blending in with the students and was arrested without incident approximately one hour and twenty minutes later in nearby Coral Springs. Police and prosecutors investigated "a pattern of disciplinary issues and unnerving behavior". The incident is the deadliest mass shooting at a high school in US history, surpassing the 1999 Columbine High School massacre.

Students at Parkland founded Never Again MSD, an advocacy group that lobbies for gun control. On March 9, Governor Rick Scott signed a bill that implemented new restrictions to Florida's gun laws and also allowed for the arming of teachers who were properly trained and the hiring of more school resource officers.

The Broward County Sheriff's Office received widespread criticism for its handling of the police response, both for not following up on multiple warnings about Cruz despite a lengthy record of threatening behavior and for staying outside the school instead of immediately confronting him. This led to the resignations of several police officers who responded to the scene, and the removal of Sheriff Scott Israel. A commission appointed by then-governor Scott to investigate the shooting condemned the police inaction and urged school districts across the state to adopt greater measures of security.

On October 20, 2021, Cruz pleaded guilty to all charges and apologized for his crimes. The prosecution sought the death penalty, and a four-month death penalty trial was expected to commence in January 2022. After suffering numerous delays, in part due to the COVID-19 pandemic, the trial commenced on July 18, 2022. On October 13, 2022, a jury unanimously agreed that Cruz was eligible for the death penalty, but deadlocked on whether it should be imposed, resulting in a recommendation to sentence him to life imprisonment without the possibility of parole. On November 2, 2022, Cruz was sentenced to life without parole, in accordance with a Florida law requiring the court not to depart from the jury's recommendation. The unanimity required to impose the death penalty has since been overturned by a bill signed by Governor Ron DeSantis, partly as a result of Cruz's sentencing.

== Incident ==
=== Context ===
The shooting took place at Marjory Stoneman Douglas High School in Parkland, Florida, an affluent suburb about 30 miles (48 km) northwest of Fort Lauderdale and 45 miles (72 km) northwest of Miami.

=== Immediately prior ===
On February 14, 2018, Nikolas Cruz, the shooter, was dropped off at the school by an Uber driver at 2:19 p.m., 20 minutes before dismissal time. According to a police report, Cruz was carrying a rifle case and a backpack. He concealed an AR-15–style semi-automatic rifle (Note: Smith & Wesson M&P15.) and multiple magazines. He was spotted and recognized by a campus monitor, who radioed a colleague that he was walking "purposefully" toward Building 12. The campus monitor did not declare a Code Red lockdown but sent a radio message to a colleague inside Building 12, which Cruz had entered. The school's policies did not specify clearly who could order a lockdown, and staff had been trained not to order a lockdown unless they saw a gun or heard shots being fired. (Note: The campus monitor who received the radio warning hid inside a janitor's closet after hearing shots being fired, and survived the attack.)

Cruz entered Building 12, (Note: Also known as the "freshman building" because it was originally built for use only by freshmen, it later became used for other grades as well.) a three-story structure containing 30 classrooms typically occupied by about 900 students and 30 teachers, at approximately 2:21 p.m.

Upon entering the building, Cruz rapidly assembled his weapon at the base of a stairwell adjacent to the first floor classrooms. As he did so, a student named Christopher McKenna encountered Cruz and Cruz informed him: "[You'd] better get out of here, something bad's about to happen." McKenna fled the building and notified staff members of the unfolding threat.

=== Mass shooting ===
As Cruz entered the first floor hallway, he saw and fatally shot three students—Martin Anguiano, Gina Montalto, and Luke Hoyer—who were in the hallway outside room 1215. They were killed at 2:21 p.m., and Cruz shot and wounded a fourth student in the hallway, 15-year-old Ashley Baez. He fired through the windows of four closed classroom doors, killing six more students and wounding thirteen others.

Due to gunshot reverberation within the hallways, the fire alarm within the building activated, causing confusion because there had been a fire drill earlier in the day. Students were unable to seek shelter at "hard corners"—areas of a classroom that people could safely hide at if a gunman peered through the window of a door—because many of the classrooms in Building 12 lacked one, and furniture otherwise obstructed potential safe spaces.

As the shooting unfolded, employees did not call a "Code Red" because of their confusion over who had the authority to do so. At about 2:21 p.m., a staff member eventually activated a lockdown, but only after discovering one body and hearing gunfire. An armed school resource officer of the Broward County Sheriff's Office was on campus when the shooting broke out, and he remained outside between Building 12 and the adjacent Building 7.

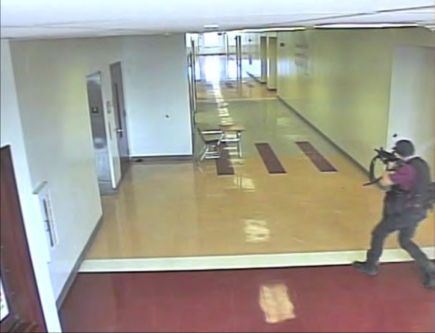
Cruz on the second floor

After killing two staff members near the first-floor stairwell, Cruz went to the second floor and fired into two empty classrooms. On the third floor, he shot and killed five students and another staff member, who all had been stranded in the hallway; he shot and injured three other students and two teachers. Next, he went into a teachers' lounge where he attempted but failed to shoot out the hurricane-resistant windows facing the yard in order to target students and staff fleeing below.

Cruz had carved swastikas onto the ammunition magazines that he left at the school, and two of those killed and another four who were injured were students in a Holocaust History class. The teacher, Ivy Schamis, was teaching a class lesson on combating hate when Cruz fired shots into her classroom. However, according to Schamis, Cruz was unaware that he was shooting into a class on the Holocaust.

After Cruz stopped shooting, he dropped his rifle on the third floor of the building and left the scene by blending in with fleeing students. He walked to a fast-food restaurant, stopping at a mall to get a soda on the way, and lingered before leaving on foot at 3:01 p.m.

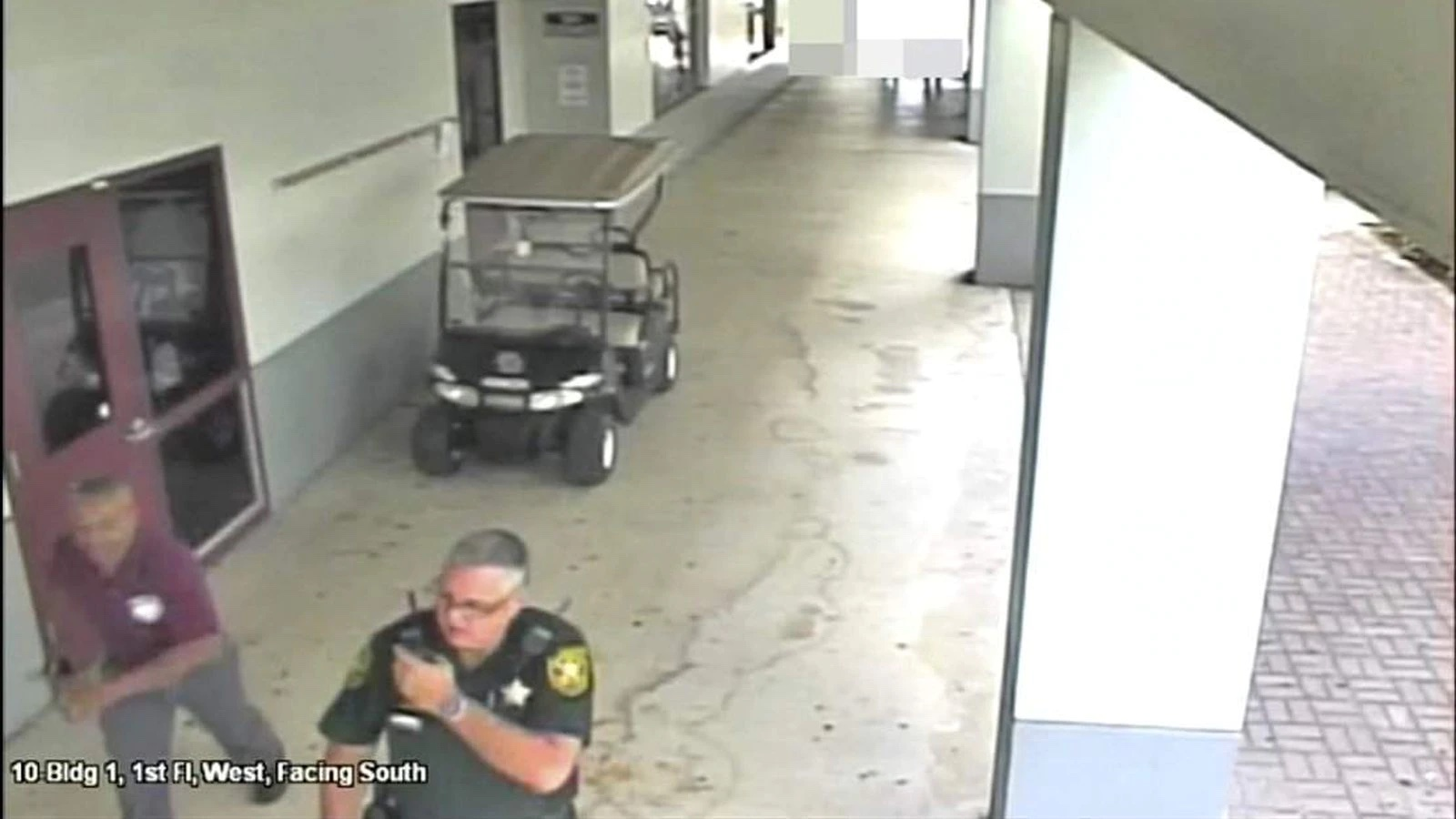
BCSO deputy Scot Peterson outside Building 12 during the shooting

Of the seventeen fatalities, fourteen were students and three were faculty members. Cruz fired 139 shots during the shooting: 70 on the first floor, 2 in the stairwell, 6 on the second floor, and 61 on the third floor.

=== Arrest ===
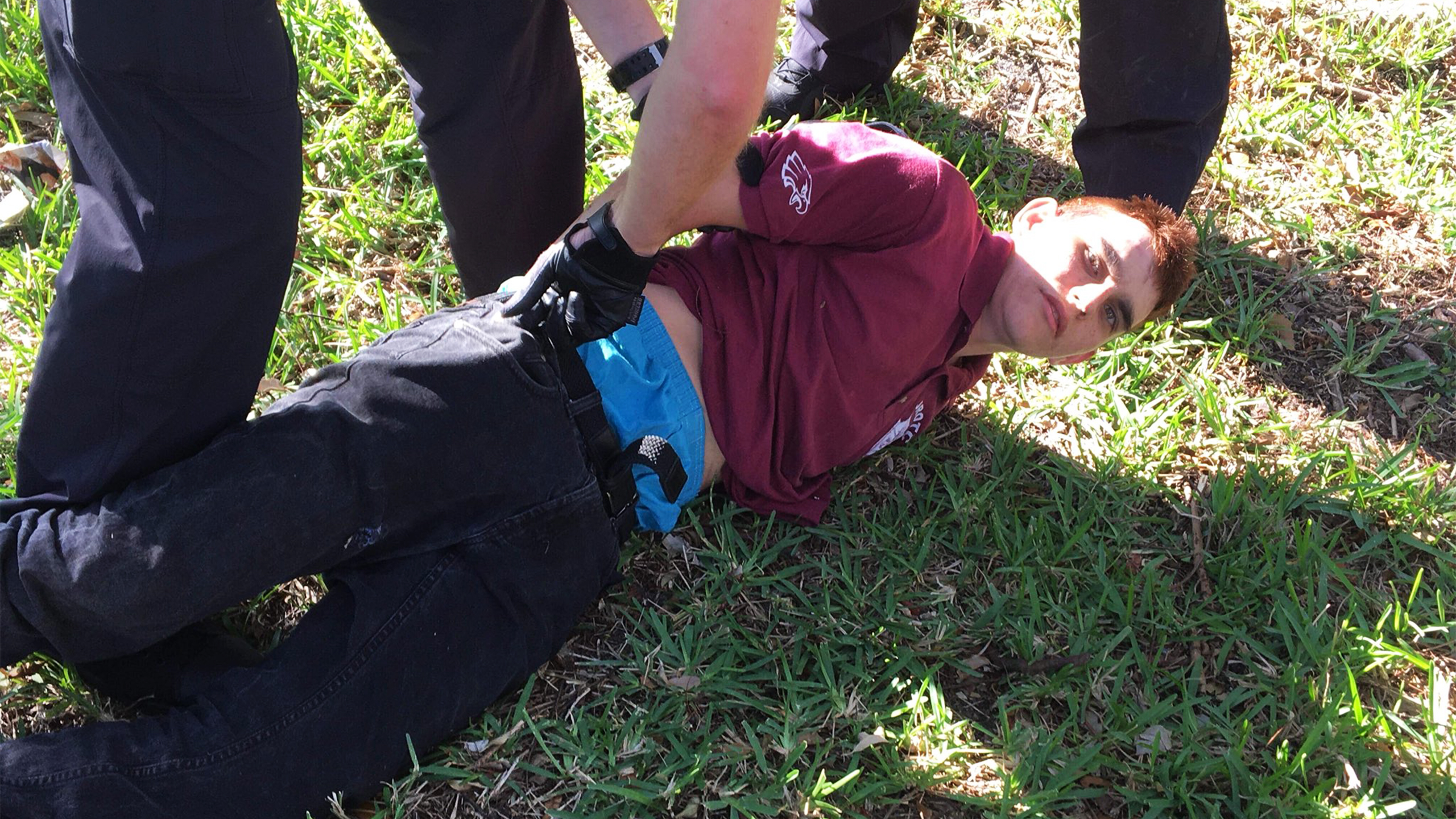
Cruz during his arrest in Coral Springs

At about 3:41 p.m., police stopped Cruz 2 miles (3.2 km) from the school in the Wyndham Lakes neighborhood of Coral Springs and arrested him as the suspected shooter. He was then taken to a hospital emergency room with "labored breathing." (Note: Called in as a gunshot wound, according to an emergency room doctor.) After 40 minutes, Cruz was released back into police custody and booked into the Broward County Jail.

The shooting lasted for about six minutes in total, and all of the victims were shot within just under four minutes. School surveillance camera video showed Cruz as the shooter, and he was also recognized by eyewitnesses. While SWAT paramedics were inside the building, additional paramedics from the local Fire-Rescue department repeatedly asked to enter the building. These requests were denied by the Broward Sheriff's Office, even after the suspect was arrested.

== Victims ==
Casualties

Killed on first floor:

- Alyssa Miriam Alhadeff (14)
- Martin Duque Anguiano (14)
- Nicholas Paul Dworet (17)
- Aaron Louis Feis (37)
- Christopher Brent Hixon (49)
- Luke Thomas Hoyer (15)
- Gina Rose Montalto (14)
- Alaina Joann Petty (14)
- Helena Freja Ramsay (17)
- Alexander Logan Schachter (14)
- Carmen Marie Schentrup (16)

Killed on third floor:

- Scott J. Beigel (35)
- Jaime Taylor Guttenberg (14)
- Cara Marie Loughran (14)
- Joaquin Oliver (17)
- Meadow Jade Pollack (18)
- Peter Wang (15)

Injured:

- Ashley Baez (15)
- Anthony Borges (15)
- Isabel Chequer (16)
- Justin Colton (14)
- Alexander Dworet (15)
- Samantha Fuentes (18)
- Samantha Grady (17)
- Marian Kabachenko (14)
- Kyle Laman (15)
- Samantha Mayor (17)
- William Olson (14)
- Stacey Lynn Lippel (50)
- Kheshava Mangapuram (14)
- Daniela Menescal (17)
- Ernest Rospierski (37) (Note: Sources vary including Ernest Rospierski as the 18th injury.)
- Genesis Valentin (15)
- Benjamin Wikander (17)
- Madeleine Wilford (17)

Seventeen people were killed, and seventeen more were wounded. Three of the wounded remained in critical condition the day after the shooting, and one remained by the second day.

=== Fatalities ===
Fourteen of the fatalities died inside the building; three others died in or en route to the hospital.

Geography teacher Scott Beigel was killed after he unlocked a classroom for students to enter and hide from Cruz. Aaron Feis, an assistant football coach and security guard, was killed as he entered the building in response to reports of the ongoing shooting. Chris Hixon, the school's athletic director, was killed as he ran toward the sound of the gunfire.

Student Peter Wang was last seen in his Junior Reserve Officers' Training Corps (JROTC) uniform, reportedly holding doors open so others could escape. At their respective funerals, Wang, Alaina Petty, and Martin Duque were all posthumously honored by the US Army with the ROTC Medal for Heroism, and Wang was buried in his JROTC Blues uniform. On February 20, Wang was posthumously admitted to the United States Military Academy.

Alyssa Alhadeff was the captain of the Parkland Soccer Club. On March 7, 2018 she was honored by the United States women's national soccer team prior to a game in Orlando. Her teammates and family were invited to the game and presented with official jerseys that featured her name.

Meadow Pollack was a senior who was shot four times; upon being initially wounded seconds after Cruz had fatally shot Scott Beigel, Pollack crawled toward a classroom door, where a 14-year-old freshman named Cara Loughran—also wounded by Cruz—had sought refuge. Cruz located Pollack and Loughran and discharged his weapon five more times, killing both girls.

=== Injuries and survivors ===
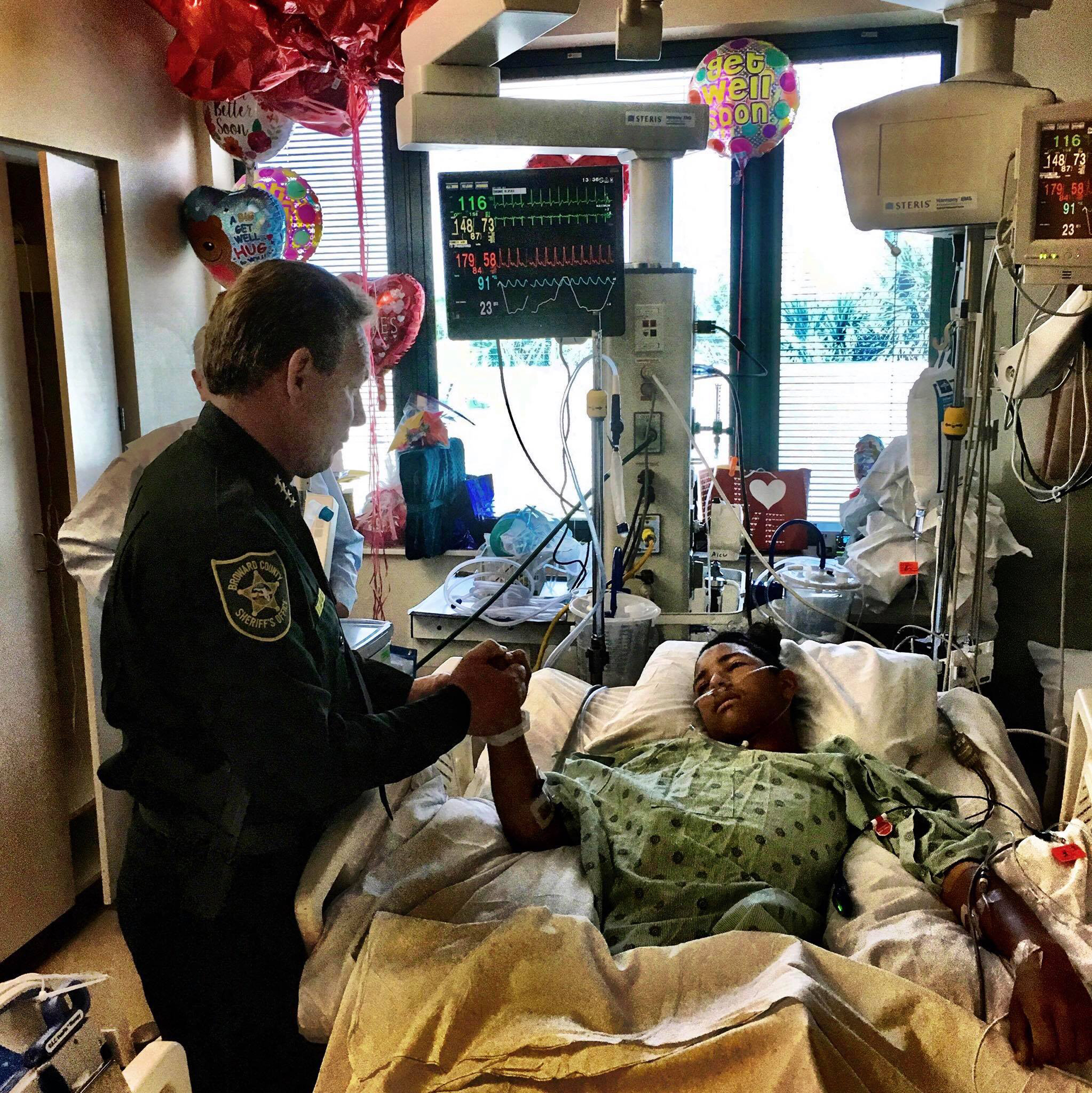
Sheriff Israel visits victim Anthony Borges

Sixteen students and two teachers were wounded in the shooting. The last victim to remain hospitalized, 15-year-old Anthony Borges, was discharged from the hospital on April 4. Borges was shot five times after reportedly attempting to barricade the door of a classroom. Upon his release, Borges issued a statement that criticized the actions of Broward Sheriff's deputies, Sheriff Scott Israel, and School Superintendent Robert Runcie. His family has filed notice of its intent to sue the school district for personal injury to cover costs related to his recovery. Borges was honored with a humanitarian award at the 2018 BET Awards.

Teacher Ivy Schamis was presented with USC Shoah Foundation's inaugural Stronger Than Hate Educator Award in 2019. During her acceptance speech at the award ceremony, Schamis honored victims Nicholas Dworet and Helena Ramsay, who died in her class during the shooting.

==== Suicides ====
Immediately after the shooting, trauma counselors met with teachers, students, and their families. Survivors of the shooting, teachers and students alike, have struggled with survivor's guilt and other symptoms of post-traumatic stress disorder (PTSD). On March 17, 2019, thirteen months after the shooting, 19-year-old Sydney Aiello, who survived the shooting, died by suicide. She was reportedly terrified of being in a classroom and also had been treated for survivor's guilt and PTSD. Less than one week later, on March 23, 2019, 16-year-old Calvin Desir, another survivor of the shooting, also died by suicide. In December 2025, nearly eight years after the shooting, Donovan Metayer committed suicide at age 26 because of trauma associated with the event; he had been suffering a "years-long battle with schizophrenia" according to his family.

== Perpetrator ==
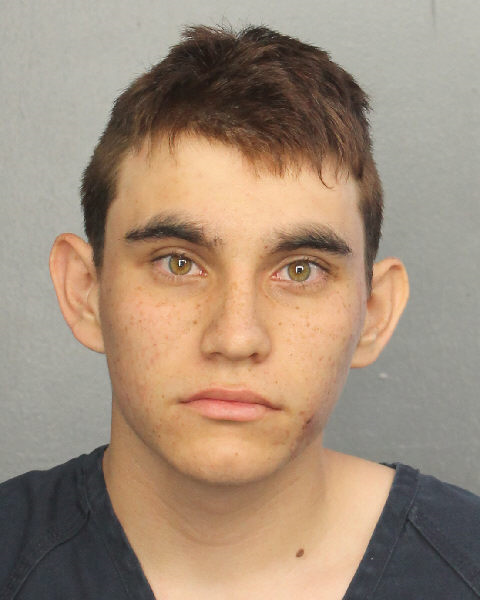
Mugshot of Nikolas Cruz

=== Summary ===
Nikolas Jacob Cruz was born on September 24, 1998, in Margate, Florida, and was adopted at birth by Lynda and Roger Cruz. Both his adoptive parents died when he was young: Roger at age 67 on August 11, 2004, when Cruz was 5; and Lynda at age 68 on November 1, 2017, leaving Cruz orphaned at age 19. This was three months before the shooting. Since his mother's death, he had been living with relatives and friends. At the time of the shooting, he was enrolled in a GED program and employed at a local Dollar Tree.

Cruz had behavioral issues since preschool, and was eligible for special education services alongside an IEP. According to The Washington Post, he was "entrenched in the process for getting students help rather than referring them to law enforcement". He was transferred between schools six times in three years in an effort to deal with these problems. Cruz returned to Stoneman Douglas High School two years later but was expelled in 2017 for disciplinary reasons. As he could not be expelled from the Broward County School system completely, he was transferred to alternative placement. A former classmate said Cruz had anger management issues and often joked about guns and gun violence, which included threats of shooting up establishments.

The Florida Department of Children and Families investigated him in September 2016 for Snapchat posts in which he cut both his arms and said he planned to buy a gun. At this time, a school resource officer suggested he undergo an involuntary psychiatric examination under the provisions of the Baker Act. Two guidance counselors agreed, but a mental institution did not. State investigators reported he had depression, autism, and attention deficit hyperactivity disorder (ADHD). However, psychologist Frederick M. Kravitz later testified that Cruz was never diagnosed with autism. In their assessment, they concluded he was "at low risk of harming himself or others". He had previously received mental health treatment, but had not received treatment in the year leading up to the shooting.

Broward County Sheriff Scott Israel described Cruz's online profiles and accounts as "very, very disturbing". They contained pictures and posts of him with a variety of weapons, including long knives, a shotgun, a pistol, and a BB gun. Police said that he held "extremist" views; social media accounts that were thought to be linked to him contained anti-black and anti-Muslim slurs. In February 2017, Cruz legally purchased an AR-15-style semi-automatic rifle from a Coral Springs gun store, after having passed the required background check. Prior to the purchase he had similarly obtained several other firearms, including at least one shotgun and several other rifles. At the time of the shooting, in Florida, it was legal for people as young as 18 to purchase guns from federally licensed dealers, including the rifle allegedly used in the shooting. The minimum age requirement has since been raised to 21.

=== Earlier warnings to law enforcement ===
Sheriff Scott Israel said that his office received 23 calls about Cruz during the previous decade, but this figure is in dispute. CNN used a public records request to obtain a sheriff's office log, which showed that from 2008 to 2017, at least 45 calls were made in reference to Cruz, his brother, or the family home. On February 5, 2016, the calls included an anonymous tip that Cruz had threatened to shoot up the school, and a tip on November 30, 2017, that he might be a "school shooter in the making" and that he collected knives and guns. On September 23, 2016, a peer counselor notified the school resource officer of his suicide attempt and intent to buy a gun, and the school indicated it would do a "threat assessment".

On January 5, 2018, less than one month before the shooting, the FBI received a tip on its Public Access Line from a person who was close to Cruz. On February 16, two days after the shooting, the agency released a statement that detailed this information. According to the statement, "The caller provided information about Cruz's gun ownership, desire to kill people, erratic behavior, and disturbing social media posts, as well as the potential of him conducting a school shooting." After conducting an investigation, the FBI said the tip line did not follow protocol when the information was not forwarded to the Miami Field Office, where investigative steps would have been taken. The FBI opened a probe into the tip line's operations.

The lack of response by Israel and other members of the Broward County Sheriff's Office to the numerous red flags and warnings about Cruz has been the subject of scrutiny.

== Legal proceedings ==
=== Criminal case ===
On October 20, 2021, Cruz pleaded guilty to all charges and apologized for his crimes. The prosecution sought the death penalty, and a four-month death penalty trial was expected to commence in January 2022. After numerous delays, in part due to the COVID-19 pandemic, the trial commenced on July 18, 2022. On October 13, 2022, a jury unanimously agreed that Cruz was eligible for the death penalty, but deadlocked on whether it should be imposed, resulting in a recommendation to sentence him to life imprisonment without the possibility of parole. On November 2, 2022, Cruz was sentenced to life without parole, in accordance with a Florida law requiring the court not to depart from the jury's recommendation. The unanimity required to impose the death penalty has since been overturned by a bill signed by Governor DeSantis, partly as a result of Cruz's sentencing.

=== Civil lawsuits ===
On May 23, 2018, the parents of victims Jaime Guttenberg and Alex Schachter sued firearm manufacturer American Outdoor Brands Corporation, formerly known as Smith & Wesson, the manufacturer of the rifle used by Cruz, and distributor Sunrise Tactical Supply, the retailer who sold Cruz the rifle, claiming damages due to "the defendant's complicity in the entirely foreseeable, deadly use of the assault-style weapons that they place on the market".

Fifteen survivors sued the county, sheriff, and school officials for failing to protect them, contending that the government's inadequate response to the shooting violated their Fourteenth Amendment right to due process. This lawsuit was dismissed in December 2018, with the judge citing prior case law in ruling that the government did not have a duty to protect the defendants from the actions of the shooter.

In October 2021, the families of the victims of the shooting were awarded a $25 million settlement from Broward County School District, after a civil lawsuit was filed by the families of the 52 victims alleging the school district's negligence was to blame. The money will be paid in three installments and settles 52 of the 53 lawsuits filed against the school district for negligence, although the specified amounts for each family were not released.

In November 2021 it was announced that the families of the victims had reached a $125 to $130 million settlement with the federal government, due to the FBI's inactivity about tips on Cruz's stated desire to commit a school attack and the weapons cache that he had. The tip had been reported to the FBI tip line a month prior to the shooting and detailed Cruz's gun ownership, desire to kill others, erratic behavior, and social media posts, and was not followed up on by investigators.

In June 2024, Cruz settled a civil lawsuit with Anthony Borges granting him rights to Cruz's name so that Cruz cannot grant interviews or make any agreement with film producers or authors without Borges's permission. Borges's lawyer said the objective was to take power and control from Cruz so he cannot inflict further torture on his victims from jail. Cruz also agreed to donate his brain to science.

In August 2024, parents of murdered students Luke Hoyer, Alaina Petty, and Meadow Pollack, each reached $50 million settlements with Cruz while wounded student Maddy Wilford agreed to a $40 million settlement.

== Aftermath ==
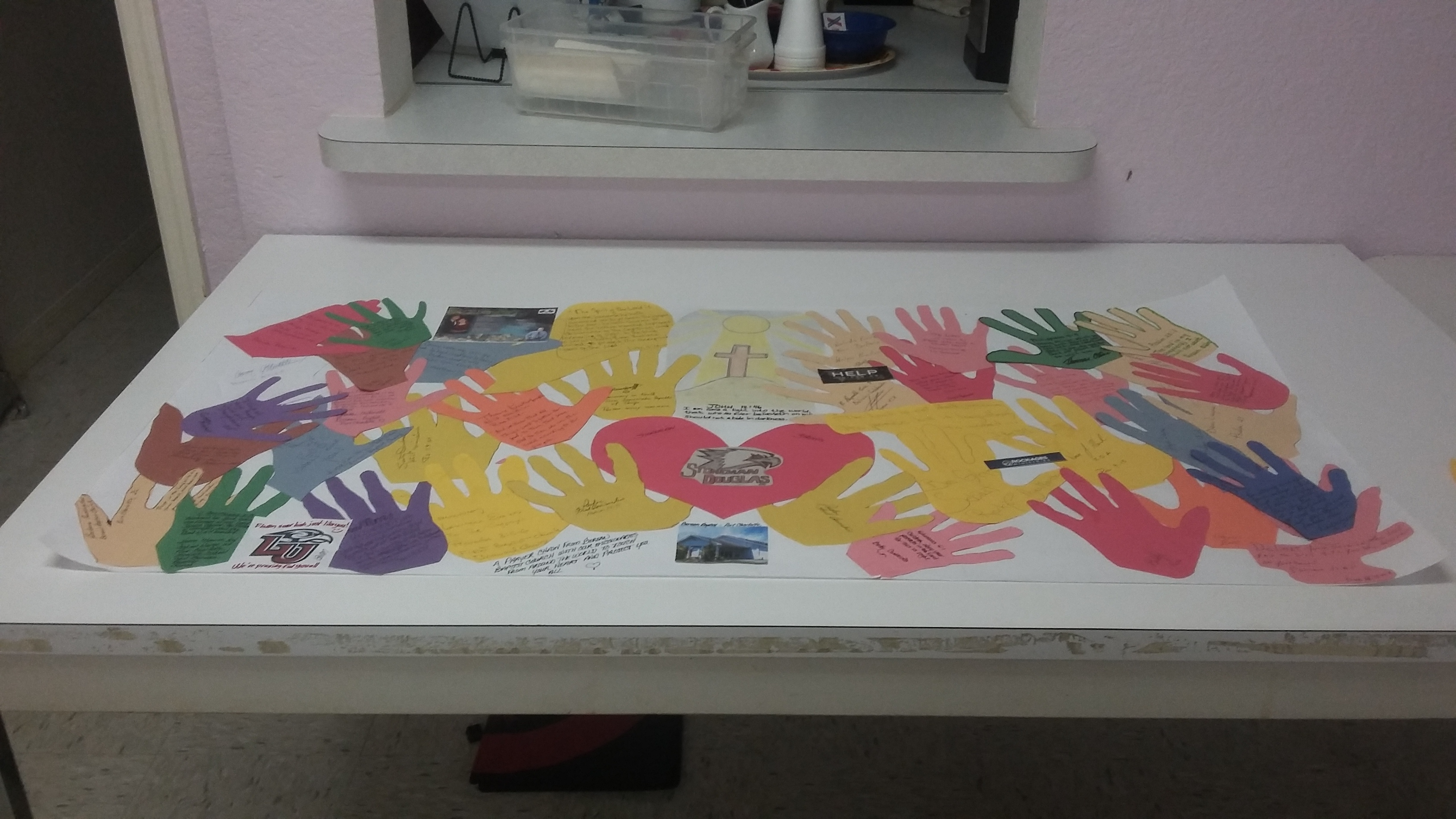
A banner created by a church to offer support for the survivors. Such banners offering love and support were requested by school officials and hung at the campus.

On May 30, 2018, prosecutors released three videos that they claimed Cruz had recorded on his cellphone before the shooting. In the videos, Cruz appears to describe his personal feelings, his enthusiasm and plan for the shooting, his hatred of people, and how it would make him notorious.

=== School response ===
The school district provided grief counseling to students and their families. Florida Attorney General Pam Bondi said that funeral and counseling fees would be paid for by the state.

On February 15, police presence was increased at schools in at least two counties in Florida in response to the shooting.

On February 16, Broward Schools Superintendent Robert Runcie announced that the building where the shooting took place would be demolished. On October 9, 2020, a replacement building was opened. The building where the shooting took place was ordered not to be demolished until the trial of Cruz ended, as it was declared a crime scene. The building began demolition on June 14, 2024.

On February 28, two weeks after the shooting, Stoneman Douglas reopened to students amid a heavy police presence. School principal Ty Thompson emphasized that the first week back would be focused on healing, with classes ending at 11:40 a.m. through March 2. He tweeted "Remember our focus is on emotional readiness and comfort not curriculum: so there is no need for backpacks. Come ready to start the healing process and #RECLAIMTHENEST." Extra counseling and emotional support dogs were provided to students upon their return.

In early April, the school implemented several new safety rules and regulations. The changes included fewer entrances, law enforcement officers at each entrance, identification badges for students and staff, and the requirement that all book bags must be clear plastic. The use of metal detectors was under consideration. Several students criticized the new safety measures as ineffective and intrusive.

On October 8, 2018, almost 8 months after the shooting, survivors of the massacre launched Fortify Florida (shortened to FortifyFL), an anonymous tip reporting app. Students can anonymously report suspicious activity on the site, and can even contact 911 in an emergency.

On November 30, 2018, the Sun Sentinel reported that Broward County Public Schools, which runs Marjory Stoneman Douglas High School, had spent about $185,000 attempting to obscure its role in not preventing the massacre. The district also spent an undisclosed sum on legal opposition to the releasing of records related to the school's treatment of Nikolas Cruz while he was a student, and the school security procedures. A company named CEN received a $60,000 payment to review Cruz's school records and to investigate if the Broward County Public Schools followed the law in its handling of Cruz as a troubled student. The final report omitted various details about the instability of Cruz.

==== Graduation ceremony ====
The school held its graduation ceremony on June 3, 2018, and diplomas were presented to the families of Nicholas Dworet, Joaquin Oliver, Meadow Pollack, and Carmen Schentrup, four seniors who were killed in the attack. Stoneman Douglas principal Ty Thompson began by dedicating the ceremony to "those not with us". Many graduates wore sashes that were emblazoned with #MSDStrong, or decorated their caps with references to the Never Again movement, while some dedicated their caps to their late classmates. Families of the victims also made statements; the mother of Joaquin Oliver accepted his diploma wearing a shirt saying "This should be my son". Talk show host Jimmy Fallon made a surprise appearance and gave a commencement speech to the graduating class, thanking them for their courage and bravery.

==== First anniversary ====
On the first anniversary of the incident, the school opted to establish a voluntary attendance day, organizing a day of community service with early dismissal so that the school was closed at the time of the attack. A police line was created to shelter those students who chose to attend. The large, planned project for the day was to replace the memorial with a permanent memorial garden. A planned moment of silence at 10:17 am ET was held, with support provided from grief counselors and therapy dogs. An interfaith memorial service was planned in a separate location.

=== Officer inactivity ===
SRO Scot Peterson, who was armed, on-site, and in uniform as a Broward Sheriff's Office deputy, responded to the scene but remaining outside of Building 12 during the shooting. Eight days after the attack, he was suspended without pay by Sheriff Israel, and he immediately retired. Sheriff Israel said "Scot Peterson was absolutely on campus for this entire event", and that he should have "gone in, addressed the killer, [and] killed the killer".

In June 2019, following an investigation that included interviews with 184 witnesses, Peterson was arrested and then bonded out for the failing to protect the students during the shooting. He faced 11 charges of neglect of a child, as well as culpable negligence and perjury. Peterson pleaded not guilty and filed a motion to have all charges dropped. However, the motion was denied and jury selection started on May 31, 2023. On June 29, 2023, Peterson was found not guilty on all charges.

A statement released by Peterson's lawyer before he was charged said that Peterson believed the shooting was happening outside the building. According to the lawyer, Peterson claimed he told this to the first Coral Springs police officer who arrived on scene. The statement also pointed to radio transmissions that indicated a gunshot victim near the football field.

The Miami Herald transcribed radio dispatches that Peterson said at 2:23 during the shooting, "Be advised we have possible, could be firecrackers. I think we have shots fired, possible shots fired—1200 building." Seconds later, Peterson radioed: "We're talking about the 1200 building it's going to be the building off Holmberg Road Get the school locked down, gentlemen!" At 2:25, he radioed that "We also heard it's by, inside the 1200." At an unspecified time, Peterson called for police to ensure that "no one comes inside the school." At 2:27, at Building 12, he radioed, "Stay at least 500 feet away at this point." At an unspecified time, Peterson ordered: "Do not approach the 12 or 1300 building, stay at least 500 feet away."

On March 15, the sheriff's office released video footage in compliance with a court order. The video was captured by school surveillance cameras and showed some of Peterson's movements during the shooting.

Unnamed sources told CNN that Coral Springs police arrived at the scene and saw three Broward deputies behind their vehicles with pistols drawn. Broward Sheriff's Office captain Jan Jordan ordered deputies to form a perimeter instead of immediately confronting the shooter; this tactic was contrary to their training regarding active shooters. Based on time stamps of the police logs, the order was given some time after the shooting had stopped. Jordan was widely criticized for her actions, and she resigned, citing personal reasons, nine months after the shooting.

Sheriff Israel said that Coral Springs officers were the first to enter the building, about four minutes after Cruz had surreptitiously left the school. Due to a tape delay in viewing surveillance footage, officers believed that Cruz was still in the building. As of early March 2018, there were three investigations into the timeline of police response.

President Trump criticized the officers who failed to enter the building during the shooting. On February 26, 2018, he said that he would have entered "even if I didn't have a weapon, and I think most of the people in this room would have done that, too".

=== Building ===
The building where the shooting occurred was permanently closed, and it served as evidence at the subsequent murder trial. Demolition of the structure began on June 14, 2024, and concluded by July 8. The site will be covered with sod until plans for the site are finalized. Debby Hixon, a school board member whose husband was among those killed told reporters "We would really like it to be a space where life flourishes." One option named in news reports is a "legacy field" for sports or band practice.

== Reactions ==
=== Political reaction ===
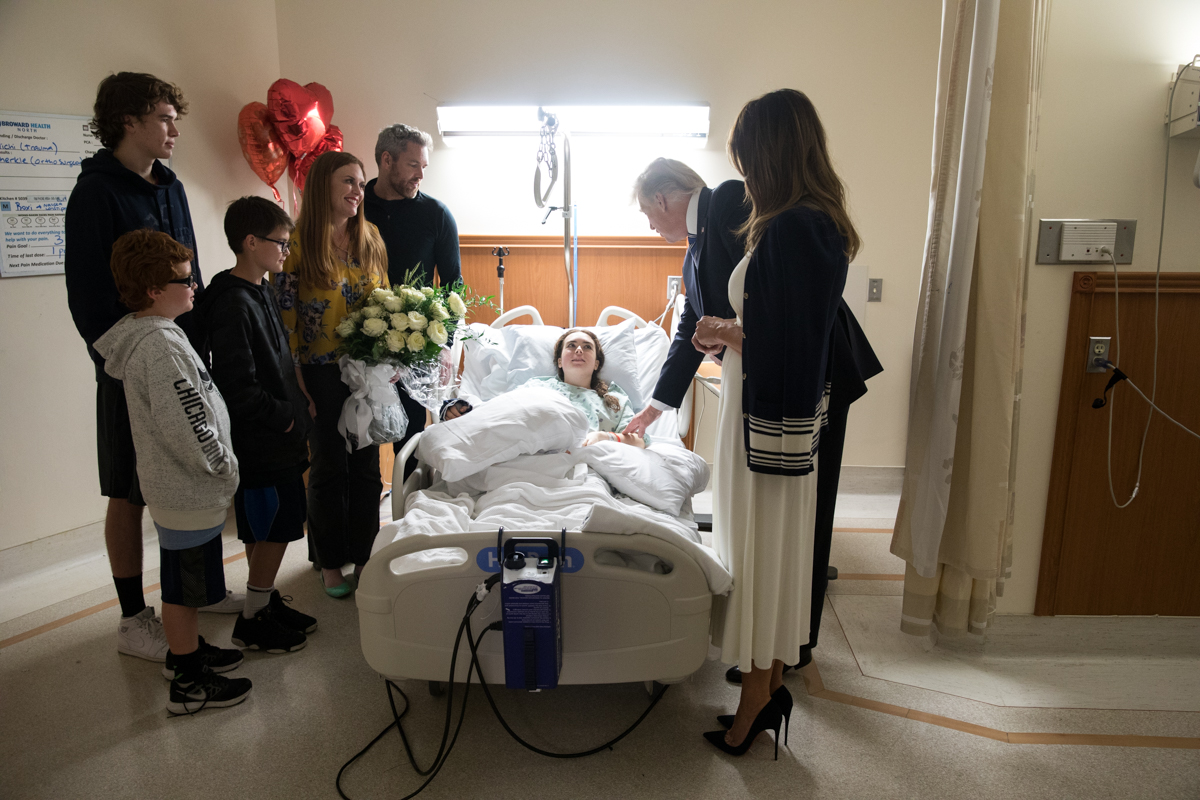
President Donald Trump and First Lady Melania Trump visit victim Madeleine Wilford at Broward Health North Medical Center, two days after the shooting.

President Trump offered his prayers and condolences to the victims' families, writing, "no child, teacher or anyone else should ever feel unsafe in an American school." In a televised address, he mentioned school safety and mental health issues. Florida Governor Rick Scott ordered that flags at state buildings be flown at half-staff. Two days after the shooting, Trump and the first lady Melania visited Broward Health North, a hospital where eight of the shooting victims were admitted. They met with two victims and Trump praised doctors and law enforcement officials for their responses to the attack.

On February 22, Trump met with students and others for a "listening session" at the White House. He suggested arming up to 20% of the teachers to stop "maniacs" from attacking students. The following day, he called a "gun-free" school a "magnet" for criminals and tweeted, "Highly trained, gun adept, teachers/coaches would solve the problem instantly, before police arrive."

BBC News characterized Republican politicians' reactions as focusing on mental health issues while dodging debate on gun control, with the reasoning that it was either "too political or too soon." Republican House Speaker Paul Ryan said that this was the time to "step back and count our blessings" instead of "taking sides and fighting each other politically." Republican Florida Senator Marco Rubio said that "most" proposals on stricter gun laws "would not have prevented" this shooting nor "any of those in recent history" and that lawmakers should take action with "focus on the violence part" alongside guns. Republican Kentucky Governor Matt Bevin declared that the country should re-evaluate "the things being put in the hands of our young people," specifically "quote-unquote video games" that "have desensitized people to the value of human life." Republican Senator Pat Roberts of Kansas said he supported age restrictions on the ownership of AR-15-style rifles, saying "Certainly nobody under 21 should have an AR-15." Republican Senator from Oklahoma James Lankford said on NBC News' Meet the Press he was open to requiring more comprehensive background checks for firearm purchases, saying "The problem is not owning an AR-15, it's the person who owns it." Republican governor of Ohio John Kasich called for restrictions on the sales of AR-15-style rifles, saying on CNN "if all of a sudden, you couldn't buy an AR-15, what would you lose? Would you feel as though your Second Amendment rights would be eroded because you couldn't buy a God-darn AR-15?" Republican Representative Brian Mast from Florida, a former resident of Parkland and an Army veteran, wrote in an op-ed in The New York Times that he supported a ban on the sale of civilian versions of military rifles, writing:

Most nights in Afghanistan, I wielded an M4 carbine. My rifle was very similar to the AR-15-style semiautomatic weapon used to kill students, teachers and a coach I knew at Marjory Stoneman Douglas High School in Parkland, Fla., where I once lived...I cannot support the primary weapon I used to defend our people being used to kill children I swore to defend. The AR-15 is an excellent platform for recreational shooters to learn to be outstanding marksmen. Unfortunately, it is also an excellent platform for those who wish to kill the innocent.

Democratic Senator from Florida Bill Nelson said "I have hunted all my life. But an AR-15 is not for hunting. It's for killing."

Al Hoffman Jr., a Republican donor in Florida, pledged that he would no longer fund legislative groups or candidates who were not actively working to ban sales of military-style weapons to civilians. He said, "For how many years now have we been doing this—having these experiences of terrorism, mass killings—and how many years has it been that nothing's been done?"

Sheriff Israel called on lawmakers to amend the Baker Act to allow police to detain and hospitalize people who make disturbing posts—not just clear threats—on social media. "I'm talking about being around bombs, possibly talking about 'I want to be a serial killer,' talking about taking people's lives," he said. "Just taking a picture with a gun or a knife or a weapon—that in and of itself is clearly not even remotely something that we're concerned about."

=== Gun control debate ===
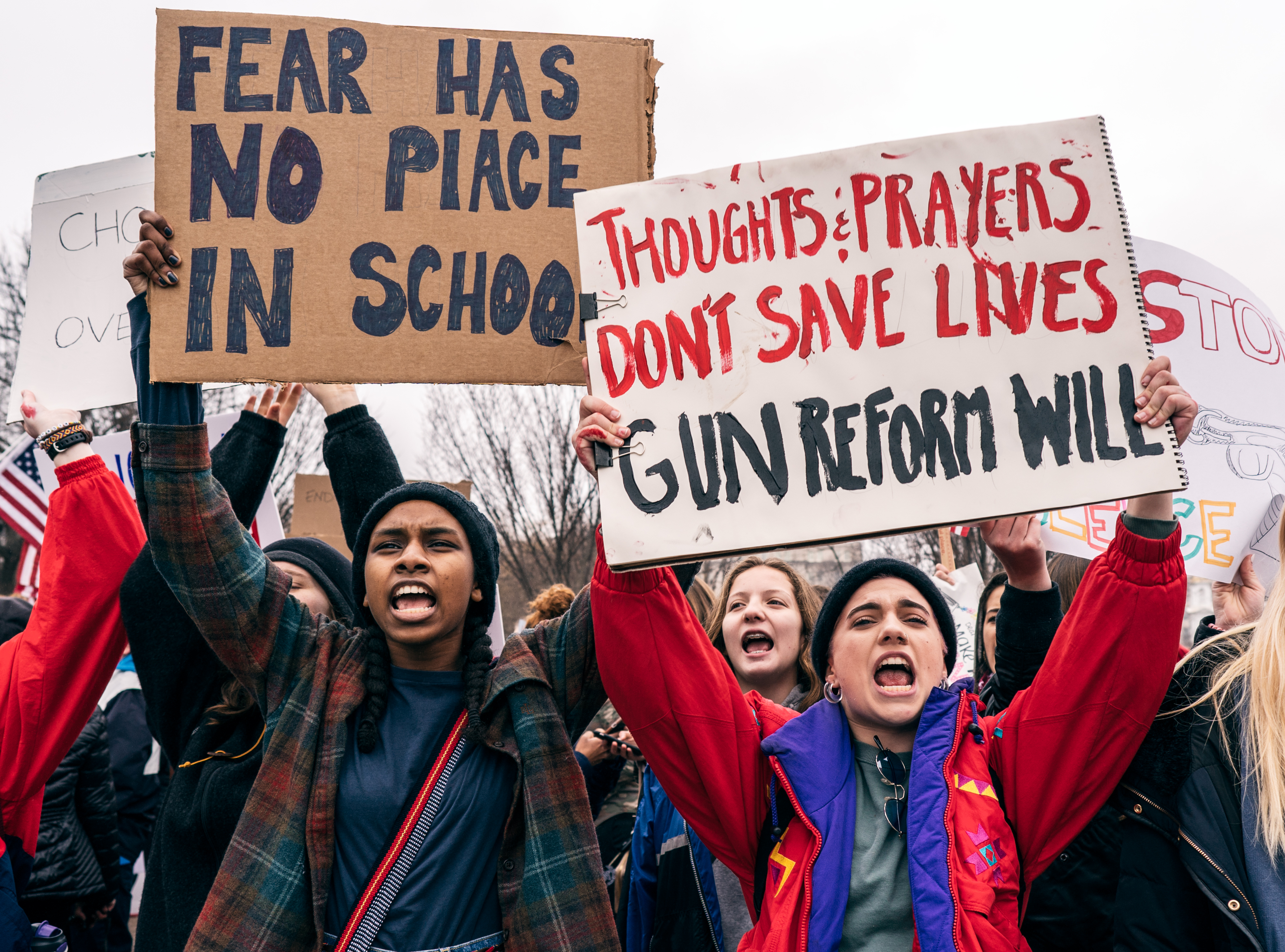
Students protest gun violence outside the White House in Washington, D.C., February 18, 2018

Many student survivors criticized the response from politicians and asked them not to offer condolences but to take action to prevent more students from being killed in school shootings. These students have demanded stricter gun control measures. Survivor X González was noted for their speech that rebuked thoughts and prayers from politicians. They later helped lead a protest movement against gun violence in the United States. Broward County Schools Superintendent Robert Runcie said, "now is the time to have a real conversation about gun control legislation." Lori Alhadeff, whose daughter was killed in the shooting, implored Trump to do something to improve school safety.

In the aftermath of the shooting, some of the student survivors organized Never Again MSD. The group was created on social media with the hashtag #NeverAgain, activism inspired in part by the ground broken by the #MeToo movement and the 2018 Women's March. The group demanded legislative action to prevent similar shootings and has condemned lawmakers who received political contributions from the National Rifle Association. The group held a rally on February 17 in Fort Lauderdale that was attended by hundreds of supporters.

Since the shooting, several more rallies have been planned to take place with the focus on legislative action. The Women's March Network organized a 17-minute school walkout that took place on March 14. A series of demonstrations called "March for Our Lives" on March 24 included a march in Washington, D.C. On April 20, the anniversary of the Columbine High School massacre, all-day walkouts were planned for teacher groups by educators Diane Ravitch and David Berliner, as well as student groups.

On February 20, dozens of Stoneman Douglas High School students went to the state Capitol in Tallahassee and watched as the Florida House of Representatives rejected a bill that would have banned some guns characterized as assault weapons. Students strongly criticized the vote. The bill's sponsor, Carlos Guillermo Smith, highlighted the legislature's failure to respond to the use of an assault weapon in the mass shooting at Stoneman Douglas High School, while passing a bill to declare that pornography is a public health risk.

In mid-March, Lori Alhadeff announced her own nonprofit organization, Make Schools Safe, which will be mostly focusing on school campus security.

In May 2018, Cameron Kasky's father registered a super PAC, Families vs Assault Rifles PAC (FAMSVARPAC), with intentions of going "up against NRA candidates in every meaningful race in the country."

==== State law ====
In March 2018, the Florida Legislature passed a bill titled the Marjory Stoneman Douglas High School Public Safety Act. It raised the minimum age for buying rifles to 21, established waiting periods and background checks, provided a program for the arming of some school employees and hiring of school police, banned bump stocks, and barred some potentially violent or mentally unhealthy people arrested under certain laws from possessing guns. In all, it allocated around $400 million. Rick Scott signed the bill into law on March 9.

On the day the Parkland bill was signed into law, the NRA sued, challenging the ban on gun sales to people ages 18 to 21. The US District Court for the Northern District of Florida upheld the constitutionality of the law and dismissed the NRA's suit in June 2021.

The NRA then filed its appeal to the Eleventh Circuit, where a three-judge panel initially upheld the law's constitutionality on March 9, 2023. However, on the same day, an appellate judge withheld the mandate of the opinion, and on July 14, 2023, the Eleventh Circuit granted the NRA's petition to rehear it en banc.

On March 26, 2025, the Florida House of Representatives passed a bill titled the Minimum Age for Firearm Purchase or Transfer Act, which was sponsored by Michelle Salzman and endorsed by governor Ron DeSantis, to lower the minimum age for purchasing long guns back to 18. Salzman said the purpose of the bill was "about the right to defend yourself, the right to keep and bear arms, [and] the right to a well-armed militia" and "not about the tragedy". On April 21, Senate Rules Chairwoman Kathleen Passidomo said that her committee would not take a vote on the House bill. Passidomo's statement came five days after a mass shooting at Florida State University, but she also said that the decision had been made before the attack.

==== Federal law ====
On February 20, 2018, Trump directed the Department of Justice to issue regulations to ban bump stocks.

On March 23, the STOP School Violence Act was signed into law as part of the Consolidated Appropriations Act, 2018, which increases funding for metal detectors, security training, and similar safety measures. Lawmakers made it clear it was in response to the shooting and the public outcry. Some students from the Stoneman Douglas High School, who were active in calling for stricter gun control (not just safety measures), said the measure was passed because lawmakers "pass something very easy and simple that everyone can get behind. But that's because it doesn't do anything."

==== Boycott of NRA and responses from businesses ====
Following the shooting, people boycotted gun rights advocacy groups including the National Rifle Association of America (NRA) and its business affiliates. Many companies responded to the shooting by changing some of their business dealings and practices.

Calls for companies to sever their ties to the NRA were heeded when several companies terminated their business relationships with the NRA.

Major gun sellers such as Dick's, Walmart, and Fred Meyer voluntarily raised the age requirement on gun purchases from 18 to 21. The NRA challenged the new age requirement in court. Other businesses like Bank of America and Citibank also ended some of their dealings with gun manufacturers and vendors.

=== Victims' funds ===
In the aftermath of the shooting, more than $7.5 million was raised for the victims as of April 2018. Two other funds, Florida's Crime Victims Compensation Fund, which pays for medical and funeral expenses, and the National Compassion Fund, which pays for pain and suffering, are also available to help the victims of the Parkland shooting.

In addition, victim Scott Beigel's family started a memorial fund in his name with the goal of funding summer camp tuition for students traumatized by school shootings, a passion of Beigel. The memorial fund is majorly involved with events, including a 5K run, and partnered with Oneida-based Camp Fiver, which also gave the fund an honorary award.

=== Conspiracy theories, disinformation, and harassment ===
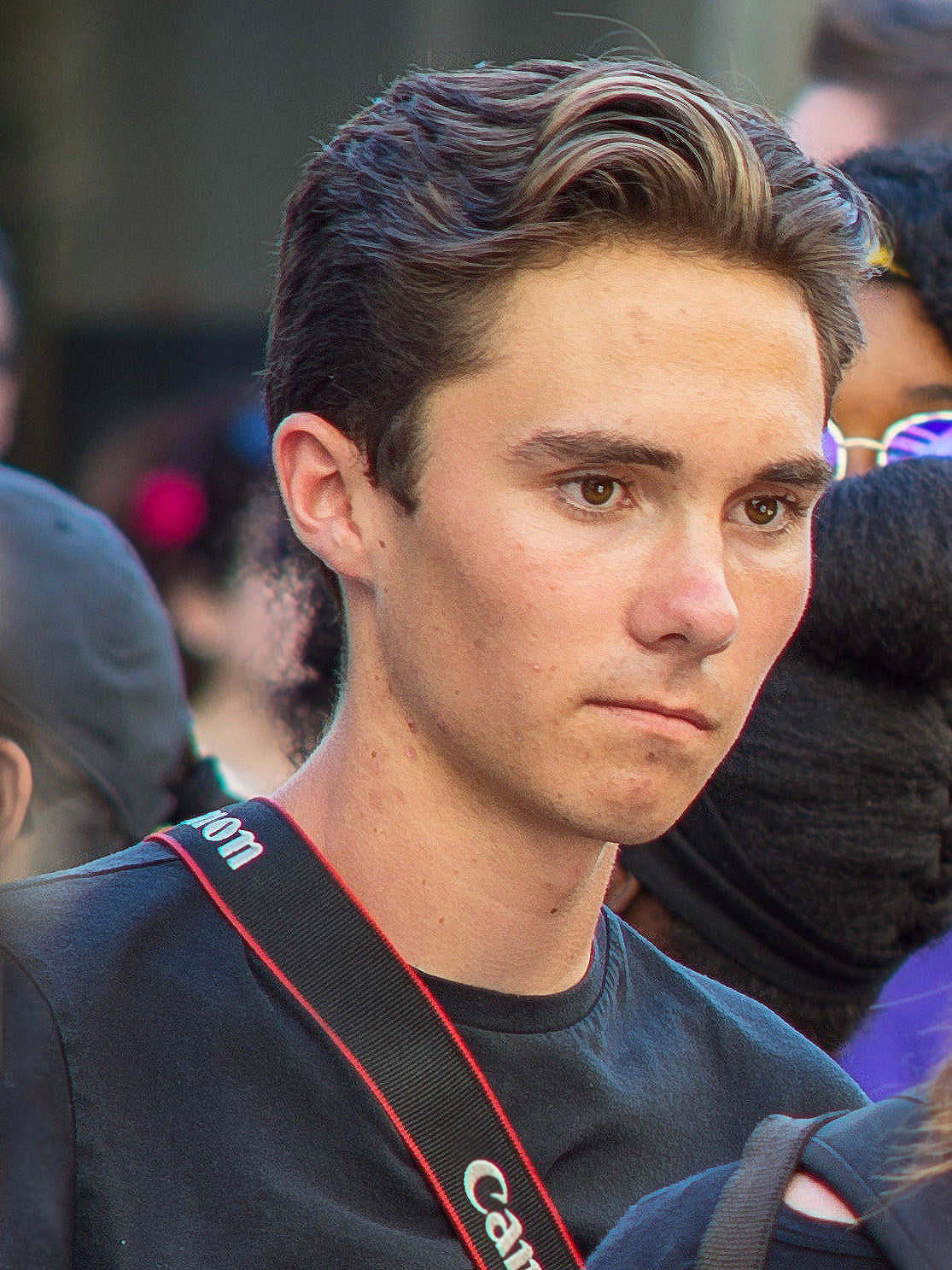
Student David Hogg was subjected to widespread allegations of being a crisis actor.

Anti-gun control conspiracy theories circulated in the wake of the shooting. The speculation included false claims that the shooting did not happen or was staged by "crisis actors". One such claim was made by Benjamin A. Kelly, a district secretary for Republican State Representative Shawn Harrison, who sent an email to the Tampa Bay Times falsely stating that the children in the picture were not students at the school. As a result of the backlash, Kelly was fired hours later. Former Republican congressman and CNN contributor Jack Kingston suggested student demonstrators were paid by billionaire George Soros or were supported by "members of Antifa". A video with a description espousing a conspiracy theory that student David Hogg was a "crisis actor" reached the top of YouTube's trending page before it was removed by the company. As the shooting took place, a teacher directed Hogg and several other students to hide in a closet. Hogg, who worked on the school's TV station, then filmed student reactions to the shooting in an effort to document the event.

The Alliance for Securing Democracy alleged that Russia-linked accounts on Twitter and other platforms used the shooting's aftermath to inflame tensions and divide Americans by posting loaded comments that oppose gun control. Other Russia-linked accounts labeled the shooting a false flag operation that the US government would exploit to seize guns from citizens. Hundreds of Russian bots were also suspected of coming to the defense of Laura Ingraham on Twitter following the boycott of her show, The Ingraham Angle, that resulted from her public ridicule of Hogg. The conspiracy theories about survivors like Hogg and González were named PolitiFact's 2018 Lie of the Year.

Some of the survivors of the shooting and their relatives were targeted by online harassment that included death threats. Cameron Kasky wrote on Twitter that he was quitting Facebook for the time being, because the death threats from "NRA cultists" were slightly more graphic on a service without a character limit.

In March 2019, future US Representative Marjorie Taylor Greene (R-GA) was filmed heckling and harassing survivor David Hogg as he was walking toward the United States Capitol.

== See also ==
- Assault weapons legislation in the United States
- Extreme Risk Protection Order
- Federal Assault Weapons Ban
- Bipartisan Safer Communities Act
- Gun politics in the United States
- List of attacks related to secondary schools
- List of school shootings in the United States by death toll
- List of disasters in the United States by death toll
- List of rampage killers (school massacres)
- List of school shootings in the United States (2000–present)
- 2018 Santa Fe High School shooting – similar school shooting in Texas in May 2018
- Northern Illinois University shooting – school shooting that occurred on Valentine's Day, exactly 10 years earlier
