= Ralph Pagano =

American chef and television personality (born 1968)

- Born: September 23, 1968 (age 58); Livingston, New Jersey
- Occupations: Chef, TV personality
- Known for: Runner-up of first season of Hell's Kitchen

Ralph Pagano (born September 23, 1968) is an American chef, restaurateur and television personality. He appeared on the first season of Hell's Kitchen and hosted the series Pressure Cook on MOJO HD (later on Travel Channel). He also challenged chef Bobby Flay on the American version of Iron Chef; Pagano lost the challenge to Flay.

Pagano is the chef of Naked Taco in Miami Beach, Florida. In April 2015, he opened Naked Lunch at the University of Miami as well as Naked Crab inside Fort Lauderdale’s B Ocean Resort. In August 2015, he announced plans to open two new restaurants under his "Naked" brand; these would turn out to be new Naked Taco outposts in Resorts World Bimini, Bahamas, and in The Promenade at Coconut Creek, Florida. In 2020, he announced yet another Naked Taco outlet set to open in Boca Raton. Pagano also opened a restaurant named Naked Tiki.

One of Pagano's employees is Hell's Kitchen season 10 competitor Royce Wagner, who finished in 10th place.

In October 2023, Pagano was arrested for aggravated assault with a deadly weapon after a verbal confrontation with another driver that allegedly involved him inserting a baseball bat through the driver's passenger window, hitting the driver's child in the process.
