= Margate, Florida =

City in Florida, United States

- City
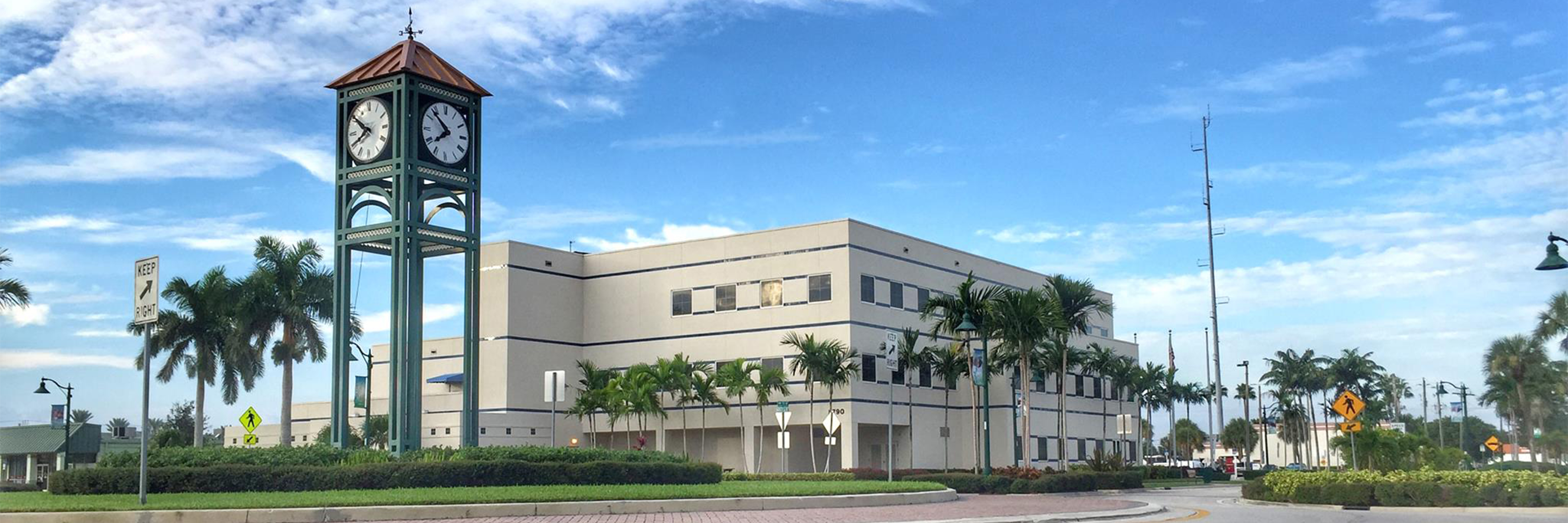
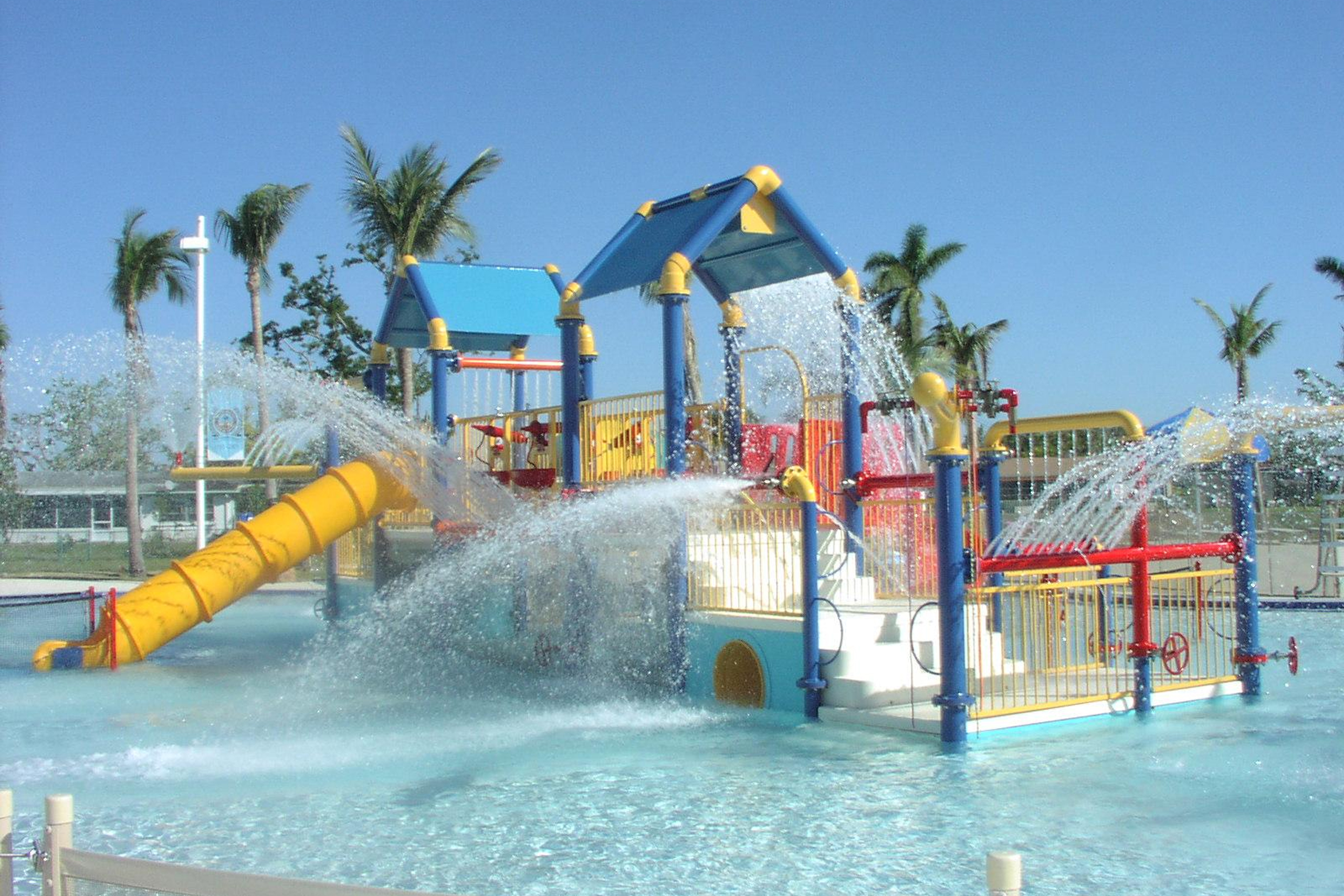
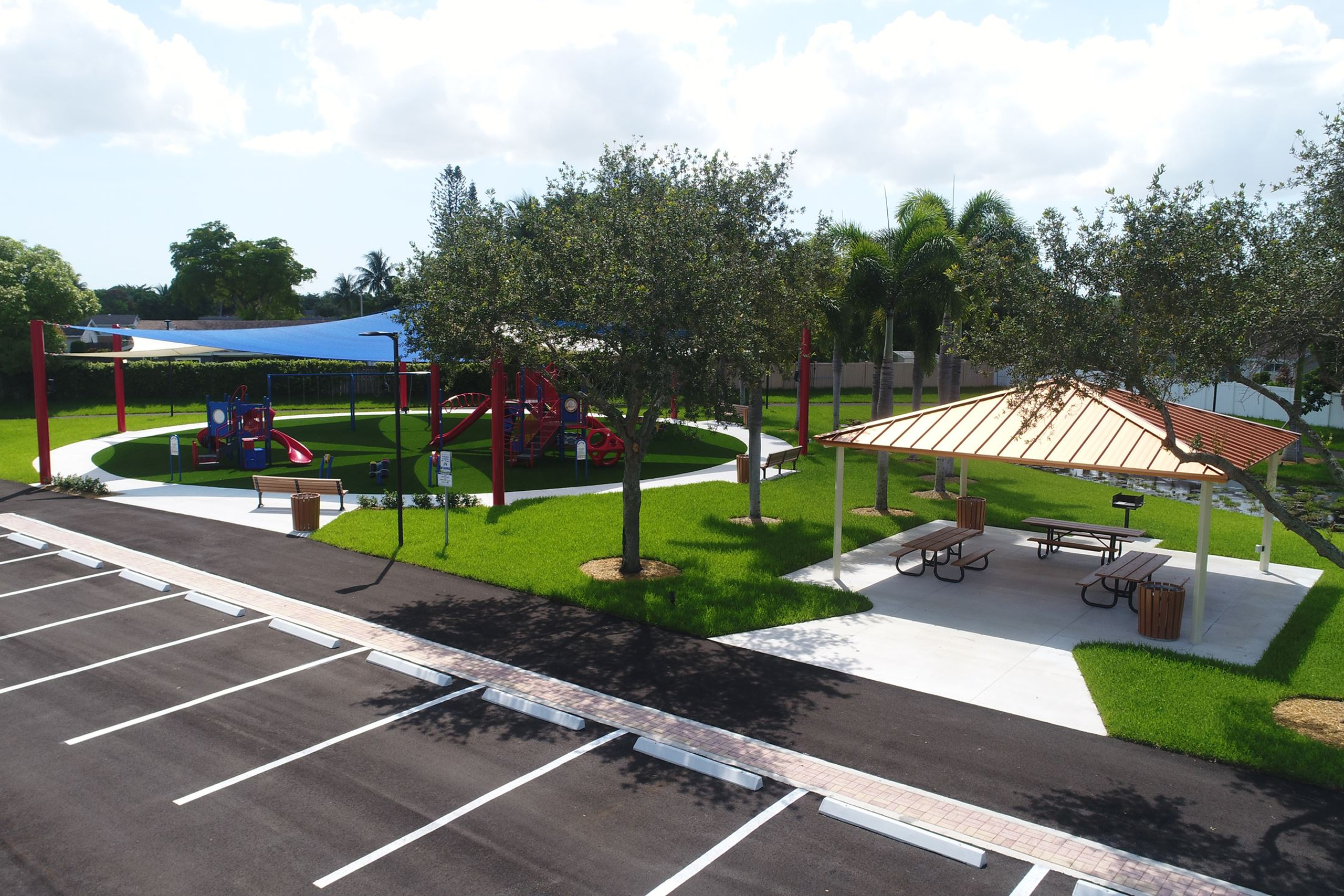
- City Hall of Margate and Clock Tower Calypso Cove Serino Park

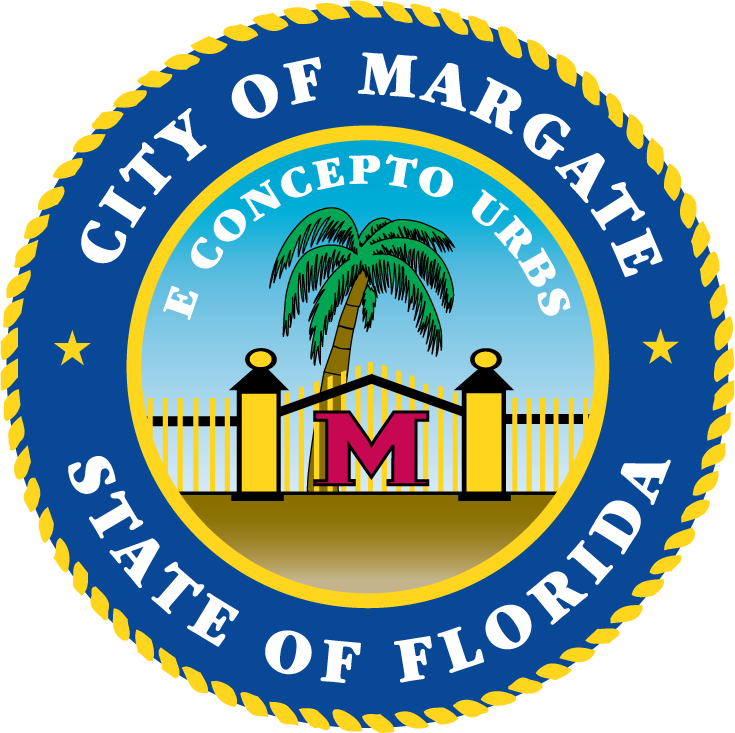
- Seal
- Motto(s): "E Concepto Urbs", "Together We Make It Great"
- Location of Margate, Broward County, Florida
- Coordinates: 26°15′22″N 80°12′45″W
- Country: United States
- State: Florida
- County: Broward
- Incorporated (town): May 30, 1955
- Incorporated (city): June 22, 1961

Government
  - Type: Commission-Manager

Area
  - City: 9.05 sq mi (23.43 km^{2})
  - Land: 8.76 sq mi (22.69 km^{2})
  - Water: 0.29 sq mi (0.74 km^{2}) 1.89%
- Elevation: 13 ft (4.0 m)

Population (2020)
  - City: 58,712
  - Density: 6,702.2/sq mi (2,587.75/km^{2})
  - Metro: 6,166,488
- Time zone: UTC-5 (Eastern (EST))
  - Summer (DST): UTC-4 (EDT)
- ZIP code: 33063, 33065, 33068, 33073, 33093
- Area codes: 954, 754
- FIPS code: 12-43125
- GNIS feature ID: 2405016
- Website: margatefl.com

Margate is a city in Broward County, Florida, United States. The city of Margate is part of the Miami metropolitan area. As of the 2020 census, the city had a population of 58,712.

== History ==
Margate was founded in the 1950s, when much of it was still either part of the Everglades or farmland. It became a town in 1955, when land development became prominent due to an influx of people moving to Margate. In 1961, it was officially incorporated as a city. The name Margate is a portmanteau of the first three letters of the founder's last name, Jack Marqusee, and the first four letters of gateway, since it was considered a "gateway" to western Broward County. The city has a waterpark called Calypso Cove and a golf course, Oriole Golf and Tennis Club.

== Geography ==
Margate is located seven and one-half miles from the Atlantic Ocean.

According to the United States Census Bureau, the city has a total area of 8.98 square miles (23 km^{2}), of which 8.81 square miles (23 km^{2}) is land and 0.17 square miles (0 km^{2}) is water (1.89%).

== Climate ==
Margate has a tropical climate, similar to the climate found in much of the Caribbean. It is part of the only region in the 48 contiguous states that falls under that category. More specifically, it generally has a tropical rainforest climate (Köppen climate classification: Af), bordering a tropical monsoon climate (Köppen climate classification: Am).

== Demographics ==
Historical population
Census	Pop.	Note	%±
1960	2,646		—
1970	8,867		235.1%
1980	35,900		304.9%
1990	42,985		19.7%
2000	53,909		25.4%
2010	53,284		−1.2%
2020	58,712		10.2%
U.S. Decennial Census

=== Racial and ethnic composition ===
Margate racial composition (Hispanics excluded from racial categories) (NH = Non-Hispanic)
Race	Pop 2010	Pop 2020	% 2010	% 2020
White (NH)	24,521	18,165	46.02%	30.94%
Black or African American (NH)	13,222	18,484	24.81%	31.48%
Native American or Alaska Native (NH)	96	87	0.18%	0.15%
Asian (NH)	2,107	2,502	3.95%	4.26%
Pacific Islander or Native Hawaiian (NH)	29	20	0.05%	0.03%
Some other race (NH)	369	889	0.69%	1.51%
Two or more races/Multiracial (NH)	1,094	2,648	2.05%	4.51%
Hispanic or Latino (any race)	11,846	15,917	22.23%	27.11%
Total	53,284	58,712		

=== 2020 census ===
As of the 2020 census, Margate had a population of 58,712. The median age was 44.3 years. 18.7% of residents were under the age of 18 and 21.5% of residents were 65 years of age or older. For every 100 females there were 89.0 males, and for every 100 females age 18 and over there were 85.5 males age 18 and over.

100.0% of residents lived in urban areas, while 0.0% lived in rural areas.

There were 23,163 households in Margate, of which 27.4% had children under the age of 18 living in them. Of all households, 42.2% were married-couple households, 17.8% were households with a male householder and no spouse or partner present, and 33.7% were households with a female householder and no spouse or partner present. About 28.6% of all households were made up of individuals and 15.4% had someone living alone who was 65 years of age or older.

There were 25,985 housing units, of which 10.9% were vacant. The homeowner vacancy rate was 1.8% and the rental vacancy rate was 8.0%.

Racial composition as of the 2020 census
Race	Number	Percent
White	21,482	36.6%
Black or African American	18,908	32.2%
American Indian and Alaska Native	207	0.4%
Asian	2,564	4.4%
Native Hawaiian and Other Pacific Islander	25	0.0%
Some other race	5,524	9.4%
Two or more races	10,002	17.0%
Hispanic or Latino (of any race)	15,917	27.1%

=== 2010 census ===
As of the 2010 United States census, there were 53,284 people, 21,895 households, and 13,230 families residing in the city.

=== 2000 census ===
In 2000, there were 22,714 households, out of which 25.8% had children under the age of 18 living with them, 49.1% were married couples living together, 10.2% had a female householder with no husband present, and 36.9% were non-families. 30.8% of all households were made up of individuals, and 18.0% had someone living alone who was 65 years of age or older. The average household size was 2.36 and the average family size was 2.95.

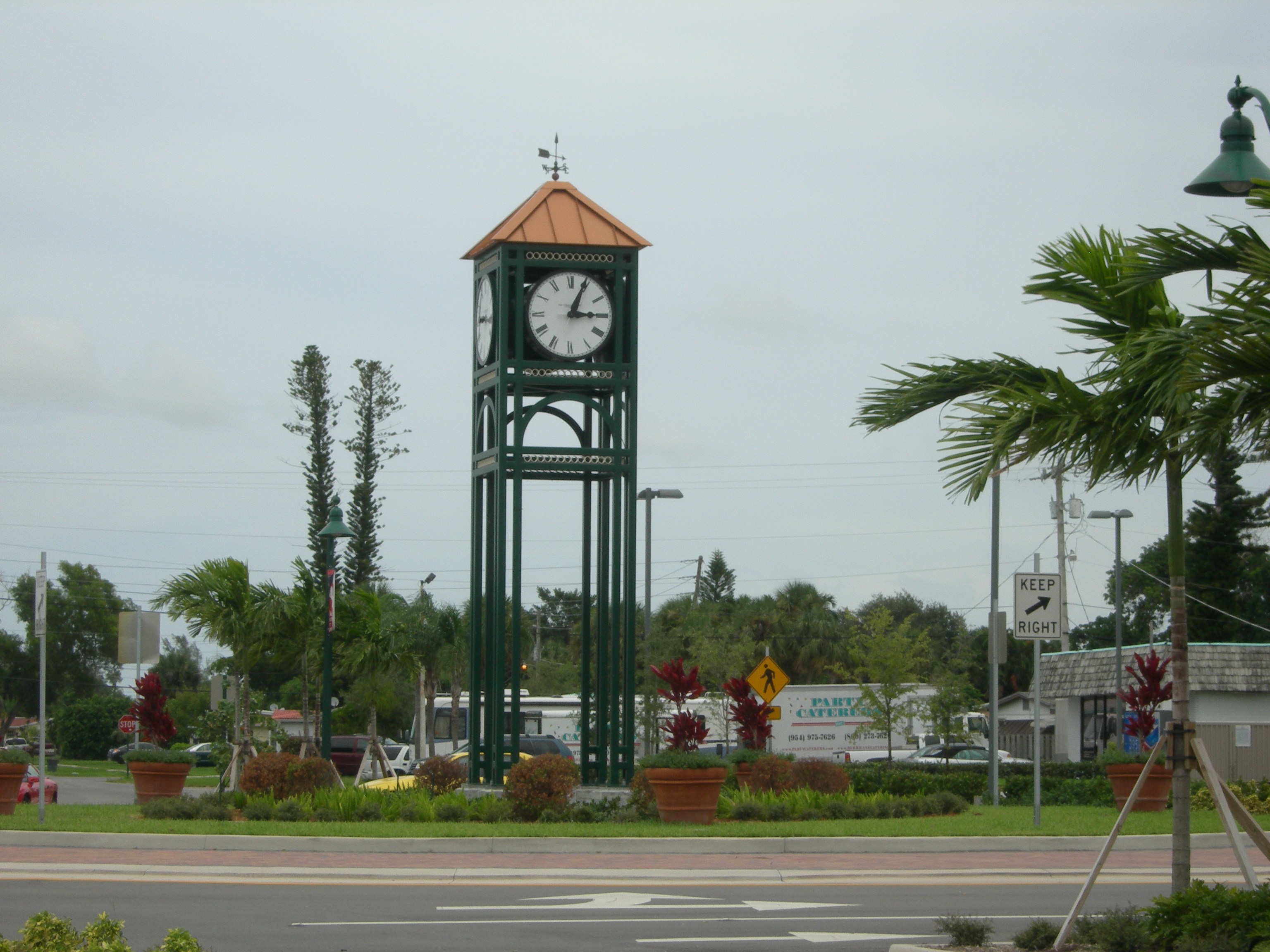
Clock tower near city hall.

In 2000, the city the population was spread out, with 20.9% under the age of 18, 6.5% from 18 to 24, 29.2% from 25 to 44, 21.7% from 45 to 64, and 21.7% who were 65 years of age or older. The median age was 40 years. For every 100 females, there were 89.5 males. For every 100 females age 18 and over, there were 85.6 males.

In 2000, the median income for a household in the city was $38,722, and the median income for a family was $48,254. Males had a median income of $35,630 versus $26,624 for females. The per capita income for the city was $20,308. About 5.5% of families and 8.4% of the population were below the poverty line, including 10.7% of those under age 18 and 10.4% of those age 65 or over.

As of 2000, 75.9% of residents speak English as their first language, 13.8% speak Spanish, 2.85% French Creole, 1.69% French, and 1.20% Italian.

As of 2000, Margate was the sixty-sixth most Colombian-populated area in the US at 2.22% of residents. It was also the forty-ninth most Haitian-populated area (tied with Pleasantville, New Jersey) at 3.2% and forty-third most Jamaican-populated area (tied with Opa-locka) at 3% of the population.

== Education ==
Margate is served by public schools operated by Broward County Public Schools.

Elementary schools

- Atlantic West Elementary (STEAM Magnet School) – Central, west, and southwest Margate
- Liberty Elementary (STEM Magnet School) – Portions east of US 441
- Margate Elementary – Central, north, and northwest Margate
- Morrow Elementary (in North Lauderdale) – Southwest Margate

Middle school

- Margate Middle School (STEM Magnet School) – Serves almost all of the city
- Silver Lakes Middle School (in North Lauderdale) – serves a small section of the city
- Rise Academy – Small School located on the border of Margate.

High schools

- Coconut Creek High School (in neighboring Coconut Creek)
- Coral Springs High School (in neighboring Coral Springs)
- Monarch High School (in Coconut Creek)

It is also in proximity to, and in the service area of, the all-magnet school Atlantic Technical High School (in neighboring Coconut Creek).

Charter Schools

- Broward Math and Science Schools (K–8)
- RISE Academy (K–8)
- West Broward Academy (K–8)

Charter High Schools

- Ascend Academy (9–12)
- SunEd High School of North Broward (9–12)

Private schools

- Abundant Life Christian Academy
- Faith Baptist Academy
- Hebrew Academy Community School
- Winfield Christian Academy

== Notable people ==
- David Adams (b. 1987) – Major League Baseball (MLB) player
- Shanyder Borgelin (b. 2001) – soccer player
- Bobby Cannavale (b. 1970) – actor
- Barry Cantrell (b. 1976) – National Football League (NFL) player
- Sarah Chadwick (b. 2001) – anti-gun violence activist and survivor of the Parkland high school shooting
- Sean Chen (b. 1988) – pianist
- Nikolas Cruz (b. 1998) – perpetrator of the Parkland high school shooting
- Eric Eichmann (b. 1965) – professional soccer player and United States international
- Jonathan Freeny (b. 1989) – NFL player
- Arin Hanson (b. 1987) – YouTuber, actor, rapper, and animator
- Waheed Yar Khan (b. 1942) – cricket player
- Brandon Knight (b. 1991) – National Basketball Association player
- Phillip Lamarre (b. 1987) – professional soccer player
- Al Lamberti (b. 1954) – sheriff of Broward County
- Joe Lo Truglio (b. 1970) – actor and comedian
- Matt Luzunaris (b. 1989) – professional soccer player
- Michael Palardy (b. 1992) – NFL player
- Jim Ray (1944–2005) – MLB player
- Josh Smith (b. 1987) – MLB player
- Kaye Stevens (1932–2011) – singer and actress
