= Coconut Creek, Florida =

- City
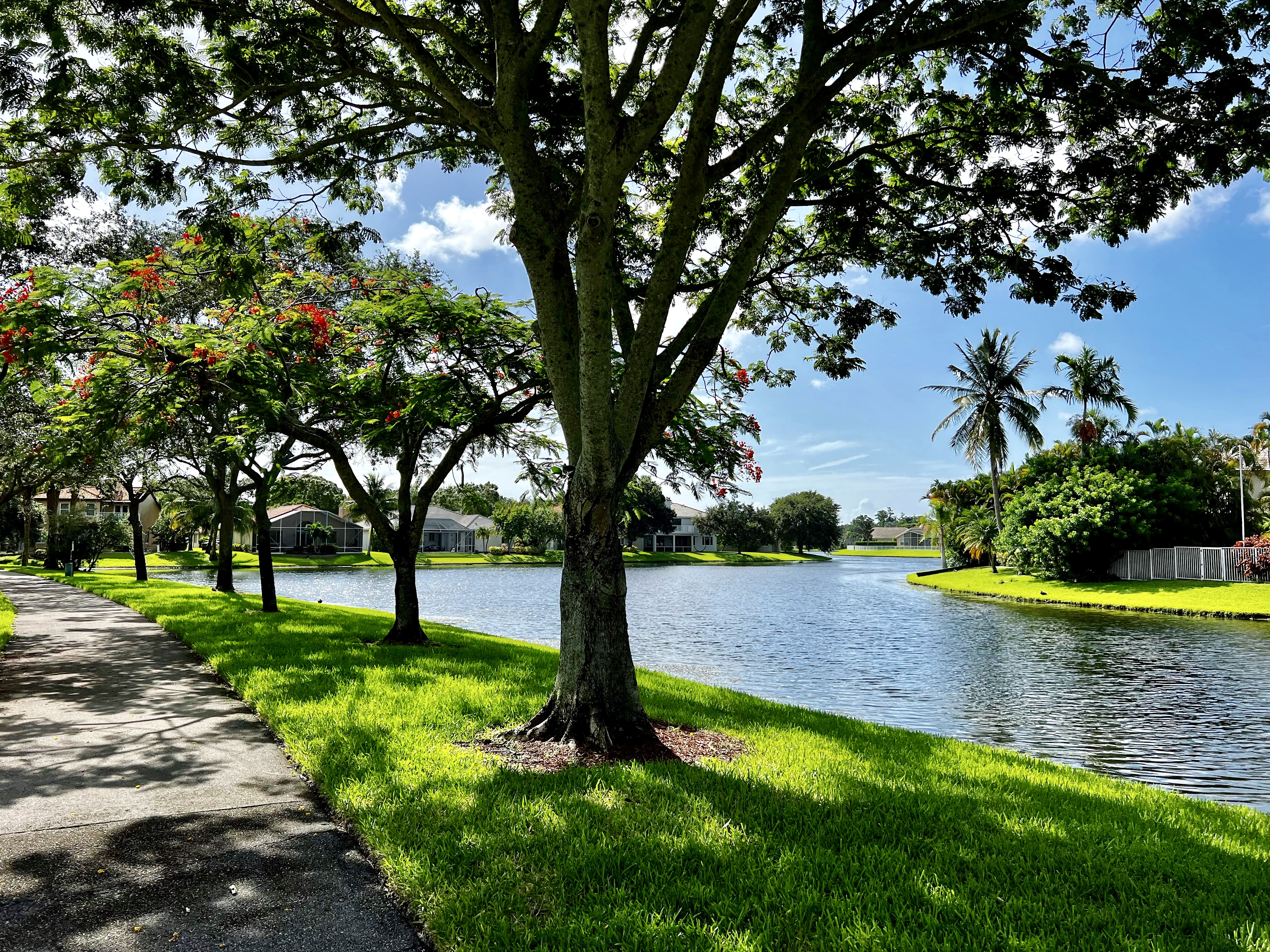
- A lakefront neighborhood in Coconut Creek

- Flag Seal Logo
- Nickname: "Butterfly Capital of the World"
- Location in Broward County and the State of Florida
- Coordinates: 26°15′25″N 80°11′02″W
- Country: United States
- State: Florida
- County: Broward
- Incorporated: February 20, 1967; 59 years ago

Government
  - Type: Commission-Manager

Area
  - City: 12.00 sq mi (31.07 km^{2})
  - Land: 11.17 sq mi (28.94 km^{2})
  - Water: 0.82 sq mi (2.12 km^{2})
- Elevation: 10 ft (3.0 m)

Population (2020)
  - City: 57,833
  - Density: 5,174.9/sq mi (1,998.03/km^{2})
  - Metro: 6,166,488
- Time zone: UTC-5 (EST)
  - Summer (DST): UTC-4 (EDT)
- ZIP codes: 33063, 33066, 33073, 33093, 33097
- Area codes: 754, 954
- FIPS code: 12-13275
- GNIS feature ID: 2404091
- Website: www.coconutcreek.gov

Coconut Creek is a city in Broward County, Florida, United States. Situated 37 miles (60 km) north of Miami, it had an estimated population of 57,348 in 2022. It is part of South Florida's Miami metropolitan area. The city seceded from Pompano Beach in the 1960s. It is nicknamed "Butterfly Capital of the World" because it is home to Butterfly World, the world's largest butterfly aviary, with over 80 species and 20,000 individual butterflies.

== Characteristics ==
Coconut Creek has an area of 12 square miles (31 km^{2}), with approximately 57,000 residents and 1,400 businesses. Housing is primarily single-family homes, condominiums, and townhouses within professionally landscaped communities.

The city took its name from the coconut trees, that were planted in the area by early developers. Robert E. Bateman, one of the developers, named Coconut Creek after combining the names of Miami-Dade County's village of Indian Creek and the Miami neighborhood of Coconut Grove.

The city is a planned community with an environmental consciousness touting an abundance of trees, waterways, landscaped roads, parks, and butterfly gardens throughout the neighborhoods. This is due to the city's progressive planning approach to creating a unique life-style for residents and businesses. Coconut Creek is the first in the state of Florida and eleventh in the country to be certified as a "Community Wildlife Habitat".

Playful City USA, a national program advocating for local policies that increase play opportunities for children and is a key platform in combating the play deficit, has named Coconut Creek a 2012 Playful City USA. KaBOOM! selected Coconut Creek for its outstanding dedication to play.

Coconut Creek is adjacent to the Monarch Hill Renewable Energy Park, colloquially known as "Mount Trashmore", which has long emitted foul odors into the air of the city. In September 2010, after threatening to sue over the landfill's odors, Coconut Creek reached an agreement with Waste Management, Inc., the operator of the landfill, that prohibits food and other decaying materials from going into Mount Trashmore after October 2, 2013.

== Geography ==
The city is in northern Broward County. It is bounded by unincorporated Palm Beach County on the north, by the cities of Parkland, Coral Springs and Margate on its west, by Deerfield Beach on its east, and by Pompano Beach on its east and southeast.

According to the United States Census Bureau, Coconut Creek has a total area of 12.0 square miles (31.1 km^{2}), of which 11.9 square miles (30.7 km^{2}) is land and 0.15 square miles (0.4 km^{2}) is water (1.21%).

=== Climate ===
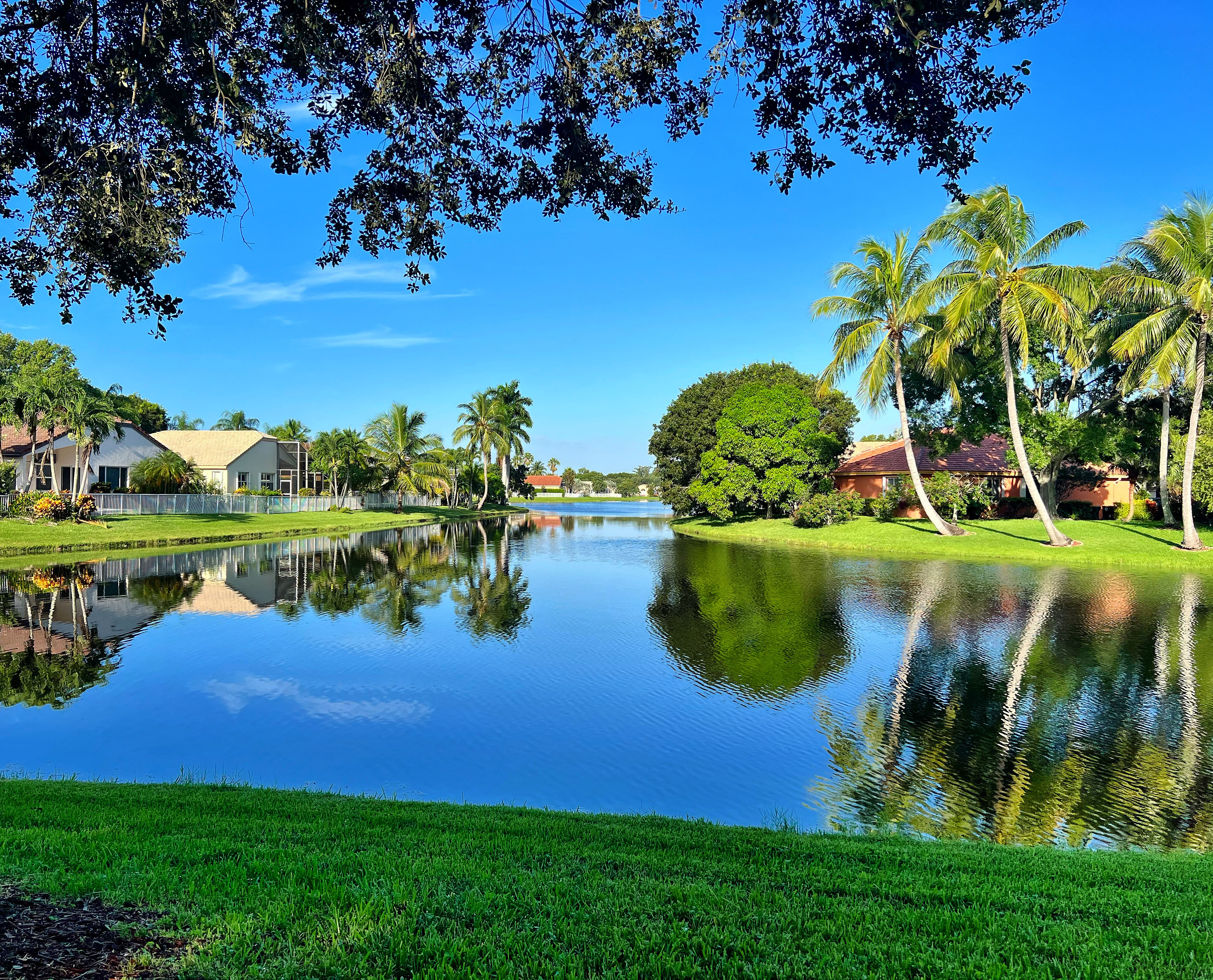
A neighborhood with coconut palms, displaying the tropical climate.

According to the Köppen climate classification, Coconut Creek has a tropical rainforest climate (Af). The warmest month of the year is August with an average maximum temperature of 91.9 °F, while the coldest month of the year is January with an average minimum temperature of 57.8 °F. The annual average precipitation at Coconut Creek is 57.27 inches with each month exceeding 2.4 inches of total rainfall on average. Summer months tend to be wetter than winter months. The wettest month of the year is June with an average rainfall of 7.31 Inches.

Climate data for Coconut Creek, FL
Month	Jan	Feb	Mar	Apr	May	Jun	Jul	Aug	Sep	Oct	Nov	Dec	Year
Mean daily maximum °F (°C)	76.5 (24.7)	77.0 (25.0)	80.2 (26.8)	83.3 (28.5)	86.8 (30.4)	90.0 (32.2)	91.8 (33.2)	91.9 (33.3)	90.6 (32.6)	86.7 (30.4)	82.0 (27.8)	77.7 (25.4)	84.5 (29.2)
Mean daily minimum °F (°C)	57.8 (14.3)	58.1 (14.5)	61.9 (16.6)	66.0 (18.9)	70.6 (21.4)	73.7 (23.2)	74.8 (23.8)	75.2 (24.0)	74.3 (23.5)	70.5 (21.4)	66.0 (18.9)	60.7 (15.9)	67.5 (19.7)
Average precipitation inches (mm)	2.78 (71)	2.76 (70)	3.0 (76)	3.4 (86)	5.73 (146)	7.31 (186)	5.94 (151)	6.91 (176)	7.01 (178)	5.73 (146)	4.24 (108)	2.46 (62)	57.27 (1,455)

== Demographics ==
Historical population
Census	Pop.	Note	%±
1970	1,359		—
1980	6,288		362.7%
1990	27,485		337.1%
2000	43,566		58.5%
2010	52,909		21.4%
2020	57,833		9.3%
2022 (est.)	57,348	▼	−0.8%
U.S. Decennial Census

=== Racial and ethnic composition ===
Coconut Creek racial composition (Hispanics excluded from racial categories) (NH = Non-Hispanic)
Race	Pop 2010	Pop 2020	% 2010	% 2020
White (NH)	31,570	25,539	59.67%	44.16%
Black or African American (NH)	6,882	9,327	13.01%	16.13%
Native American or Alaska Native (NH)	47	55	0.09%	0.10%
Asian (NH)	1,992	2,167	3.76%	3.75%
Pacific Islander or Native Hawaiian (NH)	17	27	0.03%	0.05%
Some other race (NH)	569	1,402	1.08%	2.42%
Two or more races/Multiracial (NH)	1,032	4,783	1.95%	8.27%
Hispanic or Latino (any race)	10,800	14,533	20.41%	25.13%
Total	52,909	57,833		

=== 2020 census ===
As of the 2020 census, Coconut Creek had a population of 57,833. The median age was 42.0 years. 19.5% of residents were under the age of 18 and 19.1% of residents were 65 years of age or older. For every 100 females there were 86.8 males, and for every 100 females age 18 and over there were 84.0 males age 18 and over.

100.0% of residents lived in urban areas, while 0.0% lived in rural areas.

There were 24,262 households in Coconut Creek, of which 28.7% had children under the age of 18 living in them. Of all households, 43.4% were married-couple households, 17.0% were households with a male householder and no spouse or partner present, and 32.8% were households with a female householder and no spouse or partner present. About 30.2% of all households were made up of individuals and 14.2% had someone living alone who was 65 years of age or older.

There were 26,971 housing units, of which 10.0% were vacant. The homeowner vacancy rate was 2.2% and the rental vacancy rate was 7.0%.

Racial composition as of the 2020 census
Race	Number	Percent
White	28,851	49.9%
Black or African American	9,611	16.6%
American Indian and Alaska Native	144	0.2%
Asian	2,212	3.8%
Native Hawaiian and Other Pacific Islander	29	0.1%
Some other race	4,848	8.4%
Two or more races	12,138	21.0%
Hispanic or Latino (of any race)	14,533	25.1%

=== 2010 census ===
As of the 2010 United States census, there were 52,909 people, 22,028 households, and 13,239 families residing in the city.

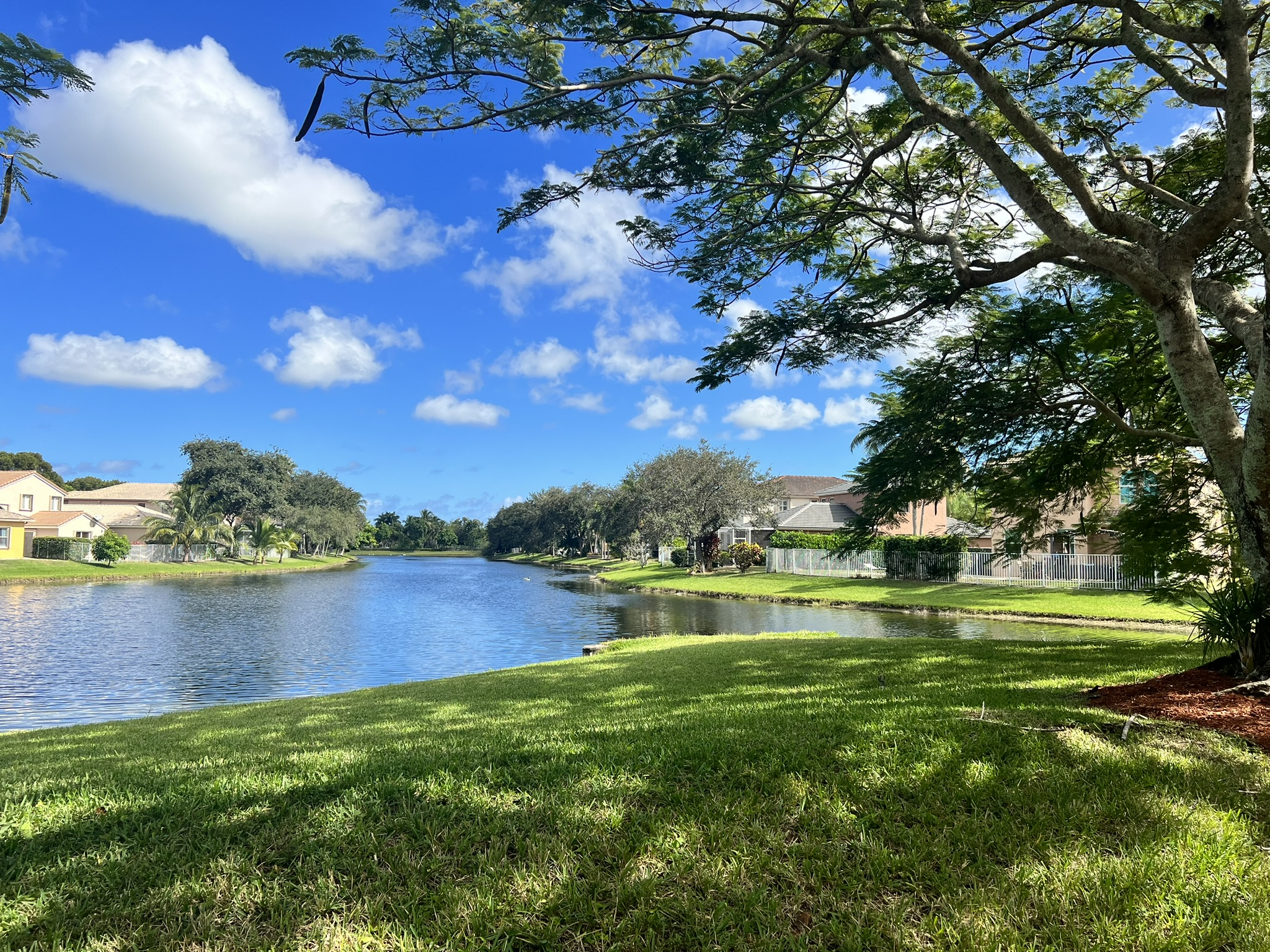
Residential Coconut Creek homes along a lake.

=== 2000 census ===
In 2000, there were 20,093 households, out of which 22.0% had children under the age of 18 living with them, 49.4% were married couples living together, 7.7% had a female householder with no husband present, and 40.1% were non-families. 32.5% of all households were made up of individuals, and 18.0% had someone living alone who was 65 years of age or older. The average household size was 2.16 and the average family size was 2.73.

In 2000, the city the population was spread out, with 18.0% under the age of 18, 5.6% from 18 to 24, 31.3% from 25 to 44, 18.6% from 45 to 64, and 26.5% who were 65 years of age or older. The median age was 41 years. For every 100 females, there were 86.8 males. For every 100 females age 18 and over, there were 82.5 males.

As of 2000, the median income for a household in the city was $43,980, and the median income for a family was $55,131. Males had a median income of $40,965 versus $31,188 for females. The per capita income for the city was $25,590. About 5.1% of families and 7.1% of the population were below the poverty line, including 10.5% of those under age 18 and 5.3% of those age 65 or over.

As of 2000, speakers of English as a first language accounted for 79.23% of residents, and Spanish made up of 11.18%. Other languages spoken as a first language were Portuguese 1.79%, Italian 1.40%, Yiddish 1.37%, and French at 1.17% of the population.

As of 2000, Coconut Creek was the twenty-sixth most Brazilian-populated area in the U.S. (tied with Belle Isle, Big Pine Key, and several other areas in the Northeast) at 1.2% of the population.

== Economy ==
=== Largest employers ===
According to the city's 2018 Comprehensive Annual Financial Report, the largest employers in the city are:

#	Employer	# of Employees
1	Seminole Casino Coconut Creek	2,000
2	Broward College - North Campus	998
3	Broward County Public Schools	908
4	Publix	608
5	Atlantic Technical College	469
6	City of Coconut Creek	410
7	Walmart	326
8	Food for the Poor	324
9	Al Hendrickson Toyota	302
10	Vista BMW	300

== Education ==
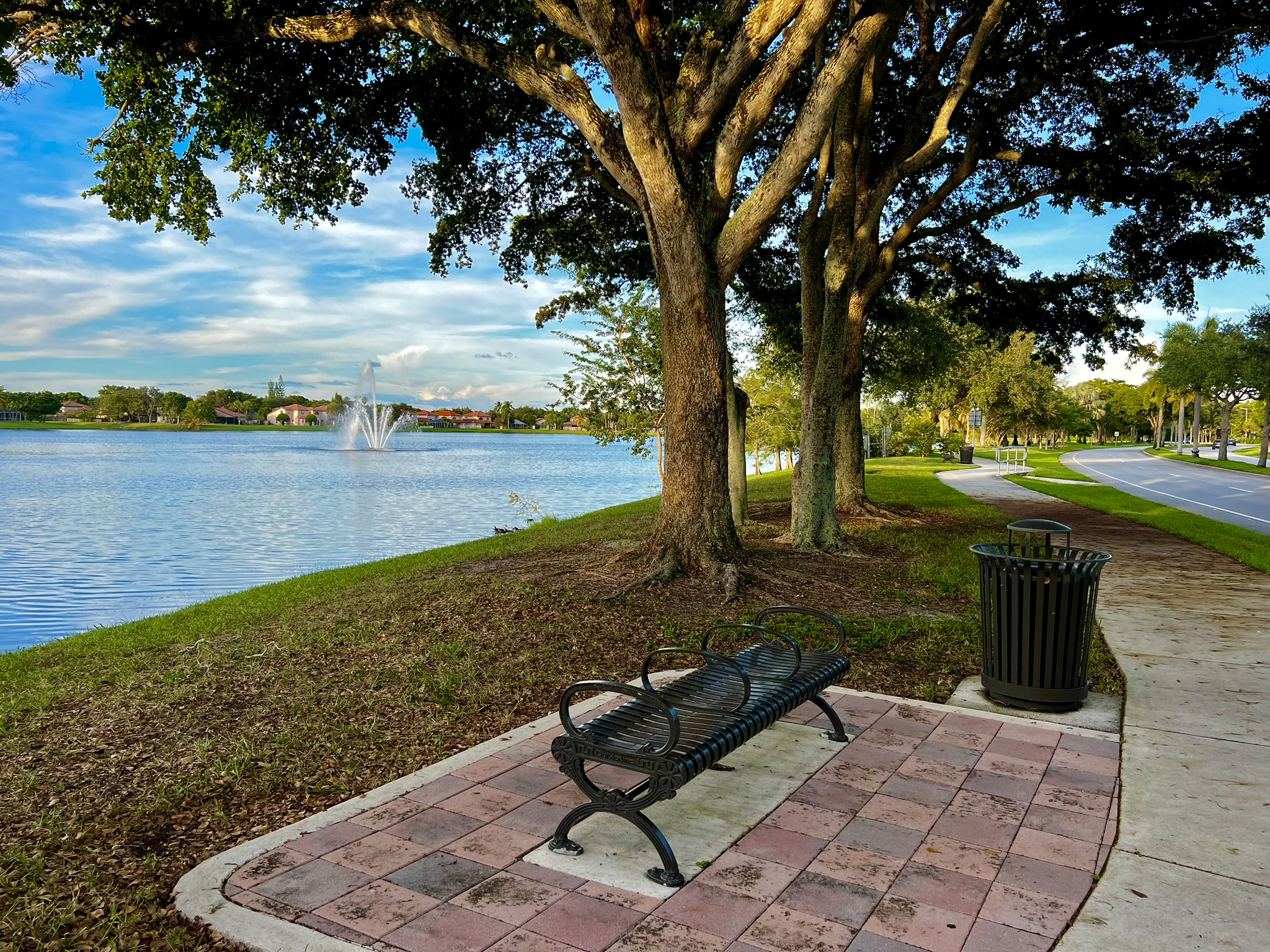
Winston Park Lake

Coconut Creek is served by seven public schools operated by Broward County Public Schools.

Elementary schools

- Coconut Creek Elementary
- Tradewinds Elementary
- Winston Park Elementary
- Outside of the city limits: Liberty Elementary in Margate

Middle school

- Lyons Creek Middle School
- Outside of the city limits: Margate Middle School in Margate

High schools

- Coconut Creek High School
- Monarch High School
- Atlantic Technical Center and Technical High School - magnet school for the northern part of the county

Private schools

- North Broward Preparatory School

Higher education

- Broward College (North Campus)

== Points of interest ==
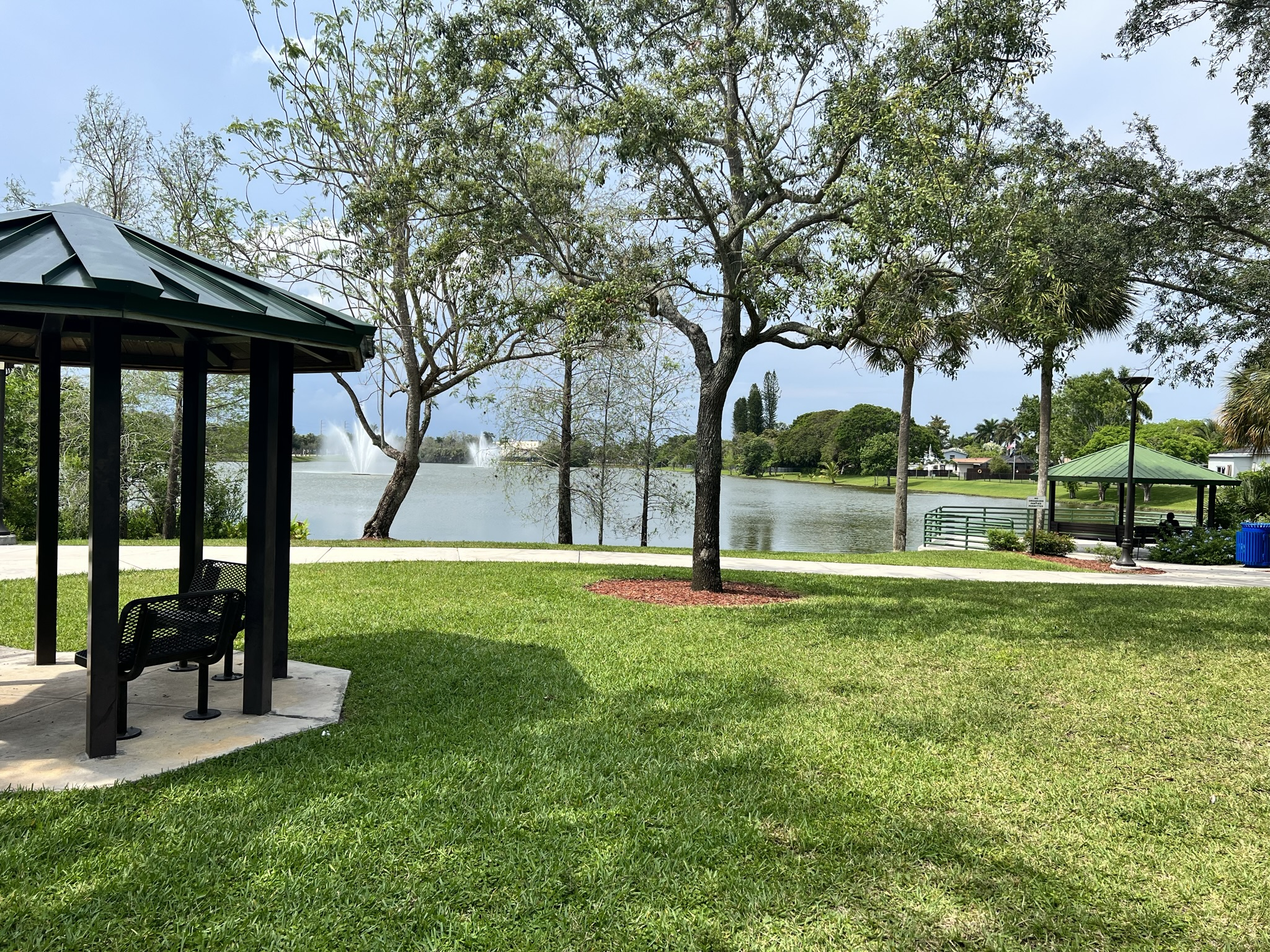
Windmill Park in Coconut Creek

- American Top Team headquarters
- Butterfly World in Tradewinds Park
- Coconut Creek Community Center
- Coconut Creek Recreation Complex
- Goldcoast Ballroom
- Sabal Pines Park
- Seminole Casino Coconut Creek
- The Promenade at Coconut Creek
- Tradewinds Park & Stables
- Windmill Park

== Notable people ==
- Thiago Alves (born 1983) – UFC fighter
- Jana Bieger (born 1989) – gymnast
- Lepa Brena (born 1960) – singer, actress, and co-founder of Grand Production
- Bobby Cannavale (born 1970) – actor
- Ian Fray (born 2002) – soccer player
- Wilson Gouveia (born 1978) – UFC fighter
- Al Harris – NFL cornerback, member of Green Bay Packers Hall of Fame, NFL defensive backs coach
- Mat Latos (born 1987) – MLB player
- Robbie Lawler (born 1982) – UFC fighter and former welterweight champion
- Héctor Lombard (born 1978) – UFC fighter and Bellator Middleweight Champion
- Alexandre Pantoja (born 1990) – UFC fighter and flyweight world champion
- Calvin Ridley (born 1994) – NFL player
- Yoel Romero (born 1977) – UFC fighter, former World Champion, and Olympian in freestyle wrestling
- Gregory Rousseau (born 2000) – NFL player
- Andrew Yogan (born 1991) – hockey player
