= Butterfly World =

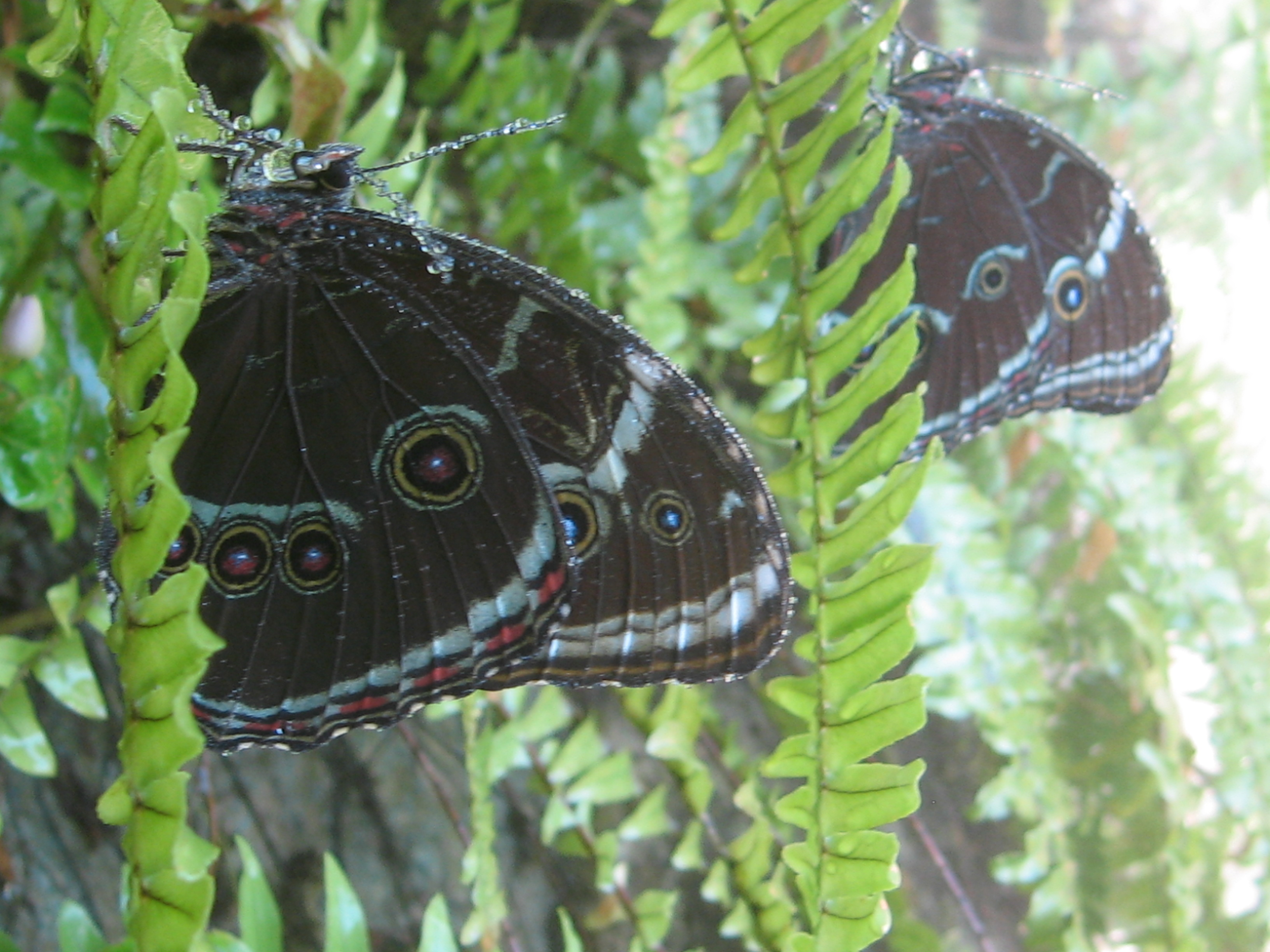
- Morpho peleides at Butterfly World
- Interactive map of Butterfly World
- 26.2684034°N 80.1713133°W
- Date opened: March 28, 1988
- Location: Coconut Creek, Florida, United States
- Land area: 10 acres (4.0 hectares)
- No. of animals: ~20,000 (butterflies)
- No. of species: 50 (butterflies)
- Website: www.butterflyworld.com

Butterfly World is located in Tradewinds Park in Coconut Creek, Florida. It opened in 1988, and it is the largest butterfly park in the world, and the first park of its kind in the Western Hemisphere. The facility houses around 20,000 live butterflies.

== History ==
After retiring from a career as electrical engineer, Ronald Boender started raising butterflies and their food plants in his home in Florida. In 1984 he established MetaScience to help supply farmed butterflies to zoos and universities. After having visited England in 1985, where he met Clive Farrell (founder and owner of the London Butterfly House), he decided to create his own facility in Florida. Boender and Farrell entered into partnership and started planning the facility, which was to be a public attraction, but also a research facility and a butterfly farm.

Butterfly World opened on March 28, 1988. Since then it has expanded to include the largest free flight hummingbird aviary in the United States, a Lorikeet Encounter, and an aviculture research center.

== Exhibits ==
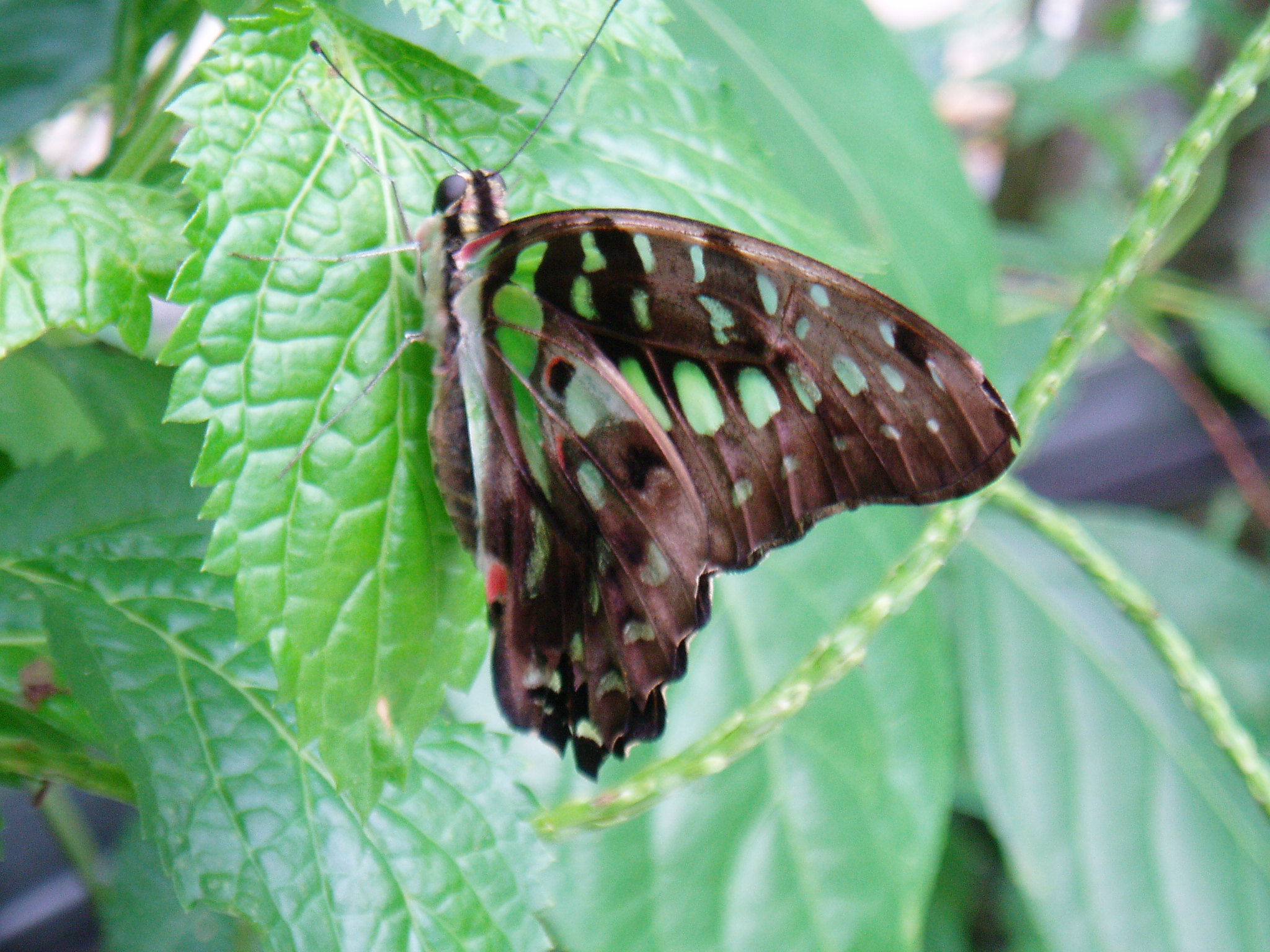
Graphium agamemnon at Butterfly World.

The Paradise Adventure Aviary includes fountains with ponds, and butterflies. The Hanging Garden & Butterfly Emerging Area has display cases with hanging pupa and emerging butterflies. The Tropical Rain Forest Aviary includes a waterfall, tropical plants, free flying birds, and butterflies.

Grace Gardens is an outdoor botanical garden with flowering tropical plants. The Wings of the World Secret Garden has one of the largest collections of flowering Passion Flower vines in the world. The Jewels of the Sky Aviary is where exotic birds can be seen.

The Museum/Insectarium features exhibits of mounted specimens of beetles, scorpions, butterflies, moths, and other insects. The Bug Zoo displays live insects including water bugs, spiders, wasps, walking sticks, and mantises.

Visitors can view the laboratory where the butterflies are raised and can see the different stages including eggs, caterpillars, and pupae.

== Conservation ==
Passiflora Society International was established at Butterfly World to encourage research on and help share information about passion flowers, which are the source of food for many butterflies. Butterfly World has also helped establish the Boender Endangered Species Laboratory at the University of Florida, which is helping reintroduce the Schaus swallowtail to Southern Florida.

== Gallery ==
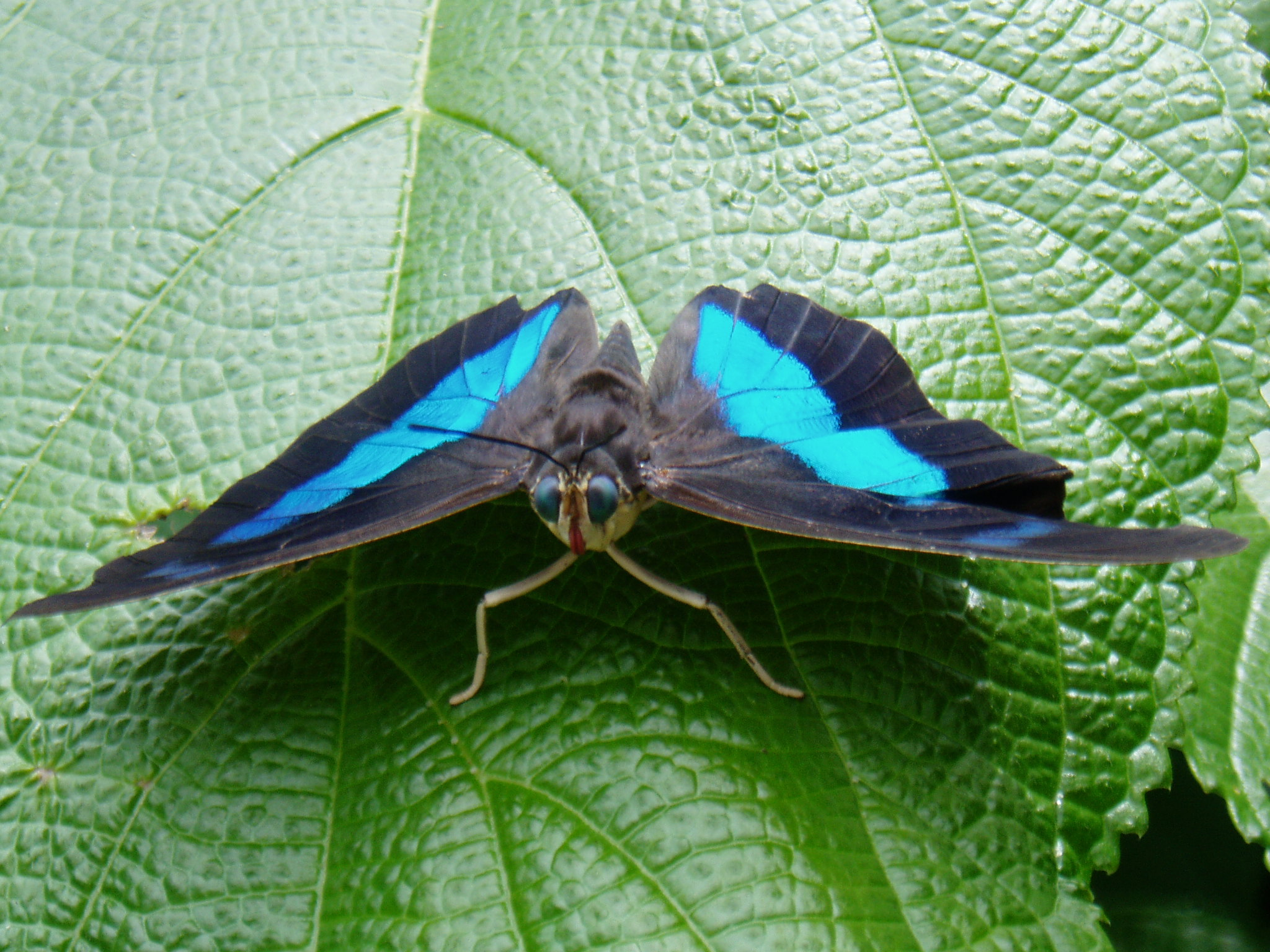
Archaeoprepona demophon

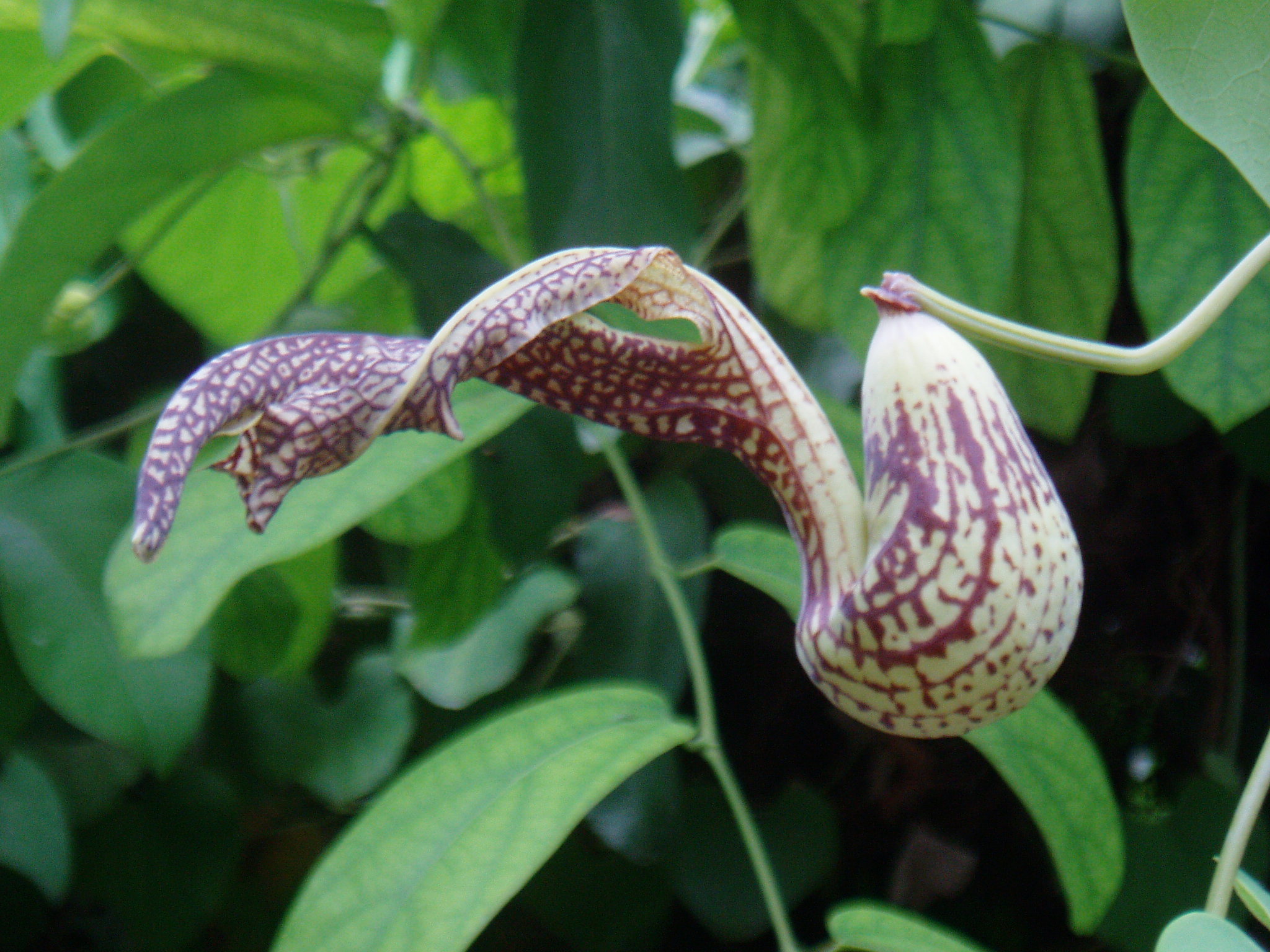
Aristolochia gibertii

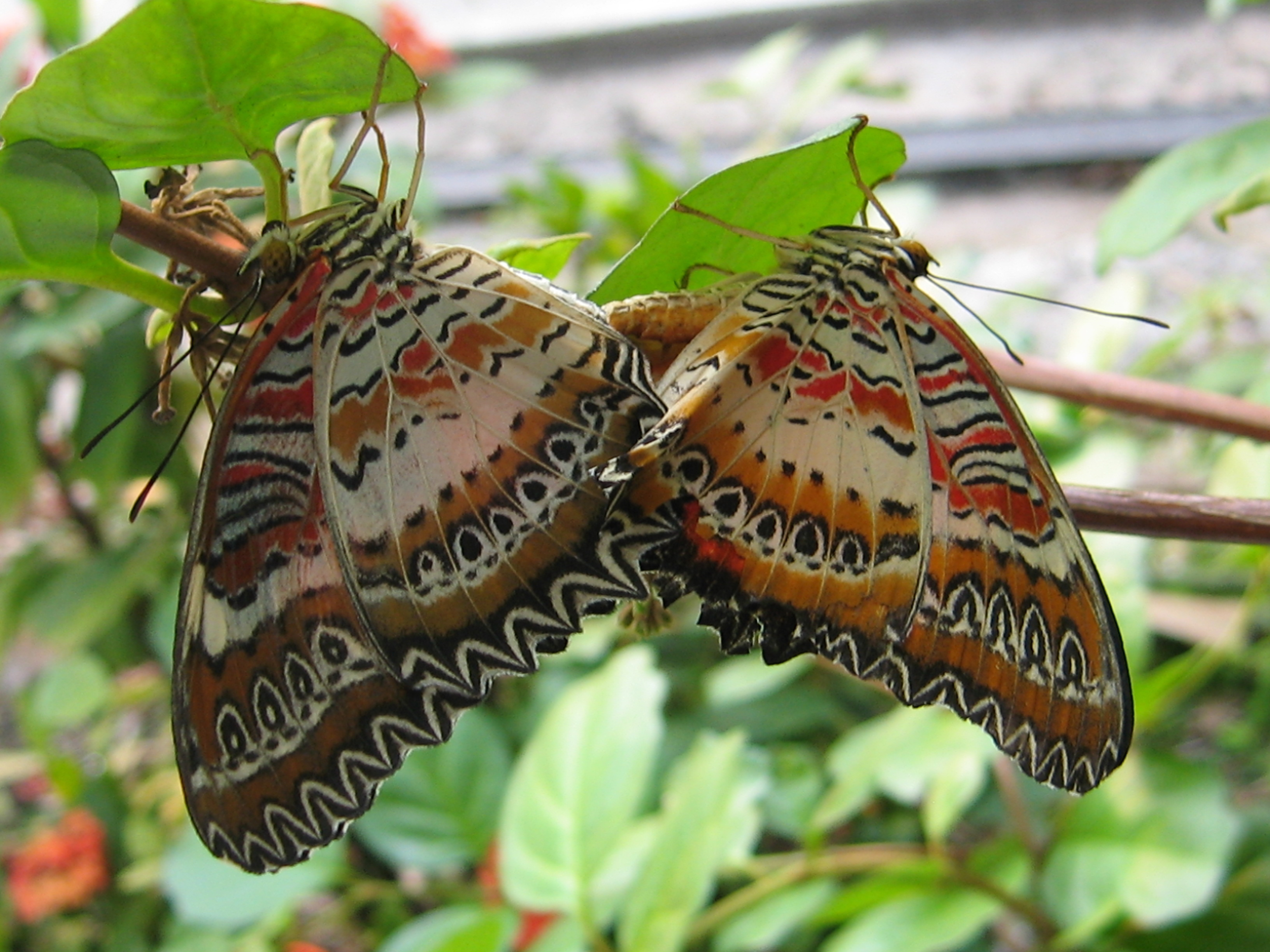
Cethosia hypsea

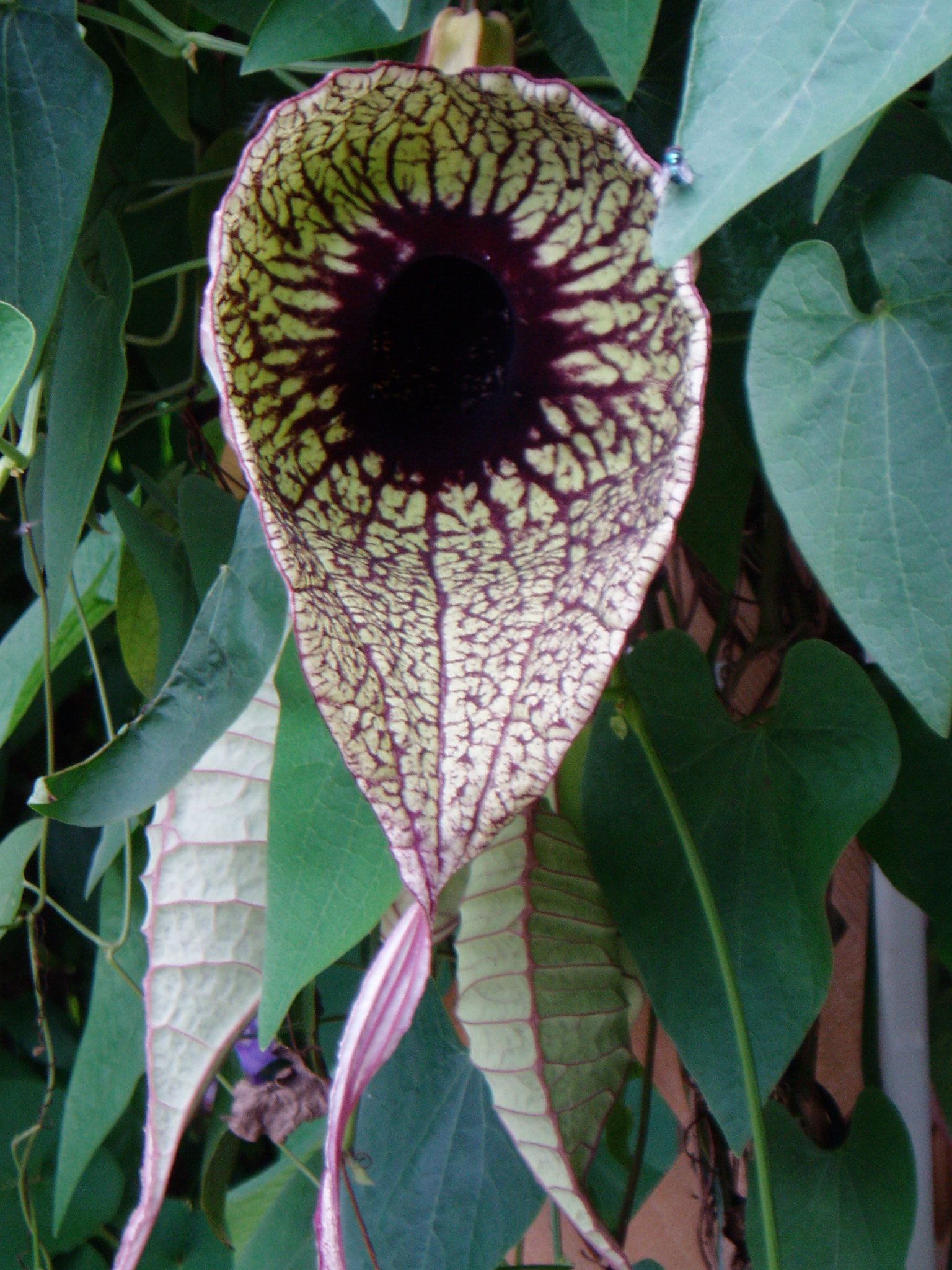
Aristolochia grandiflora

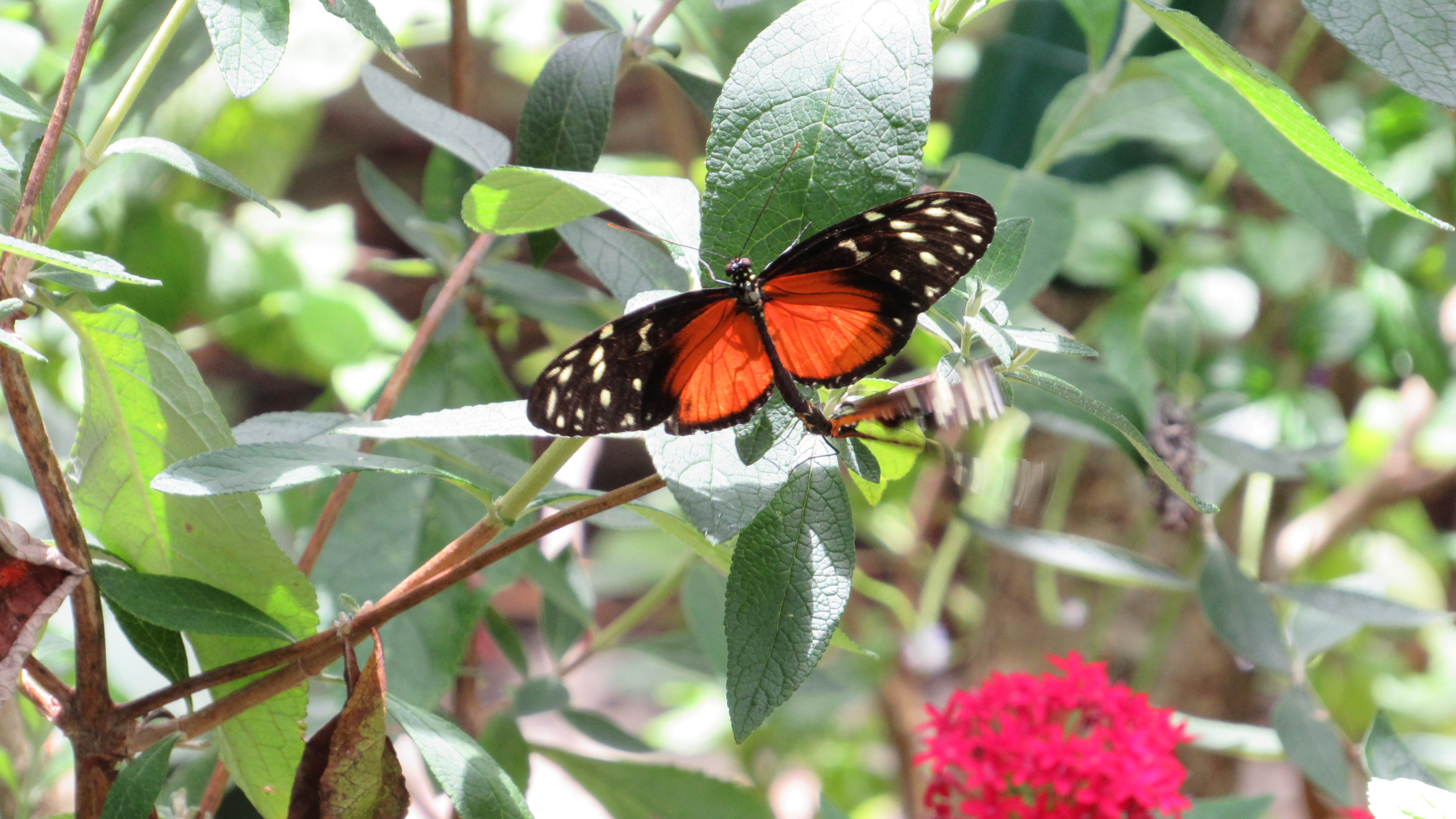
Family: ITHOMIDAE The Glasswings

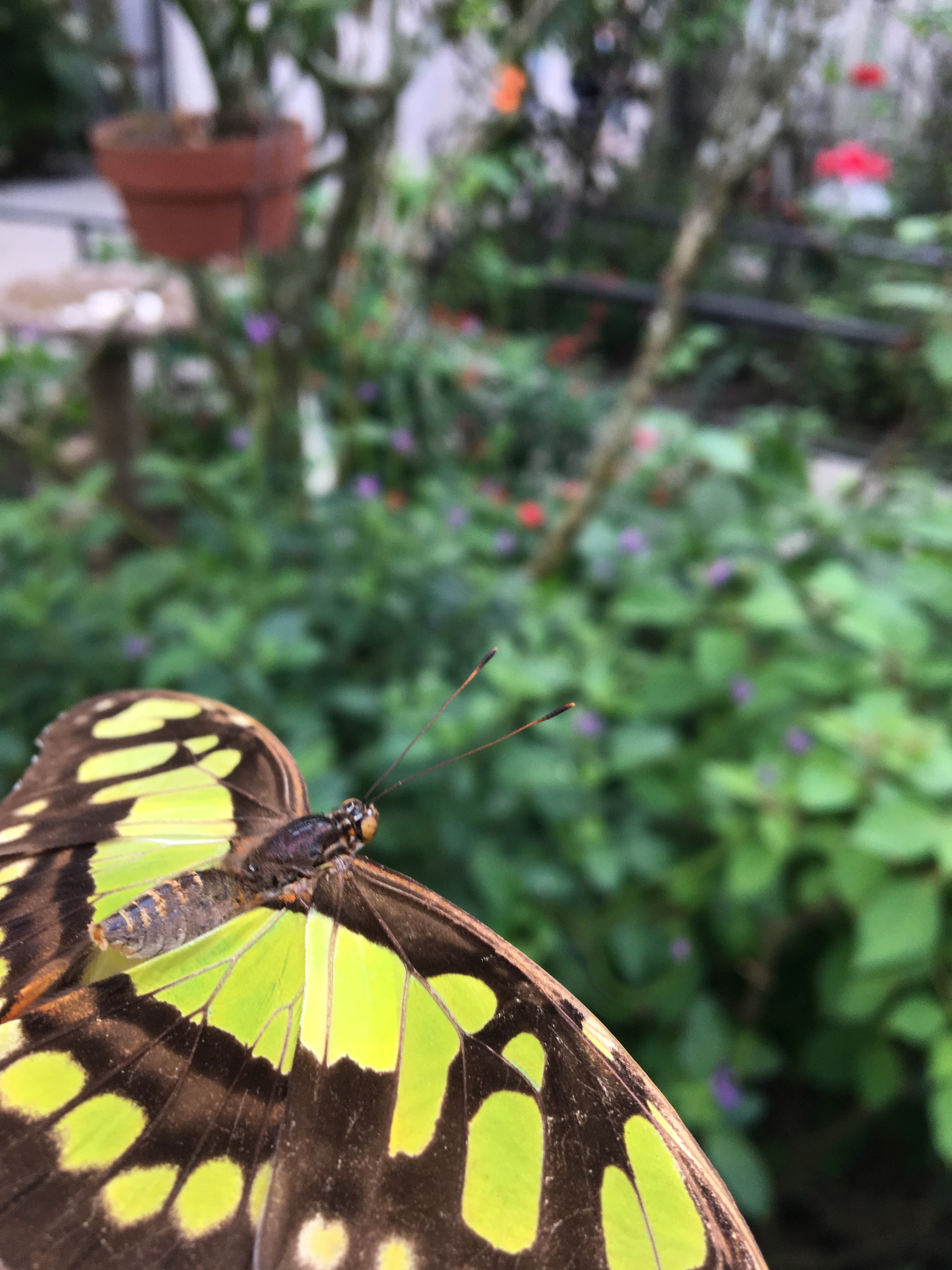
Malachite Butterfly
