= Hell's Kitchen (American TV series) season 1 =

First season of the US television series

Hell's Kitchen
- Season 1
- Region 1 DVD cover
- Hosted by: Gordon Ramsay
- No. of contestants: 12
- Winner: Michael Wray
- Runner-up: Ralph Pagano
- No. of episodes: 11

Release
- Original network: Fox
- Original release: May 30 – August 1, 2005

Season chronology
- Next → Season 2

The inaugural season of the American competitive reality television series Hell's Kitchen premiered on Fox on May 30, 2005, and concluded on August 1, 2005. Gordon Ramsay was the host and head chef, while Scott Leibfried was the Blue Team's sous-chef and Mary-Ann Salcedo was the Red Team's sous-chef. Jean-Philippe Susilovic was maître d'.

The season was won by professional chef Michael Wray, with fellow professional chef Ralph Pagano finishing second.

== Chefs ==
Twelve chefs competed in season one.

Contestant	Age (at time of filming)	Occupation	Hometown	Result
Michael Wray	27	Professional Chef	Fort Collins, Colorado	Winner
Ralph Pagano	36	Professional Chef	Livingston, New Jersey	Runner-up
Jessica Cabo	26	Headhunter	Huntington, New York	Eliminated before finals
Elsie Ramos	40	Mother of Six	Maywood, New Jersey	Eliminated after eighth service
James "Jimmy" Casey	25	Purchasing Supervisor	Williston Park, New York	Eliminated after seventh service
Andrew Bonito	24	Office Assistant	Livingston, New Jersey	Eliminated after sixth service
Chris North	35	Executive Chef	Yorktown Heights, New York	Eliminated after fifth service
Mary Ellen Daniels	27	Bartender	Belmont, Massachusetts	Eliminated after fourth service
Wendy Liu	32	Account Manager	Millburn, New Jersey	Eliminated after third service
Jeff LaPoff	28	Finance Manager	Orange, New Jersey	Quit during third service
Jeffery Dewberry	33	Pastry Chef	Stockbridge, Georgia	Eliminated after second service
Carolann Valentino	33	Server's Assistant	Dallas, Texas	Eliminated after first service

== Contestant progress ==
Each week, the best member from the losing team during the latest service period ("least bad" as determined by Ramsay) is asked to nominate two of their teammates for elimination; one of these two is sent home by Gordon Ramsay.

No.	Chef	Original teams		Switched teams				Individuals			Finals
No.	Chef	101	102	103	104	105	106	107	108	109	110/111
1	Michael	WIN	WIN	WIN	WIN	BoW	WIN	IN	IN	IN	WINNER
2	Ralph	WIN	WIN	BoW	LOSE	WIN	NOM	BoW	IN	IN	RUNNER-UP
3	Jessica	WIN	WIN	LOSE	BoW	WIN	BoW	NOM	NOM	OUT	Michael's team
4	Elsie	BoW	LOSE	WIN	WIN	NOM	WIN	IN	OUT		Michael's team
5	Jimmy	LOSE	LOSE	WIN	WIN	LOSE	WIN	OUT			Michael's team
6	Andrew	WIN	WIN	NOM	NOM	WIN	OUT				Ralph's team
7	Chris	LOSE	BoW	WIN	WIN	OUT					
8	Mary Ellen	WIN	WIN	LOSE	OUT						
9	Wendy	WIN	WIN	OUT							Ralph's team
10	Jeff	LOSE	NOM	LEFT							
11	Dewberry	NOM	OUT								Ralph's team
12	Carolann	OUT									

Keywords

- WIN = Won the dinner service
- LOSE = Lost the dinner service
- BoB = Best of the Best, usually exempt from nomination
- BoW = Best of the Worst, sometimes exempt from nomination
- IN = not nominated for elimination
- NOM = nominated for elimination
- OUT = eliminated normally
- LEFT = withdrew from competition
- HOSP = eliminated due to hospitalization
- EJEC = eliminated during service

Color key
Chef was eliminated after regular nomination
Chef was eliminated after Ramsay's nomination
Chef was eliminated without nomination
Chef was eliminated from winning team
Chef was eliminated in the Cook For Your Life challenge
Chef was nominated to participate in the Cook For Your Life challenge
Chef was eliminated during service
Chef withdrew from the competition
Chef was the Best of the Best/Worst
Chef was retained after regular nomination
Chef was retained after Ramsay's nomination
Chef's nomination was voided
The winner of Hell's Kitchen
The runner-up of Hell's Kitchen

== Episodes ==
Each episode consisted of a challenge with a reward, a service, and an elimination.

No. overall	No. in season	Title	Original release date	U.S. viewers (millions)
1	1	"Day 1"	May 30, 2005	6.80
Twelve aspiring chefs arrived at Hell's Kitchen, where they were introduced to Jean-Phillipe and Sous-chefs Mary-Ann and Scott. They were then immediately tasked with their first challenge. Signature dishes: The chefs had 45 minutes to cook Ramsay their signature dish. Carolann's chicken parmesan received praise, while Elsie's turkey tacos were deemed "not bad" despite the underwhelming presentation. The other dishes were all poorly received; Ramsay spat out Andrew's "Absolute Penne", calling it "absolute dogshit", found Mary Ellen's endive salad boring, and Wendy's fried rice with Chinese sausage unimpressive. He also spat out Jimmy's pan-seared stuffed chicken breast, which was overcooked on the outside and raw on the inside, describing it as a "dehydrated camel's turd", and hated Ralph's seared rare tuna and sesame noodles. Dewberry's baked spaghetti was overcooked, Chris' cedar-roasted salmon was raw, and Jeff's steak and mushrooms were rated "one out of ten" since the steak was overcooked, even though the sauce was good. The aioli for Jessica's soft-shelled crabs was far too hot, and Michael's scallops were deemed "disgusting". After the challenge, the chefs were divided into two teams: the Blue Team (Andrew, Jessica, Mary Ellen, Michael, Ralph and Wendy), and the Red Team (Carolann, Chris, Dewberry, Elsie, Jeff and Jimmy). They then prepared for their first dinner service. Service: Ramsay assigned Jeff and Ralph as waiters and would work with Jean-Philippe in the dining room. In the red kitchen, despite Elsie being strong on appetizers after initially overcooking risotto, Chris overcooked salmon, Jimmy served poor lamb and burnt his hand, Carolann stood at the dessert station instead of helping, Jeff struggled as a waiter, and Dewberry was slow. In the blue team, although Ralph received positive feedback as a waiter, Ramsay scolded Andrew for asking questions instead of serving his dessert, Wendy ran out of potatoes, and Michael nearly ran out of lobster for the spaghetti. Ramsay shut both kitchens down after customers began walking out. Ramsay named the red team losers but made it clear to the blue team that they did not win but were simply safe. Elsie was named best of the worst for the red team and told to nominate two chefs for elimination. Elimination: Elsie nominated Carolann and Dewberry. Ramsay told Jimmy and Jeff they had dodged a bullet, then eliminated Carolann for her lack of teamwork during service and lack of experience. Carolann's comment: "I am very angry because when you're presented with an opportunity to do something great, and then you see that disappear, it's... very disappointing." Ramsay's comment: "Some can handle it, some can't. I'm not interested in the ones that can't."
2	2	"Day 2"	June 6, 2005	6.98
Team challenge: For their first team challenge, both teams had to clean and prep squid to Ramsay's standards. To even the teams out, Michael was forced to sit out due to having good experience with prepping seafood. For the red team, Jeff, Jimmy, Elsie and Chris scored one, and Dewberry scored two. For the blue team, Ralph and Mary Ellen scored two, and Jessica scored one, but Wendy and Andrew scored zero, giving the red team a 6–5 win. Reward/punishment: The red team received dinner with Ramsay. The blue team prepped the remaining squid for service and were forced to go through service without air conditioning. Service: In the red kitchen, while Chris had a strong performance and assisted Elsie on fish, Jeff forgot an order of spinach before burning it, and Dewberry almost walked out after struggling on beef Wellingtons. In the blue kitchen, Wendy needed Ralph's help to get risotto out, Mary Ellen struggled to assemble Caesar salad, Michael was chewed out by Ramsay for complaining about the heat, and Mary Ellen undercooked Wellingtons while bickering with Andrew over control of the meat station until sous chef Scott stepped in. When one of the red team's tables, tired of the long wait, attempted to have pizza delivered, Jean-Philippe told them they weren't allowed to, only for a customer to shove him in the chest. Seeing this, Ramsay shut down both kitchens for the second time in a row. Ramsay named the blue team winners for serving more entrees; Chris was named best of the worst. Elimination: Chris nominated Dewberry and Jeff. Ramsay eliminated Dewberry for his second poor performance, almost abandoning his team, and being too much of a coward. Dewberry's comment: "Well, what happened happened. I mean, I can't say that I didn't deserve it. I kind of felt like I was making a comeback, but I was not justified in walking out on my team." Ramsay's comment: "I'm looking for someone who can weather the storm, inspire individuals, stand as a great leader. That, clearly, is not Dewberry."
3	3	"Day 3"	June 13, 2005	7.54
Team change: Prior to the challenge, Ramsay transferred Michael to the red team to rebalance the teams. Team challenge: Both teams had to cook a five-course meal using $100 and 10 minutes of shopping time at a local supermarket. Elsie scored over Jessica on the cold appetizers, both Jeff and Ralph scored on the hot appetizers, Wendy scored over Chris on the fish entree, Michael scored over Andrew on the meat entree, and Mary-Ellen scored over Jimmy on desserts. As a tie-breaker, Ramsay deemed that the red team's dishes went together better, giving them the win, while criticizing Andrew for serving peaches with ribeye and Jessica's pineapple and potato tartare. Reward/punishment: The red team had dinner with Ramsay at The Cat & Fiddle, a local pub. The blue team had to clean the dorms. Service: Two food critics attended service, sampling both teams. In the red kitchen, the appetizers were praised despite Jeff needing Michael's help after putting unequal amounts of lobster in two spaghetti. After Jeff's departure, Michael took over the meat section and received praise for the lamb from the critics. In the blue kitchen, Wendy filled pasta with cold water instead of hot, causing her to undercook the spaghetti she served to the critics. Andrew had an overly salty risotto returned after it made a customer vomit. Ralph put in a strong performance on entrees, helping Jessica on garnish, though Wendy's lamb entree received mixed reviews. Ramsay shut both kitchens down for the third time in a row. Ramsay named the red team winners, as the critics preferred their spaghetti and lamb over the blue team's; Ralph was named best of the worst. Jeff's exit: After arguing with Ramsay over slowing down the kitchen on meat, Jeff called Ramsay an asshole under his breath, only for sous chef Maryann to order him to repeat himself out loud, prompting him to walk out and withdraw from the competition, saying he had had enough. It turns out before the ending credits, Jeff left due to a sprained ankle. Jeff gave no comment on his departure. Elimination: Ralph nominated Wendy and Andrew. Although Andrew had made a customer ill, Ramsay eliminated Wendy for struggling in all three services. Wendy's comment: "It’s been an absolute horrible night. Nothing went right. I feel like I let myself down, I let the team down, and I let Chef down. I’m disappointed that I didn’t get further. I think that’s really the biggest emotion I’m feeling right now." Ramsay's comment: "The third night of Hell's Kitchen was shocking, really bad. I'm hoping we step up a gear, we raise our game, and we start coming together as a proper restaurant. Jeff, well, I had to laugh at the end when he called me an arsehole. I've been called far worse than that. Wendy, well, you know, it's about time I put you out of your misery."
4	4	"Day 4"	June 20, 2005	6.93
Team challenge: The teams had to set up a dining table to Ramsay's standards. The red team made four mistakes while the blue team made one, giving the blue team their first challenge victory; Jimmy was berated for not knowing how to fold napkins properly. Reward/punishment: The blue team was given spa treatments in the dorms. The red team had to clean silverware and set up all the tables in the dining room before service, while Chris had to serve champagne to the blue team. Service: Ramsay announced that the first team to serve all their tables would win service. In the blue kitchen, while Jessica performed well on meat, Andrew brought up the wrong garnishes, and Mary Ellen had three risottos returned for being bland before forgetting an order of tuna. In the red kitchen, Jimmy talked back to Ramsay after serving cold garnish, but he recovered. Elsie put in a strong performance on meat with Chris' encouragement, helping the red team finish five tables ahead of the blue and giving them the win. At this point, Ramsay shut down the blue kitchen and named Jessica best of the worst. Elimination: Jessica nominated Andrew and Mary Ellen. Although the rest of the team wanted Andrew gone, Ramsay eliminated Mary Ellen for her inconsistency and being the main reason her team lost due to the risotto failures; though he warned Andrew he was on his last chance. Mary Ellen's comment: "I think that Chef Ramsay's decision tonight was the wrong decision. I don't believe I was the weak link on the team tonight. I think, as shown in the past, it was Andrew that was the weak link. I think that Andrew will be joining me shortly." Ramsay's comment: "Mary Ellen has left Hell's Kitchen because of her inconsistency. What the rest of the team should understand, is that it is very crucial to get better and more consistent. That didn't happen with Mary Ellen."
5	5	"Day 5"	June 27, 2005	7.13
Team challenge: Ramsay created a new menu featuring pasta dishes for service. The teams had 20 minutes to turn raw dough into pasta by Ramsay's standards. Since the red team had an extra member, Chris was forced to sit out. The blue team had 2.41 pounds of pasta accepted but the red team won with 2.45 pounds. Reward/punishment: The red team received a gondola ride. The blue team prepped the remaining pasta for service. Service: The service was filled to double capacity, forcing the teams to take turns cooking and working in the dining room. The red team got to choose to cook first for winning the challenge. Jimmy served soup on dirty plates. Elsie got confused over what entrees were on order, and Chris was scolded for saying "Oui chef" to Ramsay, but Michael was strong on desserts. The dishes the blue team served were satisfactory but slow, partially due to Michael convincing the customers to order as much lasagna as possible. Ralph had a tortellini rejected due to poor plating, but was otherwise strong on appetizers. Andrew struggled to give times on his short ribs before overcooking them twice, which Ramsay compared to a dog's dinner. The blue team continued to lag, forcing Ramsay to close service. Jimmy was the worst waiter of the night, as he brought the wrong order to a table while some customers complained about him sweating a lot. Even though the red team served more of their customers, Ramsay named the blue team winners for having a higher overall quality of food despite being short a member; Michael was named the best of the worst. Elimination: Michael nominated Elsie and Chris. Ramsay called Jimmy a bullet dodger for the second time, but ultimately eliminated Chris for failing to live up to his executive chef position. Chris's comment: "I was an executive chef. I worked real hard to get it, and I’m not ashamed of it. I belong there, I belong to be the last one standing, so Michael took the easy way out." Ramsay's comment: "When you come into the kitchen and announce that you are an executive chef, you expect a little bit more than what I got from Chris. If he's been telling the world that he has that amount of knowledge, then he should have been ten times better."
6	6	"Day 6"	July 11, 2005	5.66
Team challenge: The chefs had to taste and identify four different ingredients while wearing blindfolds and headphones. Both Andrew and Jimmy scored one, and Elsie scored three while Jessica scored zero. The red team automatically won the challenge 4-1 after Ralph misidentified his first two ingredients, making it impossible to catch up. Reward/punishment: The red team went wine tasting at L.A. restaurants with Ramsay. The blue team had to clean the restaurant's pots and pans and enter a code to enter their storeroom during service, which Ramsay only gave once to them. However, Andrew tried to cover the latch with masking tape only for sous chef Scott to stop him, as well as confiscate the blue team's needed materials from the storeroom. Service: Ramsay asked the teams to create their own menu, with diners choosing between them. Michael coordinated well with Jimmy and Elsie, but Ramsay had concerns that the red team's menu was rather ambitious. For the blue team, Ralph constantly shot down Jessica and Andrew's suggestions. The red team had a strong performance, their only problems being Jimmy undercooking and then overcooking scallops before Michael helped him, and later serving bland penne pasta. In the blue kitchen, Jessica had an appetizer returned for having hair in it. Andrew served halibut on cold plates, and Ralph's halibut course was returned six times for being overcooked and bland. When Ramsay asked Andrew to hurry up with the refire, Andrew argued that he couldn't make the halibut cook any faster. Ralph was also scolded for waving at a female customer. Ramsay shut down the kitchens after orders were getting backed up. The blue menu received more orders, but the red team won as they received more positive reviews; Jessica was named best of the worst and asked to nominate either Andrew or Ralph for elimination. Elimination: Jessica nominated Andrew; Ramsay also nominated Ralph. Andrew blamed Ralph for insisting on putting halibut on the menu and ignoring his suggestion, prompting Ramsay to eliminate him for his confrontational attitude and inconsistent performances. Andrew's comment: "Maybe, I wasn’t as successful in the kitchen, but I gotta tell you, I think I had the more integrity tonight. I spoke for myself, I stood up for myself, you know, and I... I said what needed to be said." Ramsay's comment: "So we're down to the final five. These are the best of the best and the cream is slowly rising to the top. But they really now have to start emerging as individual talent. Andrew's gone tonight because he's out of his depth. I discovered a fake. He can't cook."
7	7	"Day 7"	July 11, 2005	6.65
Ramsay merged the remaining five chefs into one team wearing black jackets, where each chef would compete as an individual. Challenge: The chefs had to recreate tableside fruit flambe to Ramsay's standards in five minutes. Jimmy won, narrowly beating out Elsie. Reward/punishment: Jimmy received a helicopter trip over L.A. and got to sample wine and caviar. He chose Michael, who received the worst review, to go with him. The others were forced to clean the dining room. Service: Ramsay decided to combine the menus the teams created for the previous service. For winning the challenge, Jimmy chose Elsie to serve the Caesar salad and flambe tableside. In addition, Ramsay chose Ralph to assist him at the hotplate, and gave sous chefs Scott and Maryann the night off. Jessica had a pan catch fire on the meat station before running out of filet mignon, forcing Michael to retrieve some from the storage room. Jimmy accidentally threw away a complete lobster dish, forgot to cook risotto, and talked back to Ramsay. After Jessica's station caught fire again, Ramsay shut down the kitchen; Ralph was named best of the worst. Elimination: Ralph nominated Jimmy and Jessica. Ramsay eliminated Jimmy for being the weakest chef out of the five, and for talking back to Ramsay, though he praised him and told him to be proud of how far he got throughout the competition. Jimmy's comment: "I've had no regrets about coming to Hell's Kitchen. If anything, it's broadened my horizons. I'm definitely not giving up on my dream of restauranteuring. Chef Ramsay said to keep on moving forward, and that really meant a lot to me coming from him, because this is what I really want to do with my life." Ramsay's comment: "Each and every one of these contestants now have to start emerging as individual talent. This is when we really start to find out who can handle the heat and who can't. Clearly tonight, Jimmy couldn't."
8	8	"Day 8"	July 18, 2005	6.70
Challenge: Ramsay gave the chefs fifteen minutes to create an original dish from a tray of fifteen leftovers from the previous service. Jessica's beef stew tasted good, but looked messy. Michael's pasta with chicken wings looked good but did not taste good, and received criticism for leaving the bones on the chicken. Ralph's sauteed chicken drumsticks also received praise for presentation but criticism for raw onions. Elsie's chicken soup won for being the best tasting. Reward/punishment: Elsie accompanied Ramsay to a taping of Good Day Live, where they demonstrated how to make risotto. The others had to do the prep for service. When they saw Elsie on TV, they conspired against her during service. Service: For winning the challenge, Elsie assigned the chefs to their stations; Ramsay reassigned the team twice due to inadequate communication. Jessica struggled to give times on her appetizers and had a lobster risotto rejected for looking sloppy. After getting switched to fish, she had a lobster dish returned with a piece of wood in it. Elsie struggled to prepare the penne appetizer and grew more and more lost and uncommunicative as the others refused to help her, so Ramsay sent her for a bathroom break. After two tables walked out, Ramsay shut the kitchen down. Due to the lack of cohesion and teamwork in the kitchen, Ramsay refused to declare a Best of the Worst and stated that would make the nominations himself. Elimination: Ramsay nominated Jessica and Elsie, eliminating Elsie for losing her composure during service, though praised her for performance throughout the competition. Elsie's comment: "I have no regrets. This has been the most exciting, hellish experience of my life. Coming into this, it was a long shot, and then I got as far as I did. I didn't win the restaurant, but I won... nonetheless." Ramsay's comment: "Now that we're down to the final three, what I am looking for, personally, is flair, creativity, great imagination, and, more importantly, individuality because it's now when they really have to start excelling."
9	9	"Day 9"	July 25, 2005	7.42
Challenge: The three finalists were tasked to create a soufflé in 10 minutes. Ralph won, with Michael second. Reward: Ralph received first choice in selecting a dish to make for service: beef, chicken, or tuna. Ralph chose beef and Michael chose tuna, leaving Jessica with chicken. Service: Unbeknownst to the chefs, their families (Michael's wife and in-laws; Jessica's mother, sister and girlfriend; Ralph's fiancée, mother and uncle) attended service and blindly voted for their favorite dish. Jessica got overwhelmed on souffles and needed help from Ralph and Michael, but eventually service was completed and every customer was served. Ralph's filet was ordered the most often, Michael's tuna the least. After service, the final three got to spend time with their loved ones, who were unaware that Ramsay would use their votes to determine whom to eliminate. Elimination: Out of nine votes, Michael's tuna received five (including his mother-in-law and all of Ralph's family members), Ralph's filet received three, and Jessica's chicken received only one (her sister). Ramsay eliminated Jessica for having the fewest votes, and not being as strong as Michael and Ralph, but praised her for being strong, feisty, clever, and never short a word, telling her how proud he was of her. As opposed to the rest of the eliminated contestants leaving throughout the back, Ramsey allowed Jessica to leave through the front door with her family. Jessica's comment: "Chef Ramsay was amazing. I mean, it was such an honor to work under him. I worked hard and, you know, smart, and I think that's what helped me get this far, so no regrets at all. This was such a great experience and something I'll hold with me for the rest of my life." Ramsay's comment: "Now we're down to the final two. This is it. But the fascinating thing about these two guys is they're both equally as good as one another. And this is where they have to now separate, put everything they've learned from Hell's Kitchen, and show me what they're made of. That's what I'm looking for."
10	10	"Day 10"	August 1, 2005	6.69
11	11	"Day 10"	August 1, 2005	8.94
Hell's Kitchen was then split into two for the final service, with Michael and Ralph decorating their own restaurant, choosing the service uniforms and creating the menu. Challenge: Michael and Ralph cooked their signature dishes for public opinion. Michael's braised short rib ossobuco won with a 12–6 score over Ralph's porterhouse steak for two. Practice service: The two finalists were given practice before service by cooking for the workers and having a turn at the pass. Michael showed great attention to detail, but initially lacked vocalness. Ralph was strong vocally, but lacked attention to detail and missed Michael deliberately sending a crab risotto without any crab. Restaurant designing: Michael created an L.A.-modern style theme-restaurant named Lola Pop after his wife, while Ralph created a New York style steakhouse named Frank & Lulu's after his and his friend's dogs. Reward: Michael was granted first pick in drafting a team using the six chefs eliminated prior to the final. (Note: Chris and Mary Ellen did not return; Wendy, as the last chef eliminated prior to the top eight, took Chris's place. However, Jeff did not return, so Dewberry, as the last chef eliminated prior to the Top 10, took Mary Ellen's place.) Michael picked Jessica, Jimmy and Elsie, while Ralph selected Andrew and Wendy, and was left with Dewberry. Service: Before service, Andrew required stitches after cutting his finger. In the red kitchen, Michael was initially quiet, Jessica struggled on lobster and refused to accept Michael's authority, Elsie served a salad with plastic in it and Jimmy sent a raw steak to the pass. In the blue kitchen, Ralph left the hot plate to help Wendy on appetizers, and Dewberry put fish stock in spaghetti before getting overheated and nearly fainting, but returned with Andrew's encouragement. Both teams finished service. Ramsay praised Michael and Ralph, saying one thing would help him make his decision: the number of customers who would return. Winner: Michael and Ralph each stood in front of two door; the former's door opened, making him the first winner of Hell's Kitchen. 94% of his customers said they would return, compared to 90% for Ralph. Ramsay then made Michael an offer: accept the original prize of his own restaurant, or join him in London to work alongside him at one of his restaurants. Michael accepted the offer to work in London. Ralph's comment: "I've said it before, win, lose, or draw. I’ve got no reservations about how I performed and what I did here. I did exactly what I said I was gonna do. I did the best I could. There's no loser, you know, Michael just happened to win." Michael's comment: "I feel, for the first time, I feel like I'm in control of my own future. I've proven myself to myself, and that's important. I think that I've really earned the right to be the head chef that I know that I am, and I am now, that's for sure. You know, I was blown away by Chef Ramsay's offer to either own my own restaurant or to move to London to train to become a world-class chef. You know, either way I choose, it's definitely a dream come true. Working with Chef Ramsay is an opportunity of a lifetime. You know, he's gonna enhance my credibility and reputation as a chef. So when I do open my own restaurant, I'm gonna have a much better chance of success." Ramsay's comment: "As Michael was celebrating the win of a restaurant, I realized that an individual of Michael's talent--that I didn't want to let him get away. Ralph was great tonight. But Michael deserved to win because his creativity and standards are simply on a higher level. And I accomplished my goal of turning an unknown into a master chef. And that has to be the perfect way to close Hell's Kitchen tonight. And I'm fucking out of here!"
