= The Promenade at Coconut Creek =

- Location: Coconut Creek, Florida, United States
- Coordinates: 26.2838°N 80.1878°W
- Address: 4443 Lyons Road
- Opened: November 1, 2008
- Developer: Stanbery Development
- Owner: Stanbery Development
- Num. of stores: 55
- Num. of anchor tenants: 1
- Floor area: 250,000 sq ft (23,000 m^{2})
- Floors: 1
- Parking: Yes
- Website: thepromenadeatcoconutcreek.com

The Promenade at Coconut Creek is a 23-acre (93,000 m^{2}) open-air upscale shopping center in Coconut Creek, Florida, United States, a suburban city in Broward County. This LEED pre-certified development opened in November 2008.

Notably, a 75,000-square-foot (7,000 m^{2}) Class A office building exists on the site with tenants that include Allstate Insurance, which occupies 33,810 square feet (3,141 m^{2}) of the building. In addition to numerous available parking spaces, the center also has two parking garages, one two stories tall, whereas the other has three. The center also offers one EV charger.
