= Atlantic Technical College =

Coordinates: 26.24454°N 80.194659°W

Atlantic Technical College and Technical High School

Location
- 4700 Coconut Creek Parkway; Coconut Creek, Florida; United States

Information
- Type: Public, secondary, post-secondary
- School district: Broward County Public Schools
- Superintendent: Dr. Peter B. Licata
- Principal: Neeta E. Rancourt
- Grades: 9–adult
- Enrollment: 678 (2021-22)
- Campus: Suburban
- Website: atlantictechnicalcollege.edu

Atlantic Technical College, located in Coconut Creek, Broward County, Florida, United States, is a public, secondary and post-secondary institution.

== History ==
The school was built in 1973, then known as Atlantic Vocational Center, serving vocational education to 450 adult students with 11 programs of instruction. Years later, more construction phases were made to keep pace with more programs being added, community growth, and labor market demands.

More than 8,000 students attend classes offered during the day, night, and Saturday mornings.

In August 2002, Atlantic Technical College added its own magnet high school, starting with a class of 150 students. Another 150 students were added each year, riding to a total of 600 students. The first class to graduate was in 2006.

In 2010, the school was awarded a silver medal by U.S. News & World Report for "America's Best High Schools" for three consecutive years.

In 2014, the School Board of Broward County, Florida officially changed the school's name to Atlantic Technical College.

== Occupational programs ==
Atlantic Technical College offers seven types of occupational programs, including: Automotive & Transportation Technology, Business Management and Administration, Health Sciences, Hospitality and Tourism, Information Technology, and Manufacturing.

== High school demographics ==
As of the 2021–22 school year, the total student enrollment was 678. The ethnic makeup of the school was 37.2% White, 52.7% Black, 26.7% Hispanic, 3.7% Asian, 0.6% Pacific Islander, 4.7% multiracial, and 1.2% Native American or Native Alaskan. Note that the adult enrollment in this school is not reflected in the total student enrollment number.
