= Gregory Tony =

American sheriff (born 1978)

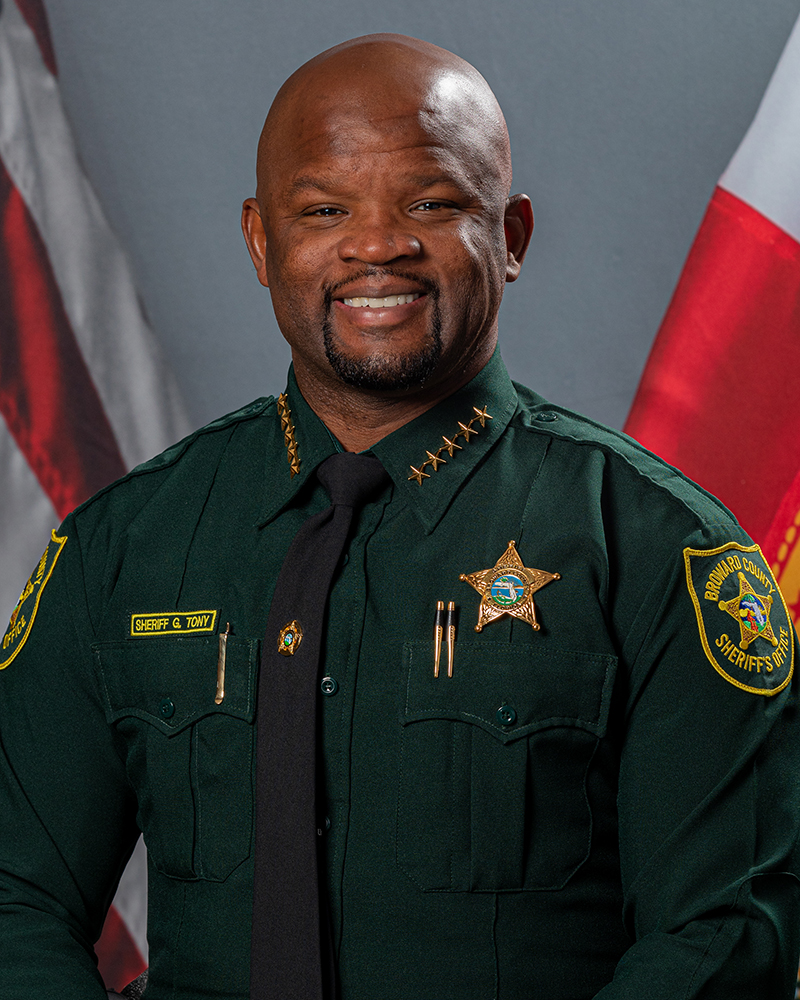

17th Sheriff of Broward County
- Incumbent
- Assumed office January 11, 2019
- Appointed by: Ron DeSantis
- Preceded by: Scott Israel

Personal details
- Born: 1978 (age 47–48) Philadelphia, Pennsylvania, U.S.
- Party: Democratic
- Spouse: Holly Tony
- Education: Tallahassee Community College; Florida State University (BS); Nova Southeastern University (MS); (PhD)
- Occupation: Law enforcement officer

Gregory Scott Tony (born 1978) is an American law enforcement officer and serving since 2019 as the 17th Sheriff of Broward County, Florida.

Tony was initially appointed sheriff in 2019 by Florida governor Ron DeSantis, to fill a vacancy. In November 2020, Tony won election to the office of sheriff, which he had previously held by appointment.

== Early life and education ==
Tony was born and raised in Philadelphia, Pennsylvania, the youngest of five children of Gloria Tony and William Scott. He attended Olney High School in Philadelphia, graduating in 1997.

Tony moved to Tallahassee, Florida, and attended Tallahassee Community College. He then attended Florida State University in Tallahassee, where he played football under Bobby Bowden. He graduated with a bachelor's degree in criminology in 2002. He later obtained a master's degree in criminal justice from Nova Southeastern University in Fort Lauderdale, Florida. In 2024, Tony was awarded a doctor of philosophy degree in criminal justice from Nova Southeastern University.

== Early career (2005-18) ==
He was first employed as a police officer by the suburban Coral Springs Police Department from 2005, when he was 26 years old, to 2016, ultimately becoming a sergeant. Tony's resume indicates that for years he has also served as an adjunct professor.

Tony started an active shooter training company, Blue Spear Solutions, with his wife in 2015. From 2016 through 2017, Tony worked as Director of Community Development at North American Rescue, a South Carolina company that sold bleeding-control kits and stations.

== Sheriff of Broward County (2019–present) ==
=== Appointment ===
While running for Governor of Florida, Ron DeSantis made a campaign promise to replace Broward Sheriff Scott Israel. Press reported that Tony was one of three possibilities for the position, along with former sheriff Al Lamberti and county judge John Fry.

According to the Sun Sentinel, newly elected governor DeSantis's vetting of Tony was "rushed." The governor's office requested that a background check be performed on Tony one day before DeSantis appointed Tony to the position.

On January 11, 2019, days after Florida governor DeSantis took office, DeSantis suspended the prior sheriff for allegedly mishandling the Fort Lauderdale airport shooting and the Stoneman Douglas High School shooting. DeSantis at the same time appointed Tony the Sheriff of Broward County, Florida. DeSantis appointed Tony largely on the recommendation of a parent of a Stoneman Douglas High School shooting victim, who had met and worked out with Tony in a gym. The Miami Herald called Tony "an unlikely choice."

=== Union vote of no confidence, and call for Tony's removal ===
In April 2020, four days after a 39-year-old Broward Sheriff's Office deputy died from COVID-19 during the COVID-19 pandemic in Florida, and after 20 other deputies tested positive for the virus, President Jeff Bell of the Broward Sheriff's Office Deputies Association – a 1,400-member branch of the International Union of Police Associations – criticized Tony over the lack of personal protective equipment for the officers, and Tony's failure to respond to their memos about the situation. Tony said Bell's actions were "dishonorable." Three days later, Tony suspended the union president without pay, and placed him under administrative investigation. Tony then terminated the union president in January 2022.

The union announced a vote of no-confidence by its officers in Tony. On June 3, 2020, the union wrote governor DeSantis to formally request that Tony be removed. The governor did not take any action.

=== 2020 election ===
Tony first ran against Scott Israel (whom he defeated with 37% of the vote, to 35% for Israel) and several lesser-known candidates in the August 2020 Broward County Democratic primary election. As of May, Tony had raised $1.1 million, to $0.1 million raised by Israel. In the November general election, Tony then won against Republican H. Wayne Clark and independent Charles "Chuck" Whatley, with 63% of the vote in the overwhelmingly Democratic county.

==== Discovery of 1993 killing by Tony ====
During the 2020 election campaign, the Florida Bulldog reported that Tony had shot and killed his neighbor when he was 14 years old and living in Philadelphia. Tony was arrested for murder and weapons offenses and initially charged and ordered to stand trial as an adult and held without bail pending a preliminary hearing. The case was then transferred to juvenile court. There, he was found not guilty after he maintained that the shooting was in self-defense; the family of the deceased disputed that assertion, witnesses who said they had seen the killing and that the deceased had not been armed nor was it a case of self defense were not called. The court records relating to the killing are sealed.

Tony did not disclose the killing when he applied for law enforcement jobs. When asked about the shooting, Tony denied he had been arrested, asserting that he simply went to the police station to provide a statement and was allowed to leave with his father.

DeSantis did not know about Tony's killing prior to appointing Tony, and it did not come up in a background check of Tony during vetting. When DeSantis found out about Tony's killing in May 2020, he distanced himself from Tony, but said that the shooting had not come up in the background check because it was self-defense and would not have made a difference. DeSantis added that he would leave the matter for Broward voters to decide.

=== 2024 election ===
Tony was re-elected to a second full term in 2024.

== Investigations of Tony ==
Due to a complaint about whether Gregory made misstatements about his past on law enforcement documents, the Florida Department of Law Enforcement (FDLE) began an investigation in May 2020. In January 2022, they released a report that alleged that Tony failed to disclose his arrest for the 1993 killing, his driver license suspension, his LSD use, and a charge against him for passing a bad check. Tony could not be charged criminally because the relevant statute of limitations had expired and FDLE referred its report to the Florida Ethics Commission for its consideration.

In June 2022, another FDLE investigation found that Tony had in February 2019 provided false information on his Florida driver's license application by not disclosing a previous license suspension in Pennsylvania. The Fort Myers state attorney's office did not pursue charges because the driver's license office clerk could not remember the incident with certainty. A three-member Florida Criminal Justice Standards & Training Commission panel recommended that a disciplinary process be initiated, and that Tony be barred from being a law enforcement officer in Florida. In July 2022, Tony filed a request for an administrative hearing to dispute his police license being revoked. In May 2024, the administrative judge issued an order recommending that Tony receive a written reprimand, be required to complete ethics training, and be put on 18-month probation. In February 2025, the commission voted to issue a written reprimand, a lesser punishment than what the judge had recommended.

In early September 2022, the Florida Commission on Ethics, at a hearing arising from the FDLE referral, found probable cause that Tony misused his public position when he provided false information or did not disclose information which benefited him in getting his jobs. As a result of the ethics commission's statement, Tony was added by Broward state prosecutors to its list of law enforcement officials who could be perceived as having credibility issues that might render their testimony in a trial less than credible. In December 2022, the Florida Commission on Ethics, at a hearing arising from a separate citizen complaint, again found probable cause to believe that Tony misused his public position during the appointment process for the Broward County Sheriff position. In March 2025, the commission reached a settlement with Tony for him to receive a public censure and reprimand from DeSantis. Broward prosecutors also removed Tony from its list of witnesses who have credibility issues.
