= Scott Israel =

American law enforcement officer

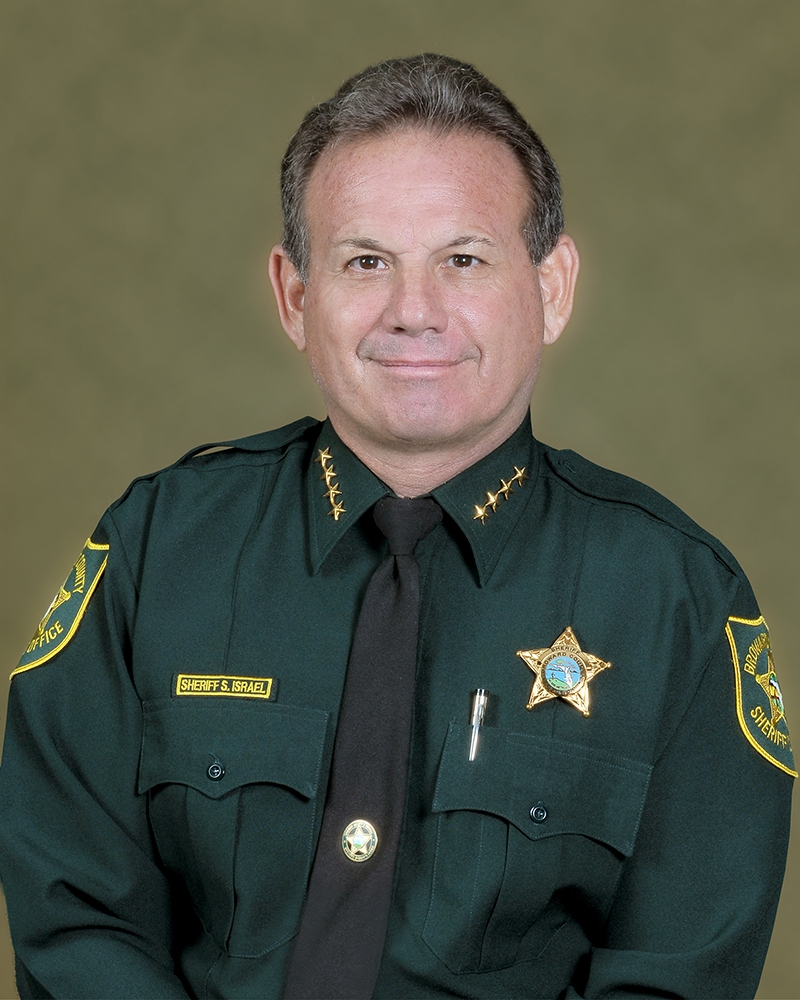
- Israel in 2013

Police Chief of Opa-locka, Florida
- In office 2022–2023

16th Sheriff of Broward County
- In office January 8, 2013 – January 11, 2019
- Preceded by: Al Lamberti
- Succeeded by: Gregory Tony

Personal details
- Born: 1956 or 1957 (age 69–70) New York, US
- Party: Democratic
- Spouse: Susan Israel
- Children: 3
- Education: SUNY Cortland; FBI National Academy
- Occupation: Law enforcement officer

Scott Israel (born 1956 or 1957) is an American law enforcement officer in Florida, and the former Broward County Sheriff.

Israel was chief of police in North Bay Village, Florida, from 2004 to 2008, during which time he was named Police Chief of the Year in Miami Dade County. He later served as the 16th sheriff of the 6,000-member Sheriff's Office in Broward County, Florida, from 2013 until 2019. In 2016, Broward County voters re-elected Israel as Sheriff with 72% of the vote - the largest electoral win for a Broward County Sheriff in 80 years.

He has been outspoken regarding gun violence and gun control, and opposed open carry legislation. Israel called for a ban on assault rifles to be reinstated, and said that he does not believe that people with mental illness should have access to firearms. His views made him a target of conservatives across the nation, in part due to his criticism of the National Rifle Association, and what he considers to be lax gun laws.

The Parkland high school shooting occurred in his jurisdiction in February 2018 while he was Broward County Sheriff, and his department and deputies were criticized. Newly elected Florida governor Ron DeSantis suspended him three days after taking office 11 months later. Israel appealed to the Florida Senate, which appointed J. Dudley Goodlette (R), a former member of the Florida House of Representatives, to serve as Special Master and hear testimony and evidence with regard to the propriety of the suspension. After Goodlette conducted a trial, he issued his report in September 2019, finding that Israel's removal by the governor had been improper, and recommending that Israel be reinstated. Nevertheless, in October 2019, the Florida Senate voted to confirm Israel's suspension.

== Early and personal life ==
Israel was born in New York, raised in the Bronx and in Baldwin, Long Island, and is Jewish. His father Maurice "Sonny" Israel (May 31, 1928 – June 1, 2006) fought in the Korean War as a US Marines sergeant (1950–1954), and was a New York City homicide detective and a Palm Beach Sheriff's Office deputy with a combined 44 years of service.

Scott Israel attended Baldwin High School. He earned his bachelor's degree in political science and government at SUNY Cortland ('77), and played quarterback in college football there. He then took a course of study at the FBI National Academy.

His wife Susan is Christian, and they raised their triplets (Brett, Blake, and Blair) with extensive exposure to both faiths. The triplets were all bar/bat mitzvahed, and when they became adults he said: "they each have the free choice to decide their own faith." In school, Brett was a starting quarterback for Marjory Stoneman Douglas High School, Blake was a midfielder for the lacrosse team and a safety for the football team, and Blair was a sprinter on the track team.

== Career ==
=== Fort Lauderdale Police Department (1979-2004) ===
He became a patrol officer for the Fort Lauderdale Police Department in 1979. Israel later worked undercover in narcotics, and served as a SWAT team commander, before retiring from the department as a captain in 2004. In the 1980s he was investigated for ten incidents by the department’s Internal Affairs division. None of the complaints were sustained, however, and the department eventually destroyed the old files. During his career with the department, he received 59 letters of commendation.

=== North Bay Village Chief of Police (2004-2008) ===
From 2004 to 2008, Israel was the chief of police in North Bay Village, Florida. He was named Police Chief of the Year in Miami Dade County. Israel resigned that position in 2008 to run for Sheriff as the Democratic nominee, but narrowly lost the general election to the incumbent Republican sheriff whose campaign outspent his by approximately $200,000.

=== Broward County Sheriff (2013-2019) ===
==== First term ====
Israel, running as a Democrat, was elected Broward County Sheriff in 2012, defeating incumbent Sheriff Al Lamberti (R) by a 53% to 47% vote. In the campaign, Lamberti outspent Israel by approximately $460,000. Israel was the first Jewish sheriff in Broward County history, and the second in Florida's history. The department has 6,000 members, and the county had nearly two million residents.

In May 2015, Israel said that he was concerned with the nationwide increase in shootings of unarmed men, and that he had told his deputies that if any of them shot an unarmed suspect, they would have to answer to him.

That same year, Israel began to implement a plan for all 1,500 uniformed deputies to wear body cameras, a program which was fully implemented by the end of 2016. During Israel's tenure as Sheriff, burglaries dropped 42% in BSO-patrolled areas (from 5,556 to 3,210), and violent crime dropped nearly 20% (from 23,983 incidents to 19,564). He also increased diversity among BSO personnel, increasing the percentage of Asian, Hispanic, and African-American deputies; and stressed the concept of community policing. Israel also expanded the use of juvenile civil citations (instead of criminal arrests), making their issuance mandatory to all eligible youth, in order to help keep juveniles out of the criminal justice system and give them second chances.

He is known for being outspoken regarding gun violence and gun control, and opposed open carry legislation. During his first term, Israel built a record of being the most progressive sheriff in Florida with his approach to body cameras and civil citations for juveniles.

==== Second term ====
In 2016, Broward County voters re-elected Israel as Sheriff with 72% of the vote - the largest electoral win for a Broward County Sheriff in 80 years.

At the same time, Israel was a target of conservatives across the nation and the National Rifle Association (NRA), in part due to his vocal criticism of the NRA and what he considered lax gun laws. During a CNN town hall in February 2018, he told an NRA spokeswoman that the NRA was obstructing the police’s ability to keep people safe.

==== Fort Lauderdale airport shooting ====
In the January 2017 Fort Lauderdale airport shooting, a mentally ill shooter flew to Florida from Alaska and using a legally purchased Walther PPS 9mm semi-automatic pistol, legally checked in his luggage, without warning opened fire in the airport. He killed five people and injured six others.

A Broward County Sheriff's Office deputy in the terminal immediately responded by running to the sound of gunfire, apprehending the suspect within 85 seconds after it began. The following year, he was named Deputy of the Year by the Florida Sheriffs Association. The deputy had been trained to react immediately to an active shooter, and said: "I was basically going, reacting, what I was trained to do. So I went towards the shooting." The other responding BSO officers also reacted in a manner that the Special Master who was appointed to review the law enforcement response, former Florida Senate President J. Dudley Goodlette, later said was "textbook." The Special Master found that the shooting "was not preventable by Sheriff Israel or anyone else".

The BSO's after-action report did not find any negligence on the part of Israel. It did, however, criticize the agency for failing to take control due to leadership issues from the incident commander (a colonel) on the scene, and problems with Broward County's failing radio communications system which was controlled by the county rather than the sheriff's office, which was one of its many users.

The Senate's Special Master J. Dudley Goodlette, who examined all the evidence of the incident in a two-day evidentiary hearing, said no evidence supported the notion that the shooting and later chaos could have been avoided with better BSO training and preparation.

After the shooting, Israel called for a ban on assault rifles to be reinstated, and said that he didn't believe that people with mental illness should have access to firearms. He said: "All I'm going to do is speak my mind. If I'm on an island, I'm on an island. I'm not going to worry about who is with me or who is not."

==== Parkland high school shooting ====
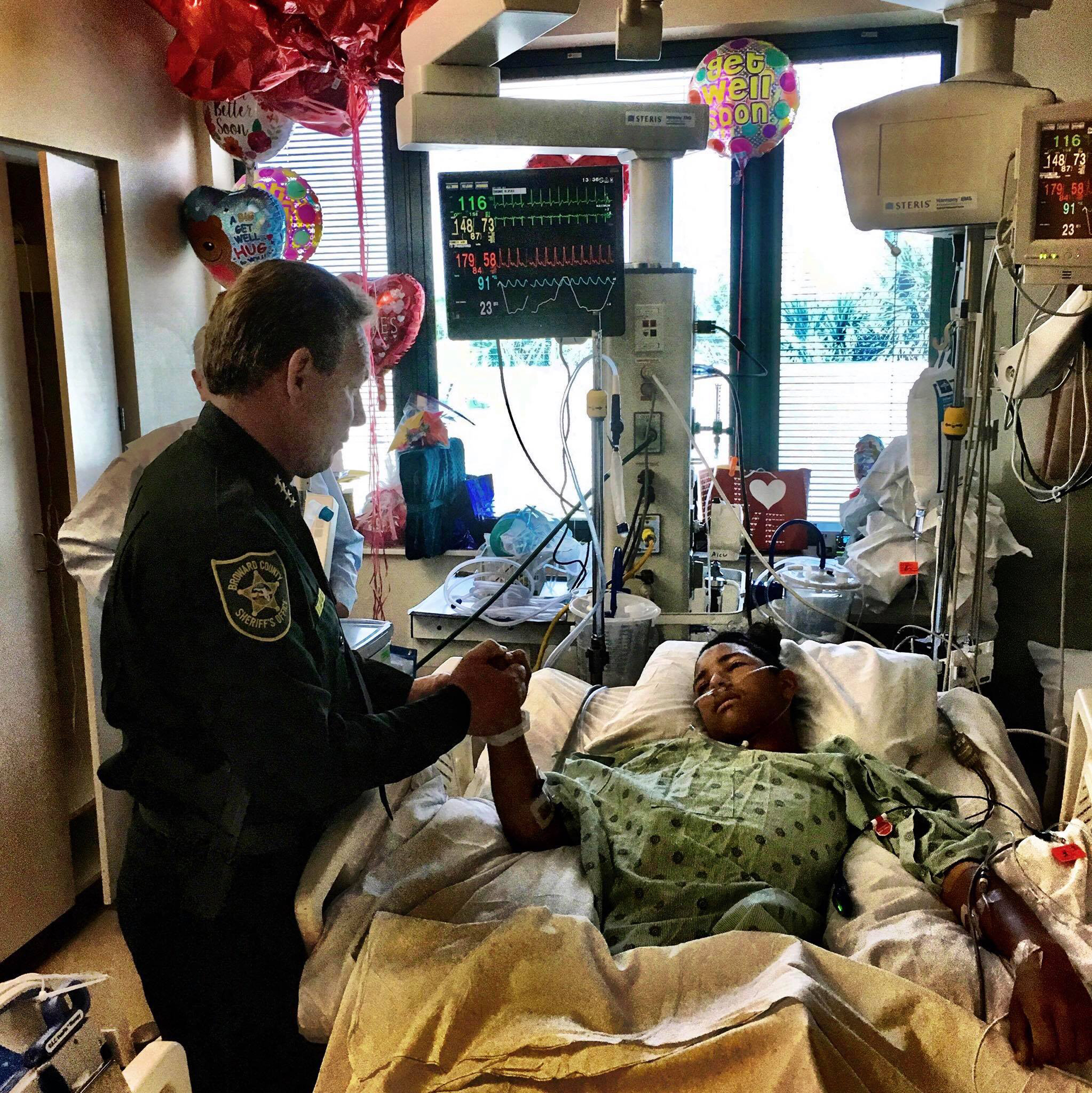
Sheriff Israel visits victim Anthony Borges.

On February 14, 2018, a 19-year-old shooter, armed with a semi-automatic AR-15 style rifle that he had purchased legally, entered Marjory Stoneman Douglas High School in Parkland, Florida and opened fire on students and staff. He murdered 17 people, and injured 17 others, shooting 140 rounds in less than six minutes. In the aftermath of the shooting, Sheriff Israel came under scrutiny for both the actions of his deputies and what was seen by some as his department's failure to act sufficiently in reaction to warning signs about shooter and former student Nikolas Cruz.

During the shooting, a 32-year veteran armed sheriff's deputy (Scot Peterson) arrived at the school within two minutes of the start of the shooting, but did not enter the building or peer in its windows, and instead retreated to another building and hid for 48 minutes, while telling other deputies to stay at least 500 feet (150 m) from the building. Afterward Israel criticized the deputy, saying that he should have "went in, addressed the killer, killed the killer". It was later discovered that there may have been at least two other deputies, who arrived later, who also did not enter the building. Coral Springs police officers who arrived at the scene were surprised to find that the deputies still had not entered the building. A Florida sheriff on the panel said that several of the Broward deputies on the scene failed to take command, and seemed disengaged or were distracted or failed to act at all, driving back and forth outside the school during the shooting. This led to disciplinary action against additional deputies. As to Israel, the Special Master tasked with reviewing his suspension, who recommended that the suspension was inappropriate, found "Sheriff Israel does not (and cannot) supervise each deputy." The Special Master noted that the BSO had 5,600 budgeted positions.

Israel said his agency had received 23 calls involving the killer in some way over the prior several years, as well as calls relating to his brother. With regard to some of the calls, handled both in person and by phone, deputies met with Cruz’s mother. The Broward Sheriff Office stated on February 24, 2018: "Since 2008, BSO responded to 23 incidents where previous contact was made with the killer or his family." Through a public records request, CNN found that the sheriff's department had received 19 calls relating to Cruz himself (some when Cruz was as young as nine years old; they ranged from a call to the police reporting that Cruz was cursing, to a call saying he had shot a chicken with a BB gun). A total of 45 calls related to the Cruz home, Cruz or his brother (his brother was the subject of the majority of the calls), over the prior decade. The majority of the calls resulted in no written report.

A Marjory Stoneman Douglas High School resource deputy had an investigator for the Florida Department of Children and Families speak to Cruz in 2016, but Cruz's therapist said that he was “not currently a threat to himself or others” and did not need to be committed—a mental health counselor said Cruz did not meet the criteria under Florida law that allows the police to commit a mentally ill person against their will. Stoneman Douglas High School conducted a “threat assessment” on Cruz after the counselor’s report, and the Florida Department of Children and Families ultimately concluded that Cruz was not a threat given that he was living with his mother, attending school, and seeing a counselor. The FBI admitted that it had received a tip (saying the caller suspected Cruz would shoot up a school) that its protocols required it to further investigate, but that it had failed to do so.

Sheriff Israel rejected calls for his resignation, including one from Republican state representative Bill Hager, as to which Israel said "It was a shameful, politically motivated letter that had no facts." Speaking to reporters after the shooting, Israel said: "I've said this time and time again. While the people who are victims of mental health illnesses in this country are being treated, in the opinion of this sheriff, they should not be able to buy, surround themselves with, purchase, or carry a handgun. Those two things don't mix." Israel called on federal and state lawmakers to allow police officers to detain people for a mental health evaluation who had made worrisome social media posts or “graphic threats” such as wanting to be a serial killer. He also said: "Bump stocks should be outlawed forever."

On November 12, 2018, at the high school's Public Safety Commission's monthly meeting investigating the shooting, Israel admitted that he had changed the sheriff's policy on active shooters, changing one word in a critical sentence about deputies engaging active shooters from "shall" go in after the shooter, to "may" go in after the shooter. The change brought the policy in line with most similar policies at other Florida law enforcement agencies, while other policies even required that the deputy not go in after the shooter but rather wait for backup. Polk County Sheriff Grady Judd, a commissioner on the panel, admonished Israel, saying "Words matter, and according to your policy, he did not have to go in". Judd was referring to Scot Peterson, the former BSO deputy assigned to the high school as a school resource officer, who resigned after it was revealed that he had not entered the building to engage the shooter, but rather had waited outside the building with his gun drawn while shots were being fired inside. A Marjory Stoneman Douglas Commission found that Peterson "knew through his training that the appropriate response was to seek out the active shooter, and not containment." Israel's statement that he had changed the verbiage of the active shooter policy was at odds with his statements at a news conference nine months earlier, days after the shooting, when he announced that Peterson was being suspended without pay because "He never went in."

A 2019 "Marjory Stoneman Douglas High School Public Safety Commission Report" did not find any neglect of duty or incompetence on the part of Israel, but did discuss Peterson's failure to confront the shooter, and find that equipment and training necessary for effective response to mass casualty events was sporadic and inconsistent. The Special Master review concluded: "it was the individual failures that plagued the Stoneman Douglas response, not neglect or incompetence by Sheriff Israel.

==== Union issues over raises ====
On April 20, 2018, the Broward Sheriff's Office Deputies Association—an IUPA labor union local—held a no-confidence vote, after it failed to reach a new labor contract and win the raises its members were seeking. It was the first no-confidence vote the union had brought against a sheriff, and was 534 – 94 against Israel. Two other unions in contrast wrote letters in support of Israel, the Fraternal Order of Police Lodge #53, and The Federation of Public Employees which said it represented 2,500 BSO employees and which wrote: "As your largest union, we support you and have confidence in how you are running this large complex agency."

==== Suspension and fallout ====
On January 11, 2019, Florida Governor Ron DeSantis, who had as a candidate for governor twice said that he would have suspended Israel were he governor, followed up on his campaign promise three days after being sworn into office, ousting Israel and replacing him with former Coral Springs police Sgt. Gregory Tony. Israel said "There was no wrongdoing on my part."

In response to Israel's ouster, five command staff resigned, including Col. John "Jack" Dale, whose recorded reason was "Actions by governor not in the best interest of public safety", Undersheriff Steve Kinsey, the second in command at the agency ("due to the sheriff being suspended unjustly"), and Major Chadwick Wagner, a former Hollywood, Florida police chief ("the unjust decision by Gov. Ron DeSantis to remove Broward County Sheriff Scott J. Israel"). Broward Sheriff's Sgt. Anthony Marciano, president of the Federation of Public Employees union, representing deputies, said Israel unnecessarily "poked a big bear that he didn't need to poke" when he addressed the NRA, but that Israel's fate would have better been left to voters. He opined: "the sheriff said one thing that should have resonated with everybody: 'You can't teach courage to people.'"

==== Appeal ====
Israel appealed his removal to the Florida Senate. The Senate appointed former Senate President J. Dudley Goodlette (R) to serve as Special Master to hear the testimony and evidence on the appeal. Because the Senate was controlled by Republicans, and Israel was a Democrat, his appeal was considered a long shot.

In March 2019, DeSantis in his first State of the State speech to a joint session of the Florida Legislature said “Why any senator would want to thumb his nose at the Parkland families and to eject Sheriff Tony, who is doing a great job and has made history as the first African-American sheriff in Broward history, is beyond me.”

After conducting a trial regarding the matter, Goodlette issued his report in September 2019. He found that the removal of Israel by the governor had been improper, and recommended that Israel be reinstated. Bob Gualtieri, chairman of the panel investigating the Parkland shooting and sheriff of Pinellas County, said he didn't think Israel should be suspended: "He had some personnel that failed. Any law enforcement organization is going to have people that fail. And just because individuals fail doesn't mean that the leader of the organization is a failure."

However, despite the report by the Special Master whom they had appointed—and the Special Master's recommendation that Israel be reinstated—the Florida Senate held a special session on October 23, 2019, at which it voted 25 –15 to uphold the suspension, with the vote largely along party lines. All five Florida state senators from Broward voted to reinstate Israel.

==== 2020 campaign ====
Israel and Tony were the leading contenders in a field of six candidates for the sheriff position in the 2020 Democratic Party primary. Israel raised $600,000 for his campaign, while Tony raised $1.5 million for the primary. The South Florida Sun Sentinel endorsed Israel in the primary. Tony defeated Israel by a 37% to 35% vote in the primary, with four other candidates splitting the remainder of the vote. The IUPA deputies' union endorsed a third candidate in the primary race, retired BSO Colonel Al Pollock, who finished third place with 11%.

Following his 2020 defeat, Israel briefly worked at the Davie Police Department in 2020 – 2021, overseeing the review of red light camera violations.

=== Opa-locka Police Chief (2022-2023) ===
In June 2022, Israel became the Police Chief of Opa-Locka, Florida, in Miami-Dade County. One year later, in June 2023, he announced his resignation from the position, saying that he was not permanently retiring and would look for new opportunities.
