= Roxcy Bolton =

American feminist and civil rights activist

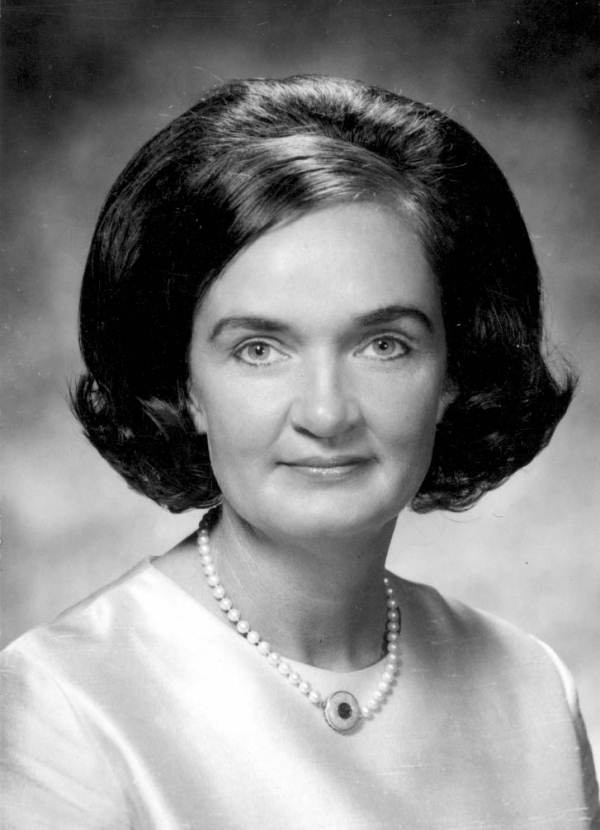
- Born: Roxcy O'Neal; June 3, 1926; Duck Hill, Mississippi, U.S.
- Died: May 17, 2017 (aged 90); Coral Gables, Florida, U.S.
- Occupations: Activist, feminist
- Known for: Founder of Women in Distress
- Spouse: David Bolton (m. 1960)
- Children: 4
- Awards: Florida Women's Hall of Fame (1984)

Roxcy Pearl O'Neal Bolton (June 3, 1926 – May 17, 2017) was an American feminist and civil rights activist.

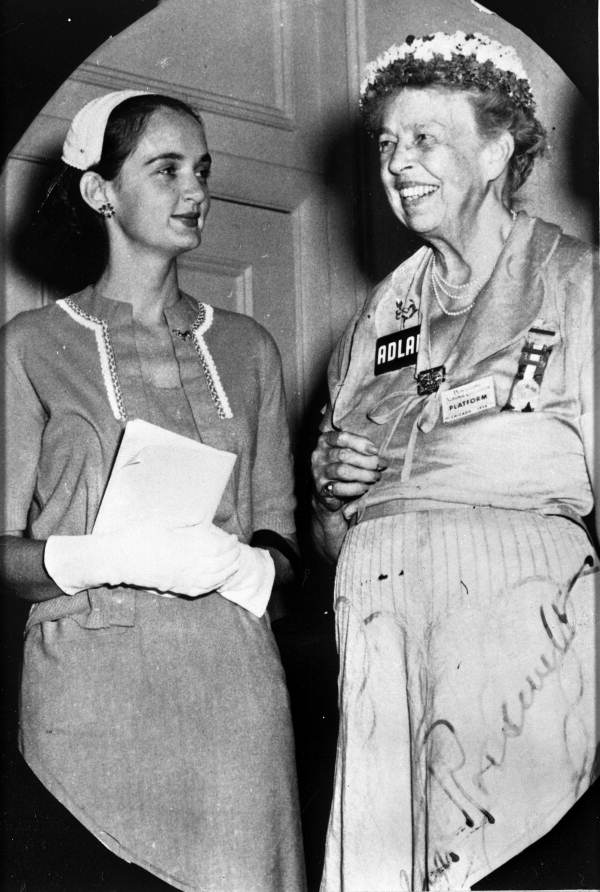
Roxcy Bolton with Eleanor Roosevelt after Roosevelts address at the Democratic National Convention in 1956.

== Personal life ==
Bolton was born on June 3, 1926, in Duck Hill, Mississippi, a small town of several hundred. At a young age, she had ambitions to be a Member of Congress. When she was 10, she witnessed the lynching of two black men, which was also witnessed by her whole town. Growing up Bolton was a member of the Daughters of the Confederacy.

Bolton graduated from high school and moved to Miami. She married William Charles Hart, a Coast Guardsman at the time. They had a son, Randall, who died in 2000. They divorced after five years together. When first settling in Miami, Bolton worked an office job and joined the Young Democrats.

In 1960, she married Commander David Bolton, USN, who later acted as president of Men for ERA. For a time, they lived in Japan and South Carolina, but by 1964 they had settled in Coral Gables, FL. They had three children together, Bonnie Dee Bolton, David Bolton Jr., and Baron "Buddy" Bolton.

Bolton was a dedicated Democrat for all of her adult life.

== Career in activism ==
Bolton dedicated her life to activism. While she preferred civil conversation, when it failed she was willing to be confrontational.

Bolton became civically active in the 1950s. She was greatly influenced by Eleanor Roosevelt after hearing her address to the Democratic National Convention of 1956.

In 1966, Bolton helped form Florida's National Organization for Women, serving as charter president of the Miami Chapter and National Vice President in 1969. Also in 1969, she successfully challenged the practice that many store restaurants had of keeping a separate "men only" section. In 1972, she founded Women in Distress, a shelter for battered and homeless women. In the same year, she led six women to take over the office of the University of Miami president to demand promotion of more women to department-head positions, pay equality, and more.

Also in 1972, she encouraged President Nixon to issue a proclamation honoring Women's Equality Day, which he did. His proclamation was presented to her in recognition of her encouragement. Bolton was an active supporter of the Equal Rights Amendment and persuaded Senator Birch Bayh to introduce the Amendment to Congress.

Bolton led the effort to create the Women’s Park in Miami, which opened in 1992 as the first outdoor space in America honoring past and present women leaders. Bolton suffered a stroke in 1998 that slowed down her activism.

In 1994, Bolton donated her personal papers and photos to the State Archives of Florida. A collection of her artifacts are also owned by the Museum of Florida History. Her Coral Gables home was dedicated as a Florida Heritage Site in 1999. In 2014, the National Women's History Project celebrated Bolton as a National Women's History Month Honoree.

Bolton is also credited with the opening of the influential and political Tiger Bay Club to women. In another pioneering effort, Bolton initiated the Rehabilitation Program for Young Prostitutes in the Miami-Dade County. The program offered educational opportunities to incarcerated prostitutes and attempted to keep the women off the streets and out of drugs. Bolton also persuaded National Airlines to grant maternity leave to pregnant flight attendants rather than firing them.

In her career as an activist, she fought for a variety of issues including: anti-rape, renaming hurricanes, equal pay, public breastfeeding, access to military academies for women, ending sexist advertising, maternity leave, ending segregation, and better refugee treatment.

=== Anti-rape activism ===
In 1971, Bolton lead the nation's first "march against rape." She gathered 100 businesswomen, political leaders, activists, housewives and a few men and led them through downtown Miami to the courthouse.

In 1974, she founded the nation's first Rape Treatment Center at Jackson Memorial Hospital in Miami, later renamed the Roxcy Bolton Rape Treatment Center in 1993. The center served as the prototype for many centers that followed its establishment. That same year she organized Florida's first Crime Watch meeting to help stem crime against women. She was also instrumental in bringing several rape cases to the attention of the public, despite police concerns. She elevated the prevention and treatment of rape into priorities for law enforcement and health professionals.

She was inducted into the Florida Women's Hall of Fame in 1984 for "forcing police and prosecutors to make rape crime a priority".

=== Hurricane renaming ===
She challenged N.O.A.A (National Oceanic and Atmospheric Administration) to change the names of hurricanes to include the names of men. Government forecasters had adopted the old naval tradition in 1953. Twenty-six years after its adaptation and ten years after presenting her issue, weathermen finally eliminated the practice with the second hurricane of 1979 being named Bob.

== Controversy ==
In 1976, Bolton left NOW due to their creation of a lesbian caucus. She held to the idea that the organization and its members held "responsibilities to family and children."

== Death ==
Bolton died on the morning of May 17, 2017 at Doctor's Hospital in Coral Gables, Florida at the age of 90.
