= Broward County Sheriff's Office =

Law enforcement agency in Florida, US

Coordinates: 26.1220°N 80.1776°W

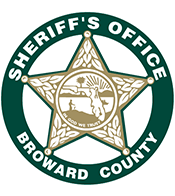
- Abbreviation: BSO

Agency overview
- Formed: 1915; 111 years ago
- Employees: 5,400
- Annual budget: $730 million

Jurisdictional structure
- Operations jurisdiction: Florida, U.S.
- Legal jurisdiction: Unincorporated areas of Broward County, Florida, and 15 local municipalities through contract services.
- General nature: Local civilian police

Operational structure
- Headquarters: 2601 W. Broward Blvd., Fort Lauderdale, Florida
- Agency executive: Gregory Tony, Sheriff

Website
- www.sheriff.org

Broward Sheriff Fire Rescue
Agency overview
- Fire chief: Timothy Keefe

The Broward County Sheriff's Office (BSO) is one of the nation's largest full-service public safety agencies with over 5,400 employees, including nearly 3,400 sworn law enforcement officers, detention deputies, and fire rescue personnel. Sheriff Gregory Tony heads the agency.

BSO was one of the United States' largest fully-accredited sheriff's offices before losing accreditation (by unanimous vote) in 2019.

== Structure and roles ==
The Broward County Sheriff's Office (BSO) is responsible for law enforcement and civil protection in Broward County. The BSO also oversees the fire department and emergency medical services for Broward County.

The BSO's Department of Law Enforcement covers areas including the Broward County Courthouse, the Ft. Lauderdale-Hollywood International Airport, areas of the Everglades and the county's waterways, unincorporated Broward, and 13 cities and towns that contracted for BSO law enforcement services.

It also administers the Marine and Dive Rescue Unit, Motorcycle Unit, and Crime Lab. BSO also provides 9-1-1 intake, but the county's agreement with it to provide that service expired at the end of 2022.

== History ==
The BSO was founded in 1915 with the county, taking over law enforcement operations formerly divided between Palm Beach and Dade counties. In 2003, the BSO took control of Broward County Fire Rescue, Port Everglades Fire Rescue, and the Ft. Lauderdale/ Hollywood International Airport Fire Rescue departments.

From 1988 to 1990, the BSO manufactured its own crack cocaine in order to sell it in sting operations and arrest buyers. Up to 2,600 people were convicted and sometimes given longer sentences because BSO sold the drugs near schools, before the Florida Supreme Court ruled in 1993 that "law enforcement officers' conduct in illegally manufacturing crack cocaine is so outrageous that it violates the due process clause." In 2024 the Broward County State Attorney's Office motioned to vacate the convictions. The process continues in 2026, including the office attempting clearing the records of suspects posthumously.

=== Parkland high school shooting ===
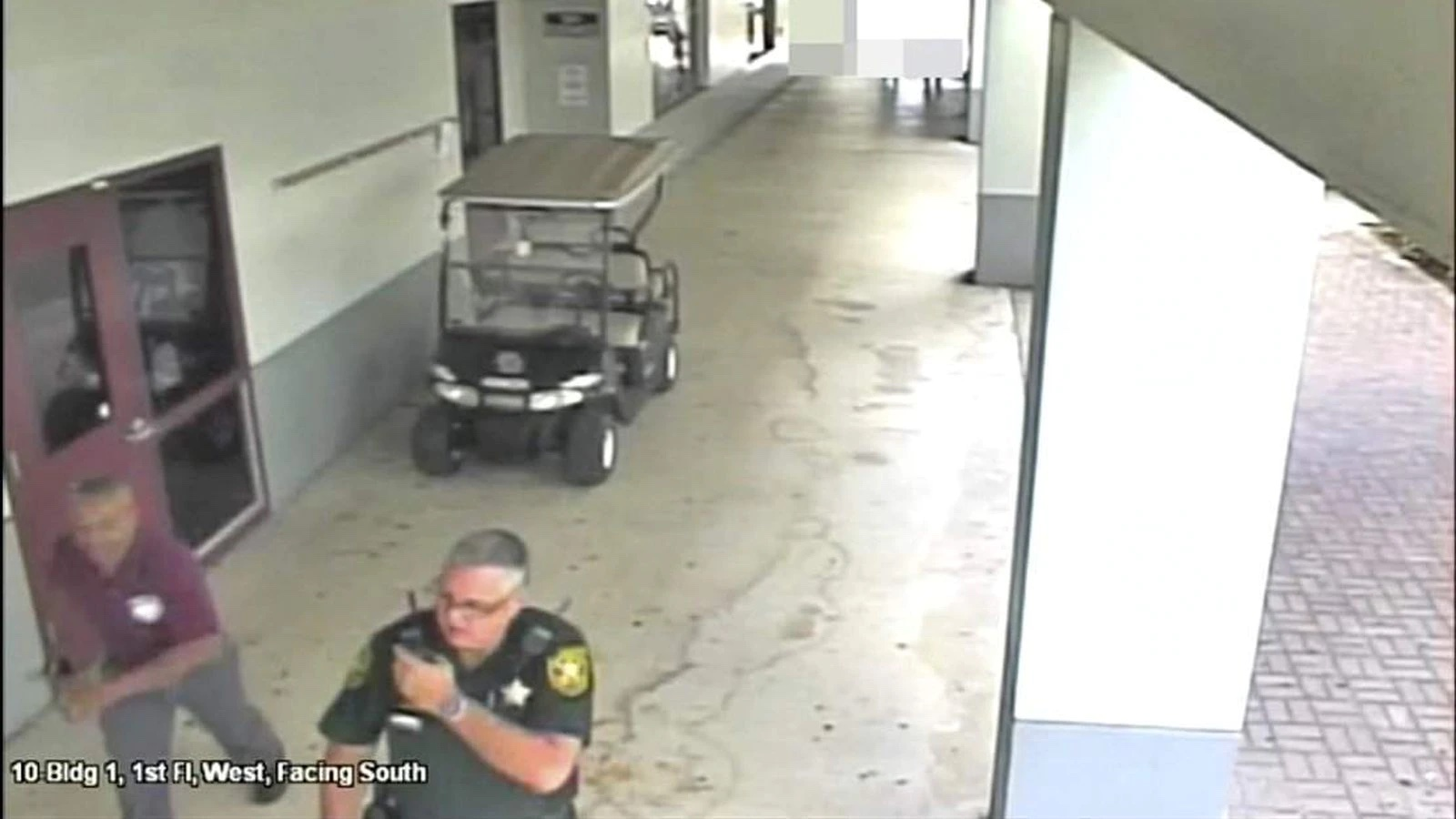
BCSO deputy Scot Peterson outside high school building, during shootings inside Marjory Stoneman Douglas High School

Following a deadly mass shooting at Marjory Stoneman Douglas High School in February 2018, the Broward County Sheriff's Office was criticized by some for its response. Some of the criticism was directed at Sheriff Scott Israel for the Broward County Sheriff's Office not addressing warnings about the gunman, Nikolas Cruz, despite Cruz's lengthy record of threatening behavior from the age of nine.

The sheriff's department had received 19 calls over the span of a decade relating to Cruz (some when Cruz was as young as nine years old; they ranged from a call to the police reporting that Cruz was cursing, to a call saying he had shot a chicken with a BB gun). In response to some of the calls, deputies met with Cruz's mother.

Stoneman Douglas High School conducted a "threat assessment" on Cruz after the counselor's report, and the Florida Department of Children and Families ultimately concluded that Cruz was not a threat because he was living with his mother, attending school, and seeing a counselor.

The FBI admitted that it had received a tip (saying the caller suspected Cruz would shoot up a school) that its protocols required the FBI to further investigate, but that the FBI had failed to do so.

Broward County Sheriff's Office Deputies were criticized for staying outside the school, and not immediately confronting the gunman. During the shooting, an armed sheriff's deputy was outside of the school, but did not enter. Afterward Israel criticized the deputy, saying that he should have "went in, addressed the killer, killed the killer".

It was later discovered that there may have been at least two other deputies, who arrived later, who also did not enter the building. Coral Springs police officers who arrived at the scene were surprised to find that the deputies still had not entered the building. A Florida sheriff on a reviewing panel said that several of the Broward deputies on the scene failed to take command, and seemed disengaged or were distracted or failed to act at all, driving back and forth outside the school during the shooting. Disciplinary action was taken against various deputies.

This was followed by resignations of several police officers who had responded to the scene, and Israel's suspension 11 months later by new Governor Ron DeSantis. A commission appointed by then-Governor Rick Scott to investigate the shooting condemned the police inaction, and urged school districts across the state to adopt greater measures of security.

=== Conflict between sheriffs and deputies ===
==== Under Scott Israel ====
Scott Israel received a vote of no-confidence linked to the mishandling of the Stoneman Douglas High School shooting, the first such vote in the Department's history. The Broward Sheriff's Office Deputies Association voted 534–94 against Israel, with union President Jeff Bell vowing to ask Governor Rick Scott to consider removing Israel and praising the "great courage" of members who voted "under threat of retaliation and reprisal." Scott took no action.

Israel described the no confidence vote as a "political stunt" intended to help the union in salary bargaining with the department, at that time underway. Bell denied this. The largest union of sheriff's office employees, the Federation of Public Employees, which does not represent any sworn law enforcement employees, gave Israel a vote of confidence.

On January 11, 2019, Florida Governor Ron DeSantis, three days after his inauguration, announced that he had signed an executive order suspending Sheriff Scott Israel because of his department's handling of the 2018 Stoneman Douglas High School shooting. DeSantis appointed former Coral Springs Police Sergeant Gregory Tony as sheriff to replace Israel.

==== Under Gregory Tony ====
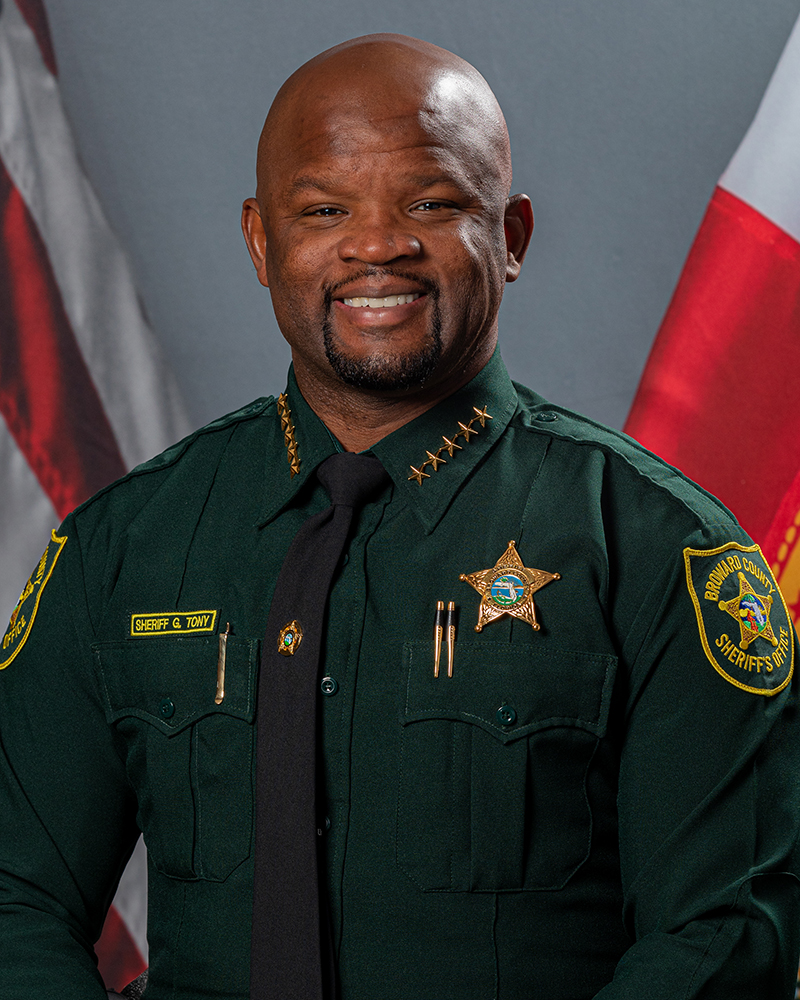
Gregory Tony

On January 11, 2019, days after Florida Governor DeSantis took office, he appointed Gregory Tony the Sheriff of Broward County.

Tony ran to be elected to a full term in the 2020 Democratic primary, which practically guarantees election in democratic Broward. Israel, Al Pollock, Willie Jones, Andrew Maurice Smalling, and Santiago Vazquez also competed in the election. While the Sun-Sentinel, Broward County's leading newspaper, endorsed Israel, Tony narrowly prevailed – winning 37% of the vote to Israel's 35%. Tony defeated Wayne Clark in the general election with 63% of the vote.

Tony made police reform the central issue of his campaign. In his first campaign advertisement he stated that he "suspended and fired some deputies accused of excessive force. He fired Christopher Krickovich after the department Professional Standards Committee recommended he be exonerated, and he replaced all the members of the Committee except for Jeff Bell." He fired "at least five deputies" for misconduct.

He also fired deputies Kevin Fanti and Jorge Sobrino. Tony fired deputies Brian Miller, Edward Eason, and Joshua Stambaugh for neglect of duty during the Stoneman Douglas High School shooting.

On April 3, 2020, Broward deputy Shannon Bennett, 39, died from COVID-19 which he contracted in the line of duty during the COVID-19 pandemic in Florida. As of April 5, more than a dozen Sheriff's Office employees had tested positive. On April 7, Deputy Union president Jeff Bell published a column in the Sun Sentinel, accusing Tony of poor leadership and specifically not providing deputies with sufficient personal protective equipment and Tony's failure to respond to their memos about the situation, a charge Tony denied in a news conference held the same day.

Tony referred to Bell as a "rogue employee", who, although a deputy, works full time for the union and "hasn't worn a uniform in years". Tony described Bell's actions as "dishonorable" because of his attempt, in Tony's words, to use Bennett's death "to politicize and capitalize on a moment when we lost one of our own".

On April 10, Tony suspended Jeff Bell indefinitely with pay, "saying he made false statements, has corrupt practices, has exhibited conduct that is unbecoming and has not used proper discretion", and started an Internal Affairs case. Tony then terminated the union president in January 2022.

On April 15 there were 77 positive coronavirus cases reported in the department.

On April 20, the Deputies union released the results of a 693–93 vote of no confidence in Tony, and the Lieutenants union, also citing the lack of personal protective equipment, a vote of 33–5.

On June 3, 2020, the union wrote governor DeSantis to formally request that Tony be removed. The governor did not take any action.

== Programs ==
=== Domestic violence prevention ===
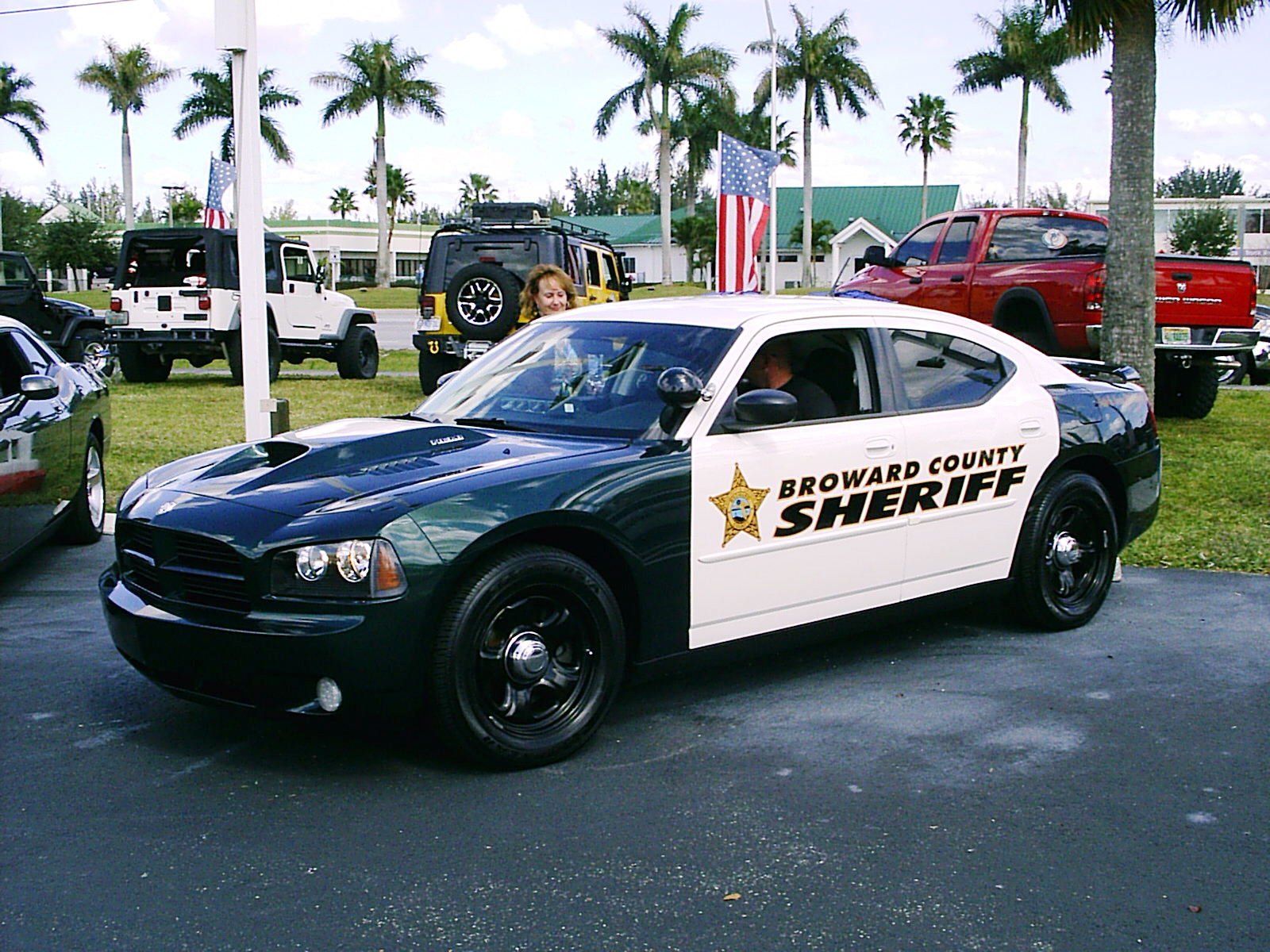
Broward County Sheriff vehicle

Broward County Sheriff's Office works in partnership with Women in Distress (WID) to prevent domestic violence. WID is a nationally accredited, state-certified, full service domestic violence center in Broward County that provides victims of domestic violence with safe shelter, crisis intervention and resources, and to educate the community in order to Stop Abuse For Everyone (SAFE) through intervention, education and advocacy.

== Media ==
The Broward County Sheriff's Office was featured prominently in the first season of COPS in 1989. They were the first department to be featured on the show when the show first premiered.

== District offices ==
- Central Broward
- Cooper City
- Court Services
- Dania Beach
- Deerfield Beach
- Ft. Lauderdale-Hollywood International Airport
- Lauderdale-By-The-Sea
- Lauderdale Lakes
- North Lauderdale
- Oakland Park
- Parkland
- West Park
- Pompano Beach
- Port Everglades
- Tamarac
- Weston and Unincorporated West Broward

== Broward Sheriff Fire Rescue ==
Broward Sheriff Fire Rescue

Operational area
- Country: United States
- State: Florida
- County: Broward County

Agency overview
- Established: 2003
- Employees: 700+
- Staffing: Career
- Fire chief: Timothy Keefe
- Deputy Chief: Harris Bouchillon
- EMS level: ALS
- IAFF: 3333

Facilities and equipment
- Battalions: 8
- Stations: 22
- Engines: 19
- Quints: 5
- Squads: 1
- Rescues: 1
- Ambulances: 30
- Tenders: 2
- HAZMAT: 1
- Airport crash: 4
- Fireboats: 1
- Rescue boats: 1
- Light and air: 1
- Aerial Ladder Platforms: 4

Website
- Official website

=== History ===
In 1978, Broward County Commission created the Broward County Fire Department. This was done by merging various fire districts. The process was fully merged by 1981.

In 1973 Broward County EMS began providing ALS paramedic service from the parking lot of Plantation General Hospital.

In the early 1990s, Broward County Fire Department merged with Broward County EMS to create Broward County Fire Rescue. Firefighters began to be trained as paramedics, and EMS began training as firefighters. This increased the total trained firefighter/paramedics providing an optimal service to Broward County citizens.

Broward County Fire Rescue also started to create various Special Operations branches.

In 2003, Broward Sheriff's office gained control of Broward County Fire Rescue, Port Everglades Fire Rescue, and Ft. Lauderdale/Hollywood International Airport Fire Rescue through a contract with the Broward County Commission. These departments merged into Broward Sheriff Fire Rescue. The Sheriff's Office also gained the contracts for fire rescue services in the cities of Lauderdale Lakes and Cooper City.

=== Special Operations ===
Broward Sheriff Fire Rescue created and maintains several Special Operations Units.

Advanced Bicycle Unit
The Advanced Bicycle Unit is deployed when access by vehicle is impossible or impractical. BSO Fire Rescue also has an Advance Medical Bicycle Unit (AMBU) used during mass gatherings.
Air Rescue
The Air Rescue Unit provides emergency helicopter transport for all of Broward County. It is staffed with flight medics who administer the highest level of pre-hospital care. The unit can also perform inter-hospital patient transport, and search and rescue missions.
Technical Rescue Team (TRT)
The Technical Rescue Team respond to extreme rescue incidents like building collapse, trench rescue, confined spaces, high and low angle rescues, and vehicle extrications. The TRT responds from Station 32 and responds county wide.
Hazardous Materials Unit
The Hazmat team responds to releases of biological, chemical, or nuclear agents. Typically, this is in the form of spills, transportation incidents, fuels spills, and gas leaks. Based at Station 17.
SWAT/Tactical Medics
Tactical Medics provide medical care for tactical teams during operations.

Station No.	Location	Engine Company	Quint Company or Platform Company	Rescue Unit (EMS)	Other Units
1	Dania Beach		Quint 1	Rescue 1 Rescue 201	
4	Deerfield Beach	Engine 4		Rescue 4	
6	Port Everglades	Engine 6 Engine 206		Rescue 6	Chemical 6 Fireboat 6 Battalion 6
7	Hallandale Beach	Engine 7	Quint 7	Rescue 7	Battalion 7
10	Ft. Lauderdale-Hollywood International Airport	Engine 10		Rescue 10	Battalion 10; Truck 410; Truck 810; Truck 910
14	Fort Lauderdale	Engine 14		Rescue 14	
17	Dania Beach		Quint 17	Rescue 17	Battalion 17; HazMat 17
21	Weston/Unincorporated West Broward		Quint 21	Rescue 21	Battalion 21; Tender 21
23	Broadview Park	Engine 23			Tender 23
27	Pembroke Park/West Park	Engine 27		Rescue 27; Rescue 227	
28	Cooper City	Engine 28	Quint 28	Rescue 28; Rescue 228	
32	Fort Lauderdale	Engine 32	Platform 32	Rescue 32; Rescue 232	Squad 32; TRT 32
37	Lauderdale Lakes	Engine 37		Rescue 37; Rescue 237	Battalion 37
51	Deerfield Beach			Rescue 51	
55	Weston/Unincorporated West Broward	Engine 55		Rescue 55	Battalion 55
60	Hallandale Beach	Engine 60		Rescue 60	
66	Deerfield Beach	Engine 66		Rescue 66	
67	Weston/Unincorporated West Broward	Engine 67		Rescue 67; Rescue 267	
75	Deerfield Beach	Engine 75		Rescue 75	
81	Weston/Unincorporated West Broward	Engine 81	Platform 81	Rescue 81	
85	Fort Lauderdale Executive Airport				Air Rescue 85
90	Hallandale Beach			Rescue 90	
93	Dania Beach		Quint 93	Rescue 93	
102	Deerfield Beach	Engine 102	Platform 102	Rescue 102	Battalion 102
106	Weston/Unincorporated West Broward	Engine 106		Rescue 106	Air Boat 106; Brush 106
111	Deerfield Beach			Rescue 111	

== List of sheriffs ==
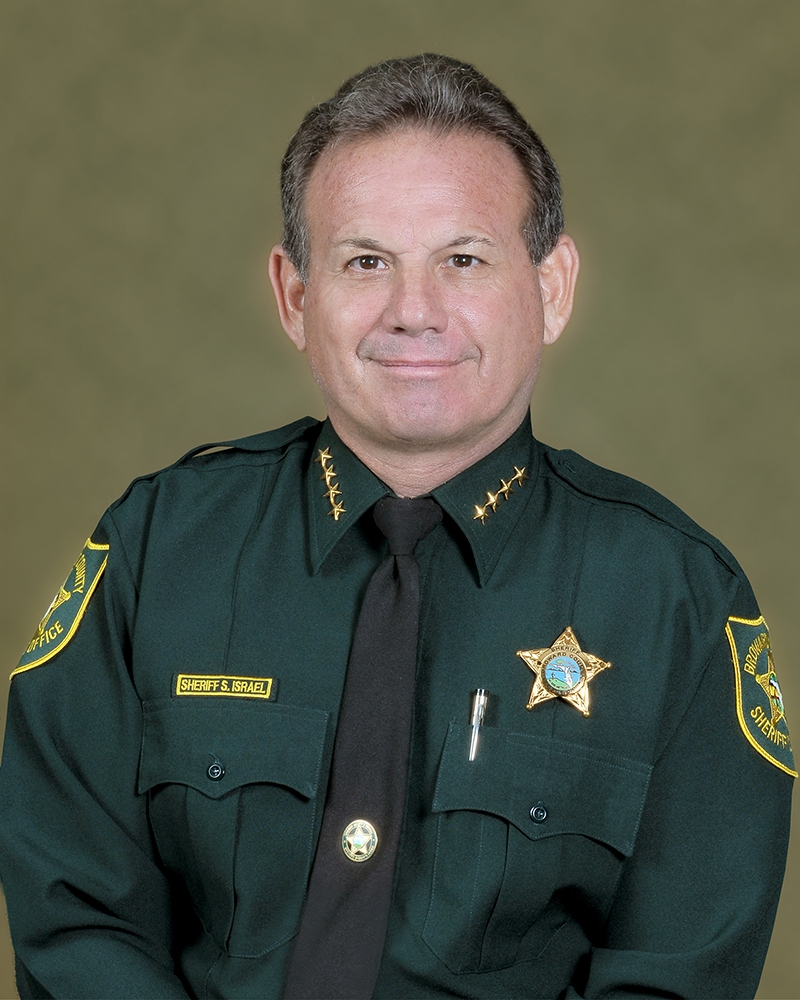
Scott Israel

- A.W. Turner (1915 - 1925)
- Paul C. Bryan (1925 - 1927)
- A.W. Turner (1927 - 1931)
- Walter Clark (1931 - 1939)
- Eddie Lee (1939 - 1940)
- Walter Clark (1941 - 1950)
- Amos Hall (1951 - 1957)
- J.A. "Quill" Lloyd (1957 - 1961)
- Allen B. Michell (1961 - 1968)
- Thomas Walker (1968)
- Edward J. Stack (1969 - 1979)
- Robert Butterworth (1979 - 1982)
- George Brescher (1983 - 1985)
- Nick Navarro (1985 - 1993)
- Ron Cochran (1993 - 1997)
- Ken Jenne (1997 - 2007)
- Al Lamberti (2007 - 2013)
- Scott Israel (2013 – 2019)
- Gregory Tony (2019–present)

== See also ==
- List of law enforcement agencies in Florida
- County sheriff (Florida)
