= Fort Lauderdale airport shooting =

2017 mass shooting in Florida, U.S.

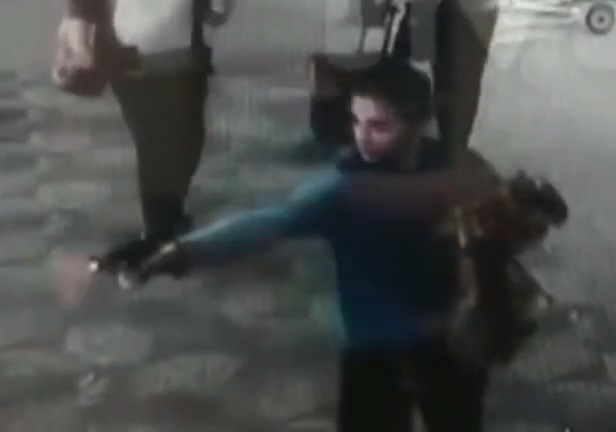
- CCTV still shows Santiago opening fire

- Fort Lauderdale–Hollywood International Airport (Florida) Fort Lauderdale–Hollywood International Airport (the United States)
- Location: 26°04′22″N 80°08′36″W; Fort Lauderdale–Hollywood International Airport, Broward County, Florida, U.S.
- Date: January 6, 2017; 9 years ago 12:55 p.m. (EST; UTC−05:00)
- Attack type: Mass shooting, mass murder
- Weapon: Walther PPS 9mm semi-automatic pistol
- Deaths: 5
- Injuries: 42 (6 by gunfire)
- Perpetrator: Esteban Santiago-Ruiz

On January 6, 2017, a mass shooting occurred at Fort Lauderdale–Hollywood International Airport in Broward County, Florida, United States, near the baggage claim in Terminal 2. Five people were killed while six others were injured in the shooting. About 36 people sustained injuries in the ensuing panic. Esteban Santiago-Ruiz, who flew in to the airport from Alaska and committed the shooting with a Walther PPS 9mm semi-automatic pistol, was disarmed and taken into custody by a Broward County Sheriff's Office (BSO) deputy within 85 seconds of the first shots being fired. Santiago was later diagnosed with schizophrenia and pleaded guilty to avoid possible execution. On August 17, 2018, Santiago was sentenced to five consecutive life sentences plus 120 years in prison.

== Attack ==
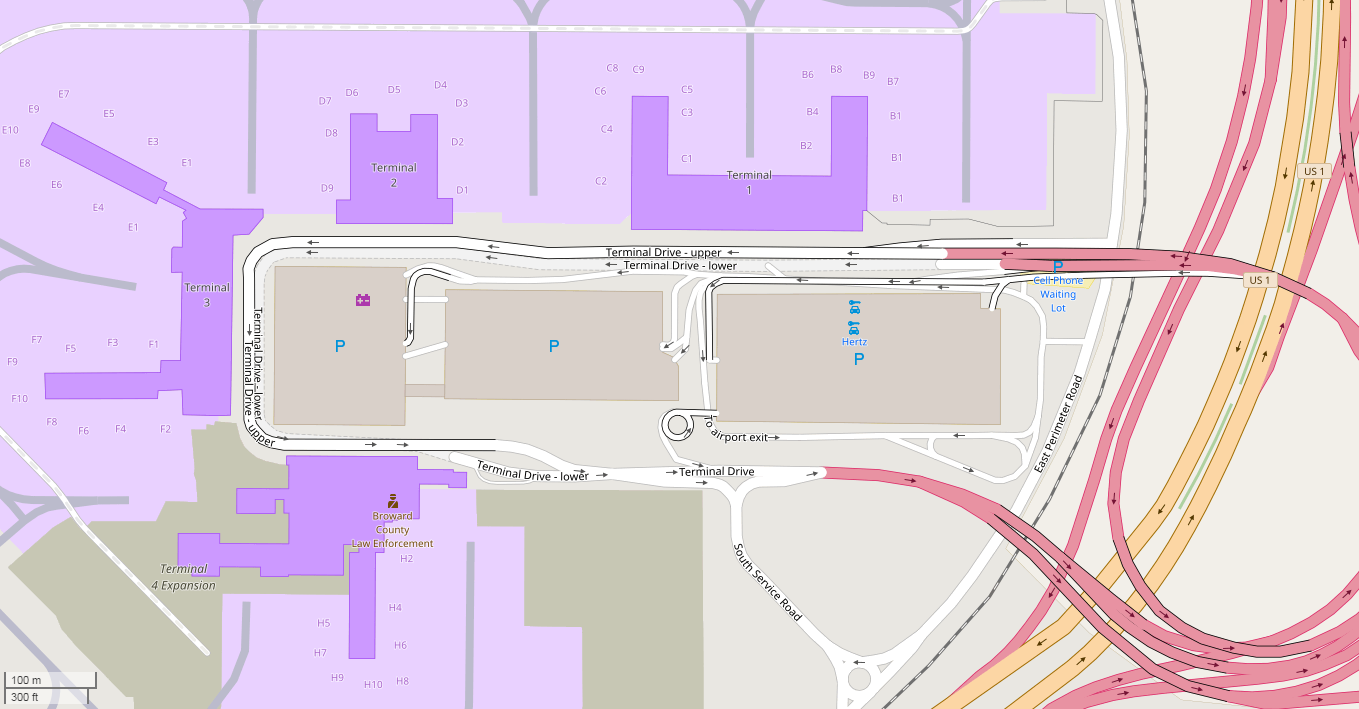
The attack happened near the baggage claim in Terminal 2.

On January 6, 2017, at 12:53 p.m. EST, the shooter, who had flown in from Alaska, arrived in from MSP Airport in Minneapolis, went to the baggage claim area and opened fire with a Walther PPS 9mm semi-automatic pistol in the Fort Lauderdale–Hollywood International Airport. He opened fire in the baggage claim area of Terminal 2, which is the host terminal for Delta Air Lines and Air Canada. He killed five people and injured six others. The shooting lasted 70 to 80 seconds. The killer had purchased the gun legally, and legally checked it in his luggage. After he stopped shooting, the killer laid down on the floor. He discharged his pistol a total of 15 times during the attack.

A nearby Broward County Sheriff's Office (BSO) deputy immediately responded by running to the sound of gunfire and apprehended the killer within 85 seconds. The deputy had been trained to react immediately to an active shooter and said: "I was basically going - reacting ... - what I was trained to do. So I went towards the shooting." The following year, the BSO deputy was named Deputy of the Year by the Florida Sheriffs Association. Other responding BSO officers also reacted in a manner that Special Master J. Dudley Goodlette, who later reviewed the incident, said was "textbook." Broward County Sheriff Scott Israel said that law enforcement officers did not fire shots, and arrested the gunman without further incident. The Special Master found that the shooting "was not preventable by Sheriff Israel or anyone else".

Video showed travelers rushing out of the airport, and hundreds of people waiting on a ramp, as numerous law enforcement officers rushed to the scene. A brief panic occurred following "unfounded reports of additional gunshots". The false alarm touched off a brief panic in other terminals. Former White House Press Secretary Ari Fleischer tweeted from the airport, "Shots have been fired. Everyone is running."

== Aftermath ==
The Federal Aviation Administration issued a ground stop notice, closing the airport to all but emergency flights. Port Everglades, staffed by the American Red Cross, assisted about 10,000 passengers who were bussed there for food, shelter, and to connect to transportation. The airport remained closed for the remainder of the day, but reopened to commercial flights early the following day. Following the shooting, more than 20,000 pieces of baggage were left at the airport amid the chaos.

President Obama was briefed about the shooting by Assistant to the President for Homeland Security and Counterterrorism Lisa Monaco. President-elect Donald Trump tweeted that he was monitoring the situation and that he had spoken with Florida Governor Rick Scott regarding the shooting. President Obama later consoled the victims and said that he had asked his staff to reach out to Mayor Jack Seiler in order to make sure efforts were coordinated between state and local officials. Scott ordered flags of the United States and of Florida to be flown at half-mast throughout the state on January 7 and 8 to honor the victims.

After the shooting, Sheriff Israel called for a ban on assault rifles to be reinstated, and said that he didn't believe that people with mental illness should have access to firearms. He said: “All I’m going to do is speak my mind. If I’m on an island, I’m on an island. I’m not going to worry about who is with me or who is not.”

== Victims ==
Five people died in the attack, all of whom were passing through Fort Lauderdale to begin cruises with their spouses. The number of people injured due to the shooting was six, with three admitted to intensive care units. The sheriff said that in addition to the people injured by gunshots, about 30 to 40 others were "injured in the panic" during the event.

== Perpetrator ==
Esteban Santiago-Ruiz
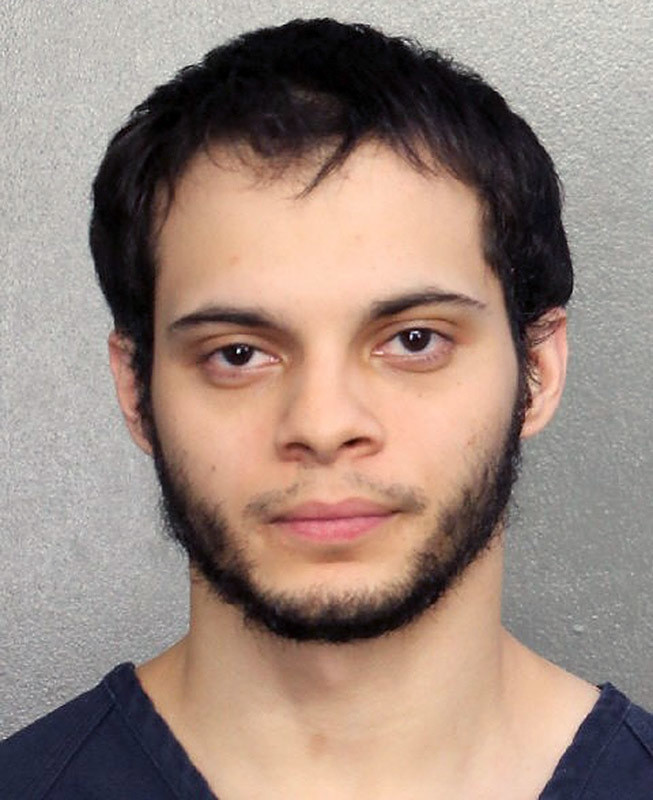
- Broward County Sheriff's Office mugshot
- Born: March 16, 1990 (age 36); Union City, New Jersey, U.S.
- Citizenship: American
- Employers: Puerto Rico National Guard; Alaska Army National Guard; Signal 88 Security (Anchorage); Unemployed
- Children: 1 son
- Status: Incarcerated
- Convictions: Performing an act of violence at an international airport causing death (18 U.S.C. § 37) (5 counts); Performing an act of violence at an international airport causing serious bodily injury (18 U.S.C. § 37) (6 counts)
- Penalty: Five life terms plus 120 years without parole

Details
- Date: January 6, 2017
- Imprisoned at: USP Tucson

Esteban Santiago-Ruiz (born March 16, 1990), a 26-year-old resident of Alaska, unemployed, and a former Alaska Army National Guard and Puerto Rican National Guard member, was arrested immediately after the shooting.

Santiago flew on a Delta Air Lines flight from Ted Stevens Anchorage International Airport in Alaska, connecting through Minneapolis–Saint Paul International Airport. Investigators say that he declared a 9mm pistol with two magazines, locked in a secure container, his only checked baggage. He retrieved it in Fort Lauderdale and loaded the gun in the airport bathroom just before the attack. Santiago was reported to be carrying military identification at the time of the shooting.

Santiago was born in New Jersey in 1990 and moved to Puerto Rico two years later. He lived most of his life in Peñuelas, Puerto Rico, and attended high school there. He joined the Puerto Rico National Guard on December 14, 2007, and served in the Iraq War from April 23, 2010, to February 19, 2011, as a combat engineer. He served in the Alaska Army National Guard from November 21, 2014, until August 16, when he received a general discharge for "unsatisfactory performance." He was a private first class and received ten awards during his time in the military. He began to suffer mental illness after his tour in Iraq; according to his family, he was severely affected by seeing a bomb explode near two of his friends while in service. He had received psychological treatment shortly before the airport attack.

The Puerto Rico Police opened an investigation into his erratic behavior and confiscated his firearms in March 2012. They were, however, returned to him in May 2014. He also obtained a Florida driver's license in August 2012 even though he never lived in Florida, per official records. He provided the license on his successful application for permission to carry a concealed gun in Puerto Rico. He later moved from Puerto Rico to Alaska, along with his brother, in the same year.

While in Alaska, Santiago worked as a security guard for a private company, where he was described as being "quiet and solitary." He became increasingly violent over the following year. In January 2016, Santiago was arrested and charged with assault in an incident involving his girlfriend in Anchorage, Alaska. Police alleged that Santiago yelled at her, broke down the door, and choked her. The case resulted in a deferred prosecution agreement, and a domestic violence temporary protection order had expired.

Santiago was subsequently scheduled to appear by telephone for sentencing in the domestic violence case in mid-April 2017.

Santiago visited the FBI field office in Anchorage in November 2016, telling the FBI that the U.S. government was controlling his mind and making him watch online videos by the Islamic State of Iraq and the Levant, and that he was being forced to join that group by the CIA. He said that he was hearing voices in his head telling him to commit acts of violence, but he also said that he was in control and did not intend to hurt anyone. The FBI urged him to seek mental health treatment, and notified the local police who detained him and took him to a medical facility for a mental health evaluation. He was later investigated by the FBI, which discovered no links to terrorism or any violation of laws occurring during the Alaska incident.

Alaska police took his handgun from him due to the incident and held it for 20 days before returning it in December because Santiago had not been convicted of a serious crime, involuntarily committed to a mental institution, or adjudicated as mentally defective. He had also been dismissed as a security guard at Signal 88 Security on November 15, due to his mental health problems.

== Investigation ==
Santiago, the sole shooter in the attack, fired a semi-automatic 9mm handgun at people in the baggage claim in Terminal 2. Per court documents and a federal affidavit, Santiago admitted to planning the attack, buying a one-way ticket to the airport and checking a box with a Walther 9mm semiautomatic handgun and the two ammunition magazines he used in the shooting. He stated that he later loaded his handgun in a bathroom at the airport and "shot the first people he encountered" after coming out.

Santiago made a flight reservation to New York City for December 31, 2016, which officials told ABC News might have been his preferred destination. However, he canceled the reservation, and investigators believe that the deployment of a large number of NYPD officers may have been the reason he did so. He booked a one-way ticket to Florida a few days later. Counterterrorism officials in New York meanwhile investigated his plan to visit the city and whether he planned to stay or transfer to another flight. The FBI stated that he appeared to have arrived in the city specifically to carry out the shooting. Investigators found no specific reason why he chose the airport or motive for the attack.

The Qupqugiaq Inn, a motel in midtown Anchorage where Santiago had recently lived, was evacuated and searched on the day of the shooting. The FBI seized the motel's dumpster, towing it away to the Anchorage field office to be searched. Agents conducted interviews with 175 witnesses and people who knew Santiago.

TMZ released a leaked "surveillance video" of the shooting on January 8 which led to the launch of an investigation into the leak. A Broward Sheriff's Office deputy, identified as the individual who leaked the video, was put on paid suspension pending investigation.

Investigators stated that during initial interviews, the suspect said that he had been under "government mind control" and "hearing voices" and that he had been "participating in jihadi chat rooms online" before the attack. Santiago had not been flagged as having any link to terrorism, and in April 2017, investigators reported that no link to terrorism was found. During interviews with police after the attack, Santiago also stated that the gun used in the shooting was the same weapon seized and later returned by the police in Anchorage in 2016.

== Prosecution ==
The day after the shooting, federal officials filed criminal charges against him including performing an act of violence at an international airport, using and carrying a firearm during and in relation to a crime of violence and causing the death of a person through use of a firearm.

A federal public defender was appointed for Santiago since he was unable to pay for a lawyer. He was ordered detained without bond, and was indicted on 22 federal charges on January 26. He pleaded not guilty to all the charges during a court hearing on January 30, 2017.

After his arrest, Santiago was diagnosed with schizophrenia as well as schizoaffective disorder. He initially refused to take psychotropic medication, but later took medications, and his mental condition showed marked improvement. He was deemed legally competent to stand trial.

Before trial, Santiago's attorneys and federal prosecutors made a plea agreement in which Santiago would plead guilty in return for a sentence of life in prison, avoiding the death penalty, which federal prosecutors had originally considered pursuing. On May 23, 2018, Santiago pleaded guilty in the shooting.

On August 17, 2018, Santiago was sentenced to five consecutive life sentences plus 120 years in prison. On September 12, 2018, he was transferred from FDC Miami to FTC Oklahoma City. On September 20, he was then transferred to USP Allenwood given Federal Bureau of Prisons number 15500-104. In June 2021, Santiago-Ruiz was transferred from Allenwood to USP Tucson.

== See also ==
- 1996 Timika shooting
- 2002 Los Angeles International Airport shooting
- List of rampage killers in the United States
