= Stop Abuse for Everyone =

Lobbying organization in California, US

Stop Abuse For Everyone
- Abbreviation: SAFE
- Formation: 1996; 30 years ago
- Founder: Jade Rubick
- Tax ID no.: 25-1437752
- Legal status: 501(c)(3) nonprofit organization
- Headquarters: Bakersfield, California, United States
- President: Ronald Henry
- Revenue: $328,801 (2014)
- Expenses: $319,544 (2014)
- Employees: 2 (2013)
- Volunteers: 20 (2013)
- Website: www.stopabuseforeveryone.org

Stop Abuse For Everyone (SAFE) is a domestic violence organization started in 1996. It was formed in Portland, Oregon, and now is based out of Bakersfield, California. Stop Abuse For Everyone advocates for what they term an "inclusive" model of domestic violence. They state that their focus is on groups that are "lacking in services", such as men, gay, lesbian, and transgender victims, and the elderly.

SAFE claims that men are more victimized by physical abuse than women and "men were also the victims of psychological aggression and control over sexual or reproductive health more often than women."

== Relevancy ==
Stop Abuse For Everyone is an organization that professes to advocate for the plight of abused men and other "underserved" domestic violence groups, such as LGBT victims.

SAFE has made appearances at national conferences on domestic violence, media coverage, and lobbies to government entities in the United States.

SAFE was founded by Jade Rubick in 1996, and became a non-profit organization in 2001 with co-founders Phil Cook and Stanley Green.

== Community Organizations ==
SAFE is a national organization. One of the many community organizations working to extend SAFE to the community is Women in Distress (WID), a nationally accredited, state-certified, full service domestic violence center in Broward County, Florida.
