= International Union of Police Associations =

North American police union

IUPA
- International Union of Police Associations
- Founded: 1979
- Headquarters: Sarasota, Florida
- Location: United States, Canada
- Key people: Sam A. Cabral, President
- Main organ: NewsWatch
- Affiliations: AFL–CIO
- Website: iupa.org

The International Union of Police Associations (IUPA) is a North American police union, and is chartered as a national union that represents law enforcement and support personnel with the AFL–CIO.

== Organization ==
Local police unions join the IUPA to secure collective bargaining rights and afford their members job security. The IUPA negotiates on behalf of local unions for better wages, benefits, and working conditions in their contracts. The IUPA offers assistance on such items as equipment recommendation or budget issues, and will send a representative to speak for the union. Besides help with legal representation, the IUPA offers financial, insurance, and health services, educational opportunities, police products, and home services. Apart from police officers, IUPA also represents some corrections officers and medical first responders.

The IUPA publishes NewsWatch, a weekly publication for the law enforcement community.

The organization has been criticized for its status as charity: it received a 'D−' rating from the Better Business Bureau, and was listed among America's worst charities by the Tampa Bay Times in 2014 because of its low spending on its mission. IUPA operates under multiple trade names, including 'Police Officers Support Association' and 'National Emergency Responders Coalition'. The majority of their budget is spent on fundraising. In 2017, the IUPA raised about US$13 million through solicitors, of which almost US$12 million went to the solicitors.

=== Leadership ===
The union had, as of 2020, three compensated 'IUPA officer' positions listed on its website:

- Sam Cabral, who has been 'international president' since 1995 and officer of the organization since 1988. Cabral retired in 1991 from the Defiance, Ohio detective bureau.
- Mike Crivello is the 'international vice president' and former 'union president' (2010–18). Crivello retired in 2009 from the USAF Security Police, and in 2019 from the Milwaukee, Wisconsin Police Department.

Its board further consists of a number of uncompensated vice-presidents and had a total of 16 voting board members in 2016.

== History ==
In 1954, the predecessor of the IUPA, the National Conference of Police Associations (NCPA) was founded in an effort to strengthen bargaining efforts. In 1966, Canadian associations were allowed to join, and the name was changed to International Conference of Police Associations, and later to International Union of Police Associations. IUPA was founded in 1979 as a national union under AFL–CIO, reported to have 51,000 members by 1979/1980, and said it represented over 100,000 members in 2018. However, its 2016 form 990 are reported a much lower number: 19,200.

Since 2005, it has been headquartered in Sarasota, Florida, where it purchased a building in 2018 for its headquarters.

In April 2026, IUPA filed for Chapter 11 bankruptcy protection as it appealed a $2.25 million judgement over failure to prevent workforce sexual assault, claiming it would have struggled to continue operations if it did not file for bankruptcy.

== Policy positions and lobbying ==
In 2016, the IUPA was one of several law enforcement organizations that supported federal legislation to renew the Bulletproof Vest Partnership Grant Program. In 2020, IUPA spoke out about the importance of mental health concerns for law enforcement, describing stress as a bigger threat to police officers' safety and well-being than violence.

In 2017, the IUPA, together with the Ohio State Troopers Association, filed a lawsuit against a Florida company for manufacturing defective bulletproof vests. Also in 2017, a IUPA spokesperson warned about law enforcement officers being endangered by carbon monoxide fumes from defective Ford Explorer patrol cars.

In 2018, the IUPA was one of several organizations that supported the Providing Officers with Electronic Resources (POWER) Act to give various law enforcement access to screening devices suitable for detecting drugs such as fentanyl.

In September 2019, well over a year before the elections, the union formally endorsed the re-election campaign of Donald Trump, while stating that the Democratic contenders vilified the police.

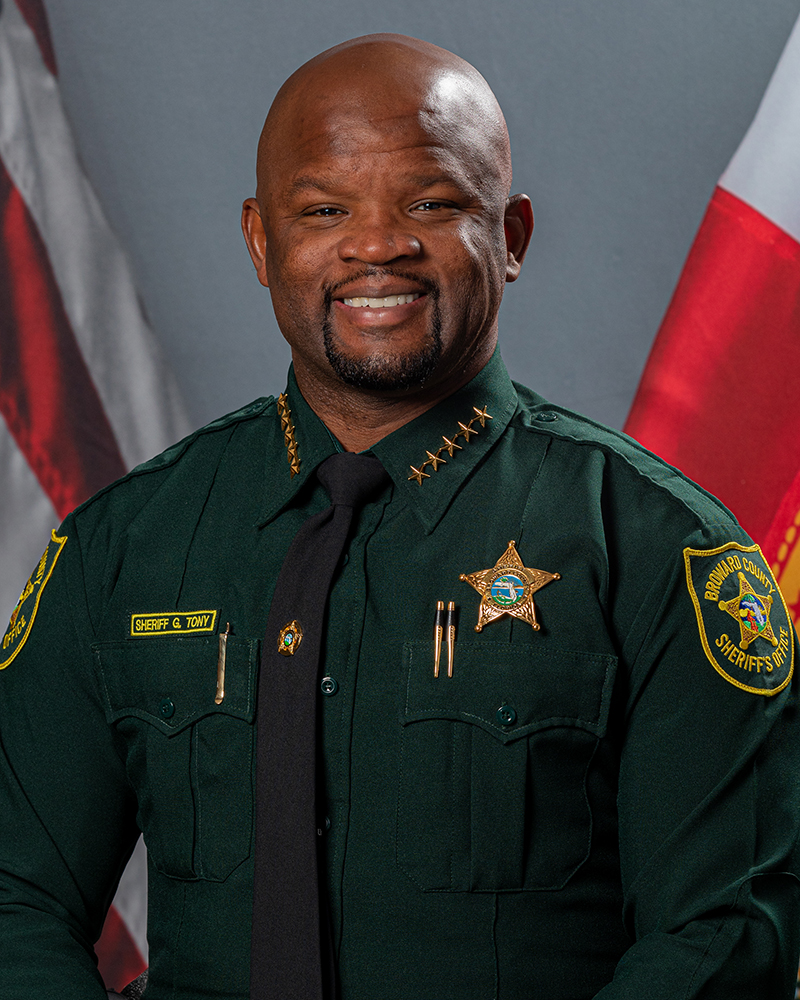
Gregory Tony

In April 2020, four days after a 39-year-old Broward Sheriff's Office deputy died from COVID-19, and after 20 other deputies tested positive for the virus, President Jeff Bell of the Broward Sheriff’s Office Deputies Association -- a 1,400-member branch of the IUPA -- criticized Broward County Sheriff Gregory Tony over the lack of personal protective equipment for the officers, and Tony's failure to respond to their memos about the situation. Tony said Bell’s actions were "dishonorable." That same month, Tony suspended the union president without pay, and placed him under administrative investigation, and Tony then terminated him in January 2022. The union announced a vote of no-confidence by its officers in Tony. A total of 88% of 786 voting road deputies and sergeants voted "no confidence" in Tony.

In June 2020, during the George Floyd protests, the AFL–CIO rejected demands by the Writers Guild of America, East and others to expel the IUPA.
