= Al Lamberti =

American law enforcement officer

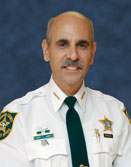

15th Sheriff of Broward County
- In office October 26, 2007 – January 8, 2013
- Appointed by: Charlie Crist
- Preceded by: Ken Jenne
- Succeeded by: Scott Israel

Personal details
- Born: April 14, 1954 (age 72) New York, New York
- Party: Republican
- Spouse: Holly Lamberti
- Children: 3
- Education: AS Degree in Law Enforcement; BA Degree in Criminal Justice
- Alma mater: Palm Beach Community College; Florida Atlantic University
- Occupation: law enforcement officer

Al Lamberti (born April 14, 1954) is a former sheriff of Broward County, which encompasses Fort Lauderdale in southeastern Florida.

== Education ==
Lamberti received a B.A. in criminal justice from Florida Atlantic University in 1981.

== Career ==
=== Coast Guard ===
Lamberti served in the U.S. Coast Guard at various duty stations, primarily in Miami, Florida. He was also assigned as a special agent in the Office of Intelligence and Law Enforcement, U.S. Coast Guard Reserve.

=== Law enforcement ===
Lamberti joined the Broward County Sheriff's Office as a detention deputy in 1977. He worked his way up the ranks, becoming a road patrol deputy, then a road patrol sergeant in the North Broward and Lauderdale Lakes districts. He then became lieutenant and captain in the Organized Crime Division. In January 1990, he assumed the position of district chief in Deerfield Beach. He was promoted to the rank of major in 1998. Lamberti then went on to serve as interim chief of police for the cities of Hollywood and North Lauderdale.

On October 26, 2007 Lamberti was named sheriff of Broward County by Governor Charlie Crist after Sheriff Ken Jenne was indicted on federal corruption charges. On November 4, 2008 Lamberti was elected the 17th sheriff of Broward County. As sheriff, he directed a 6,300-member organization with a nearly $700 million budget with responsibility for law enforcement and fire rescue duties within all 14 cities and towns and all unincorporated areas of Broward County.

On November 6, 2012, Lamberti was defeated in an election for sheriff by Scott Israel, who became the 18th sheriff of Broward County.
