= Women in Distress =

Domestic violence center in Broward County, Florida

- Abbreviation: WiD
- Formation: 1974
- Type: Domestic violence center
- Legal status: 501(c)(3)
- Headquarters: Fort Lauderdale, Florida, United States
- Region served: Broward County, Florida, United States
- President and CEO: Linda L. Parker, PhD
- Staff: 110
- Volunteers: 240
- Website: www.womenindistress.org

Women in Distress (WID) is a nationally accredited, state-certified, full service domestic violence center in Broward County, Florida. WID adopts an empowerment based model. WID provides victims of domestic violence with safe shelter, crisis intervention and resources, and raises community awareness through intervention, education and advocacy. WID works in partnership with the Broward County Sheriff's Office (BSO). At a press conference in October 2009, Florida Governor Charlie Crist commended Women in Distress and Broward Sheriff's Office for their joint efforts to combat domestic violence. In 2021 Women In Distress (WID), CASA in Pinellas, and The Spring of Tampa combined efforts to form FLDVC after the coalition was shut down to the financial malfeasance of FCADV CEO Tiffany Carr. As the contractor, WID holds the contract for the statewide domestic violence hotline, which receives over 12,000 calls a year. CASA has the subcontract for training and technical assistance for the state, and The Spring has the contract for Legal services, which includes overseeing all of the Injunction for Protection Project, and the Legal hotline.

In 2018–2019, WID received 7,966 calls on their 24-hour crisis line.

== History and Services ==
Women in Distress was established in 1972 as a nonprofit agency helping women in crisis, by feminist and women's rights activist Roxcy Bolton.

In 1974, Women in Distress of Broward County, Inc. was co-founded by Edee Greene. WiD's first refuge for homeless women was a donated four bedroom home. Eventually they opened their first crisis shelter, housing 12 homeless women. Following the murder of a client who had returned to her violent spouse to rejoin her children, further donations enabled the purchase of a 54-bed shelter, accommodating children of domestic violence victims and homeless women. In November 1995, the Jim and Jan Moran Family Center opened. In 1999 a $1 million endowment allowed WID to open a second 8-bed shelter in Hollywood.

In 2008, WID expanded with the purchase of a 6-acre campus in Deerfield Beach. The campus included a new Jim & Jan Moran Family Center, with 62 beds and has expanded to 135 beds. Services at the center include crisis intake, individual and group counseling, parenting classes, and respite child care. There is also a sub-station of the Broward Sheriff's Office on the site.

In 2018, WID added a pet shelter to the campus so survivors do not have to leave beloved pets behind when they flee.

== Community ==
To coincide with the county's growing diverse populations, WID has expanded its target communities to include Spanish, Creole, African, Middle Eastern, Russian, and Eastern European communities. Language services are provided by staff in English, Spanish, Creole and Portuguese. WID supports same-sex domestic violence victims through the EAGLE (Ending Abuse of Gays and Lesbians Everywhere…even at home) program.

In 2007, WID received an AmeriCorps grant. Twenty AmeriCorps members now work full-time in community education, each with a special focus area. These include schools, the Latin, Haitian, African American and Caribbean communities, legal professionals, civic groups, corporations, media, faith based organizations, health/fitness, and beauty salons.

== Financial effects on Women in Distress ==
The 41 domestic violence centers in Florida have seen a 25 to 30 percent increase in their demand for services since 2009. This is due to an increase both in incidents of domestic violence, and in the lethality of these incidents. In July 2011, Mary Riedel, the previous president and CEO of WID, stated that the steep increase in frequency and lethality of domestic violence is probably due to the impact of the economic downturn and the recession on families. Despite the increasing demands for its services, in August 2011, WID received news of an $8000 funding cut which will impact WID's phone hotline and counseling services.

Since the pandemic, WID and the county of Broward has seen a 25% increase in domestic violence incidents. Since 2008, bed nights have increased nearly 80% and the number of incidents coded as high lethality have increased nearly 30%.
