= Dick Wells =

American businessman (1922–2003)

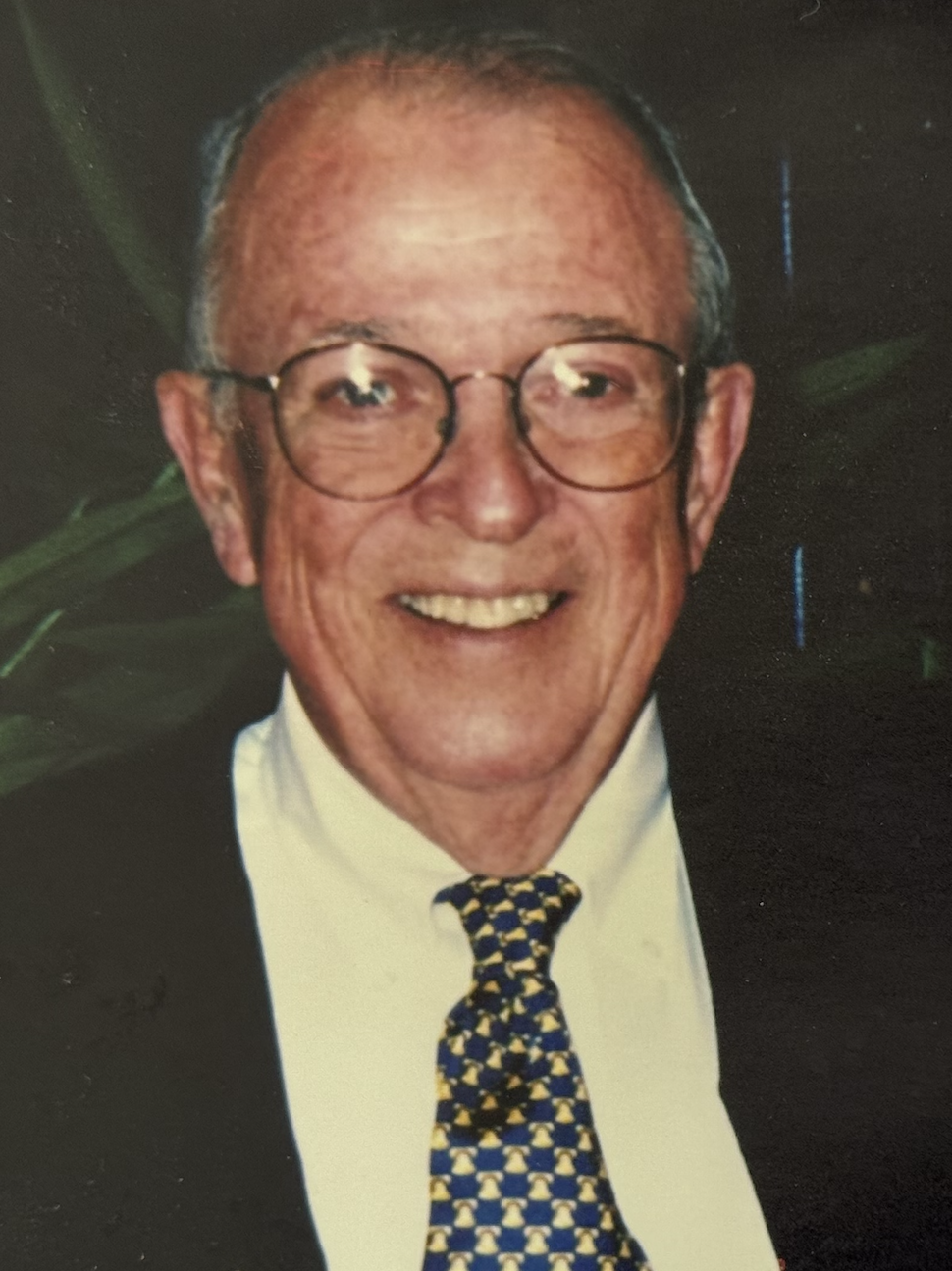
- Wells in 2000

Member of the Florida Tax Commission
- In office January 1979 – January 1987
- Governor: Bob Graham; Wayne Mixson
- Preceded by: Seat established
- Succeeded by: Seat reconstituted

Personal details
- Born: Richard Wells; October 8, 1922 Chicago, Illinois, U.S.
- Died: September 2, 2003 (aged 80) Fort Lauderdale, Florida, U.S.
- Party: Republican
- Spouses: Helen Shuman (divorced); Marion Gretsch (m. 1973)
- Relations: Wells family
- Children: 6 (Note: Including five stepchildren.)
- Parent(s): Preston A. Wells Sr. Lillian Shedd Wells
- Relatives: Thomas E. Wells (grandfather); John G. Shedd (great-grandfather); Greeley Wells (cousin)
- Education: Massachusetts Institute of Technology (BEng)
- Occupation: Businessman; cattle baron; philanthropist; military officer

Military service
- Allegiance: United States
- Branch/service: United States Marine Corps
- Years of service: 1943–1945
- Rank: Captain
- Unit: V Amphibious Corps
- Battles/wars: World War II; Battle of Iwo Jima
- Awards: Bronze Star; Marine Corps Good Conduct Medal; World War II Victory Medal; Asiatic–Pacific Campaign Medal; Combat Action Ribbon

Preston Albert Wells Jr. (born Richard Wells; October 8, 1922 – September 2, 2003) was an American chemical engineer, business magnate, real estate investor, and cattle baron. He was president of The Las Olas Company, owner of the Riverside Hotel and Rush Creek Ranch, and a board member of The Heritage Foundation. A member of the Republican Party, he served on the Florida Tax Commission from 1979 to 1987.

Born and raised in Chicagoland, Wells graduated with a bachelor's degree in engineering from MIT and joined the United States Marine Corps that same year. During World War II, he was deployed to the Pacific and fought the Axis powers at the Battle of Iwo Jima. Returning home from the war, Wells worked for the Quaker Oats Company as chief chemical engineer before taking control of his family's real estate business and expanding it across South Florida. At the time of his death, he was the largest landholder in Las Olas Isles. A major political donor, Wells donated millions of dollars to conservative causes and organizations for decades and served as chairman of the Intercollegiate Studies Institute from 2002 to 2003.

== Early life and education ==
Preston Albert Wells Jr. was born Richard Wells on October 8, 1922, in Chicago, Illinois, to Preston A. Wells Sr., son of Thomas E. Wells, and Lillian Shedd, granddaughter of John G. Shedd. He was raised in Winnetka, Illinois and graduated from North Shore Country Day School. Wells earned his bachelor's degree in chemical engineering from the Massachusetts Institute of Technology.

In 1935, Wells visited Salzburg, Austria, while under Austrofascist rule, and returned home to Chicago aboard the RMS Majestic with his parents, Giorgio Polacco, and Edith Mason.

== Career and military service ==
While attending MIT, Wells participated in Army ROTC before cross-commissioning into the United States Marine Corps in 1943. During World War II, he fought the Empire of Japan in the Pacific theatre at the Battle of Iwo Jima. After the surrender of Japan, Wells retired from service at the rank of Captain, having received the Bronze Star Medal, Marine Corps Good Conduct Medal, World War II Victory Medal, Asiatic–Pacific Campaign Medal, and the Combat Action Ribbon for his actions. His first cousin, then-First Lieutenant Greeley Wells, adjutant of 2nd Battalion, 28th Marines, served on the island with Wells and was a part of the raising of the U.S. flag on Iwo Jima. After a long search across the island, Wells found his cousin Greeley at a command post on Mount Suribachi, describing the search as "the most dangerous part of my stay on Iwo Jima". After returning home from the war, Wells worked for the Quaker Oats Company as the chief engineer of the chemical division.

Wells gained control of The Las Olas Company in 1972. The company owned the Riverside Hotel in Fort Lauderdale and other large properties across Broward County, Florida. Through the company, he owned nearly 60% of land on Las Olas Boulevard.

In January 1979, Wells was appointed as a member of the Florida Tax Commission by Governor Bob Graham.

For most of his adult life, Wells was the primary owner of Rush Creek Ranch in Nebraska; founded by his grandfather in 1890.

== Political views and contributions ==
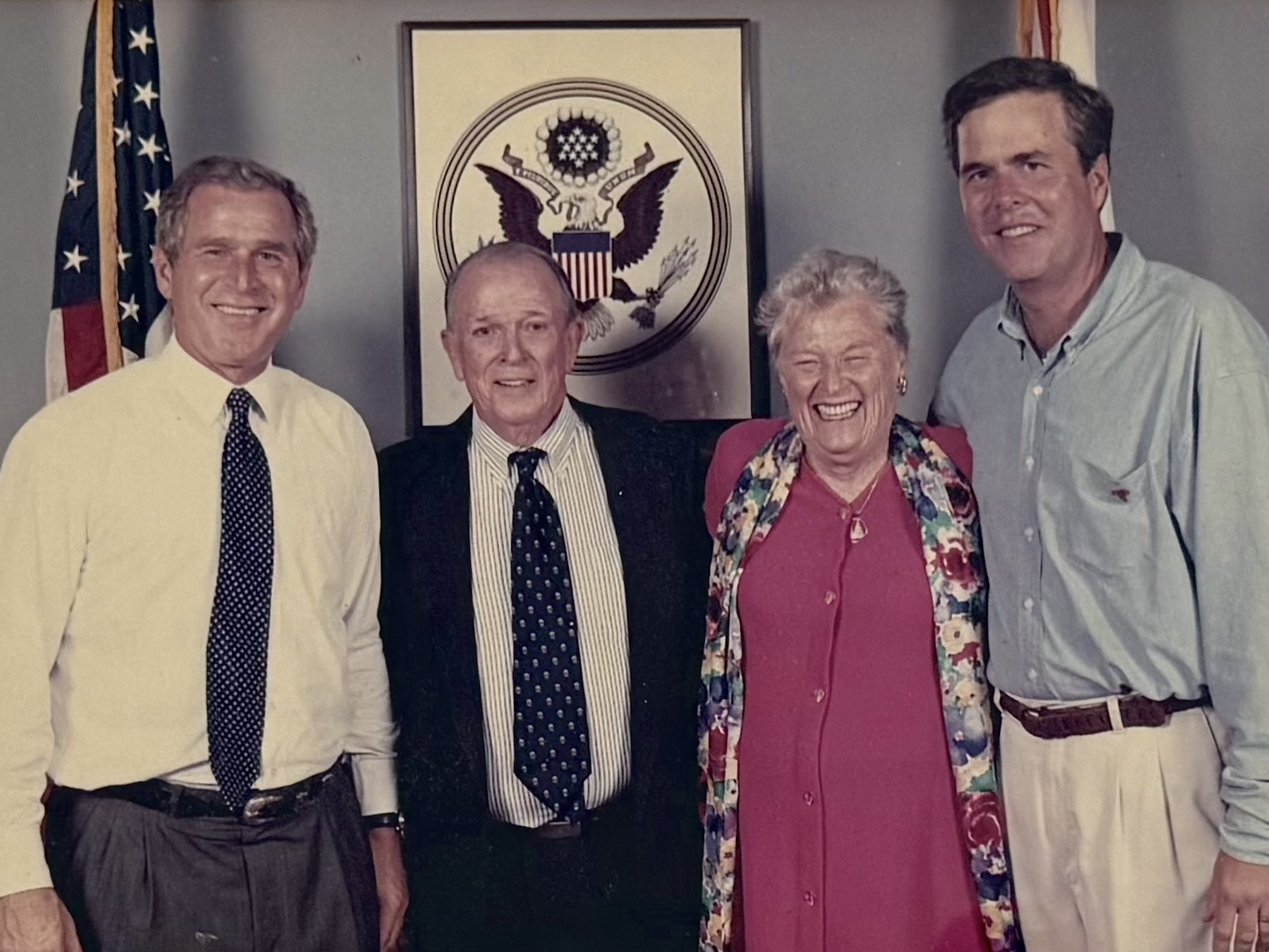
Wells and his wife, Marion, with President George W. Bush and Governor Jeb Bush in 2002

For many years, Wells donated to the Republican Party and supported conservative causes. He was a member of the board of trustees of The Heritage Foundation for nearly 30 years. The "Preston A. Wells, Jr. Senior Research Fellow, Center for Health and Welfare Policy" and "Preston A. Wells Jr. Day" were named in his honor.

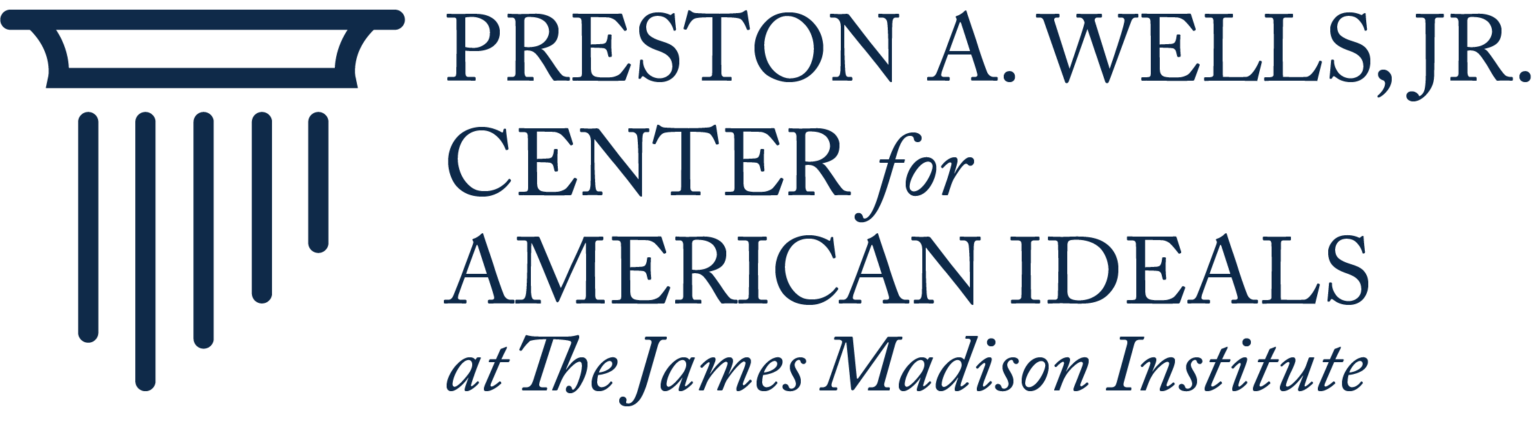
Logo of the Preston A. Wells, Jr. Center for American Ideals at the James Madison Institute

He was a major donor during the foundation of the James Madison Institute. The institute designated "Preston A. Wells Jr. Day" in his honor and named their "Center for American Ideals" after him. Wells was also a donor and board member of his wife's non-profit, the Marion G. Wells Foundation.

From 2002 until his death, Wells was chairman of the Intercollegiate Studies Institute; an annual award was designated in his honor.

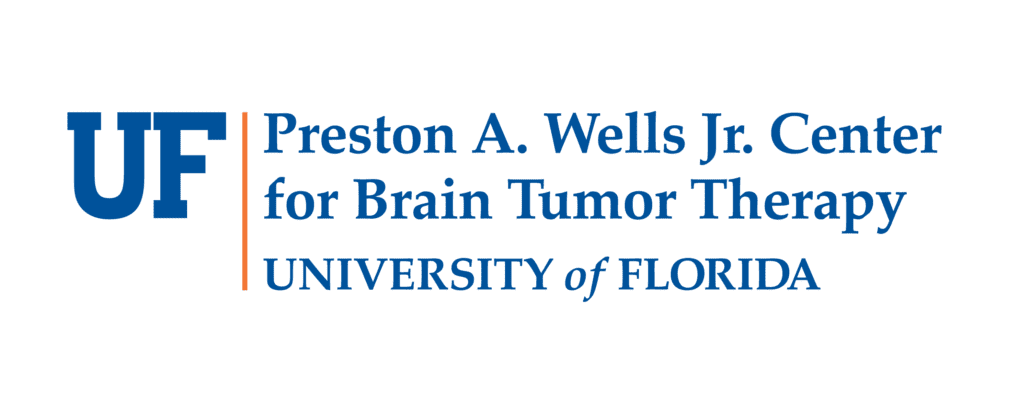
Logo of the Preston A. Wells Jr. Center for Brain Tumor Therapy at the University of Florida

After significant donations, the University of Florida's Department of Neurology was named after his mother, Lillian, and the department's Center for Brain Tumor Therapy was named after him.

== Personal life and family ==
In 1946, Wells married Helen Whirle Shuman. The couple eventually divorced after having a daughter, Barbara. He married his second wife, Marion Gretsch, in 1973. They lived in Fort Lauderdale, Florida, until his death.

In 1991, Wells and his wife were shipwrecked in The Bahamas after their 54-foot sailboat, the Wells Cargo, struck a rock and sank. They were stranded on a small cay before being rescued by a passing cruise ship.

Wells died from cancer in Fort Lauderdale, on September 2, 2003, at the age of 80. Upon the announcement of his death, Edwin Feulner reacted by saying: “We will miss his quiet and principled guidance in every area of Heritage’s activities.” In 2007, the City of Fort Lauderdale posthumously awarded Wells the title of "Honored Founder" for his contributions to the city.
