= Wells family =

American business family

- Current region: United States
- Founded: Arrival in the United States 1870, Chicago; 156 years ago
- Founder: Thomas E. Wells
- Historic seat: Orchard Farm
- Titles: List: Wells baronets; Florida Tax Commissioner; Mayor (Harding Township); Police commissioner
- Members: List: Sir Thomas Wells; Dick Wells; Greeley Wells; Marion Wells
- Properties: List: Riverside Hotel; Rush Creek Ranch

The Wells family is an American business, banking, ranching, military, and political family in the U.S. states of Florida, Illinois, Nebraska, and New Jersey. The family is a major political donor to the Republican Party and is one of the largest land-owning families in the state of Nebraska.

Modern descendants of the Wells family trace their lineage back to Sir Thomas E. Wells, who built a business empire in the United States during the Gilded Age. The ancestral family home is Orchard Farm, purchased by Sir Thomas in 1904. The family currently owns the Riverside Hotel in Fort Lauderdale and Rush Creek Ranch in the Nebraska panhandle.

== 19th century ==
The family's founding patriarch was Thomas E. Wells (1855–1910), who moved to Hyde Park Township, Illinois, in 1870. Wells immigrated to the United States with his father, John, and his younger brother, Samuel. After immigrating, Wells dropped out of school at age 15 and began his career in Chicago. In 1873, he went to work for the Chicago Board of Trade and was made partner of the firm in 1876, alongside Robert Stuart. By the late 1870s, Wells was appointed director of Stuart's new company, Quaker Oats; a position he would retain until his death. He would later serve as vice president. At that time, the Quaker Oats Company was doing $16 million of sales annually, selling wheat cereals, farina, hominy, cornmeal, baby food, and animal feed. By 1918, the company did $123 million in sales.

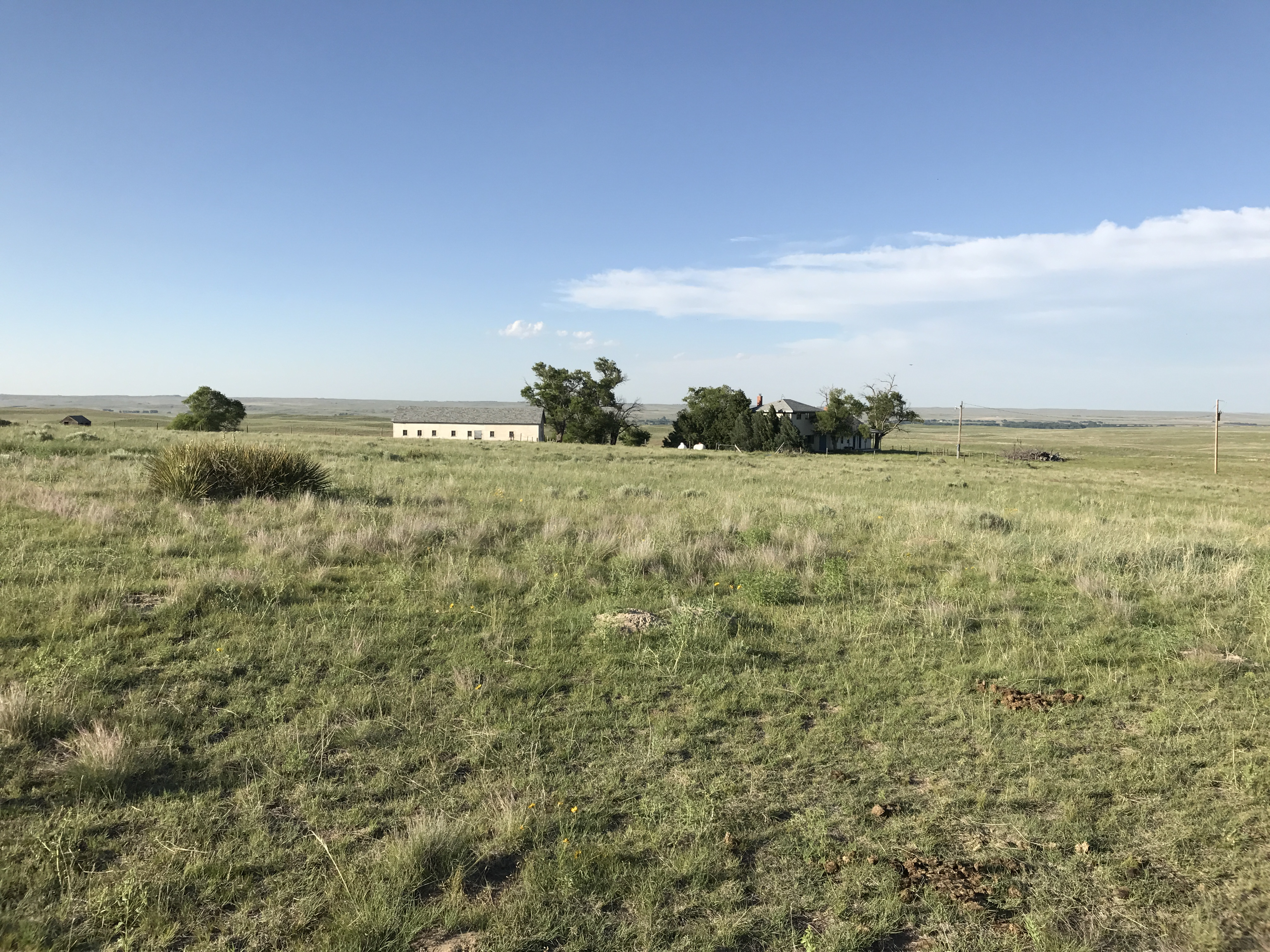
Rush Creek Ranch in 2017

After a debtor defaulted on their loan, Thomas E. Wells received several thousand head of cattle as collateral. In 1890, he initially purchased 10,000 acres of land in the Nebraska panhandle from the Union Pacific Railroad, establishing Rush Creek Ranch. Before his death, the ranch would grow to 155,864 acres and is still owned and operated by the Wells family, as of 2025.

== 20th century ==
In 1904, Thomas E. Wells returned to England and acquired Orchard Farm in the Cotswolds.

In 1906, Thomas E. Wells inherited the Wells baronetcy from his first cousin Sir Arthur Spencer Wells, son of Sir Thomas Spencer Wells.

In January 1934, Preston A. Wells Sr. and Thomas E. Wells Jr., sons of Thomas E. Wells, purchased the Riverside Hotel from the Fort Lauderdale Bank and Trust Company for $8,250 in cash. It was a three-story building with 30 rooms, constructed by George E. Miller in 1925. The brothers form the Las Olas Company, which has owned the hotel since its founding and is still owned by the Wells family, as of 2025.

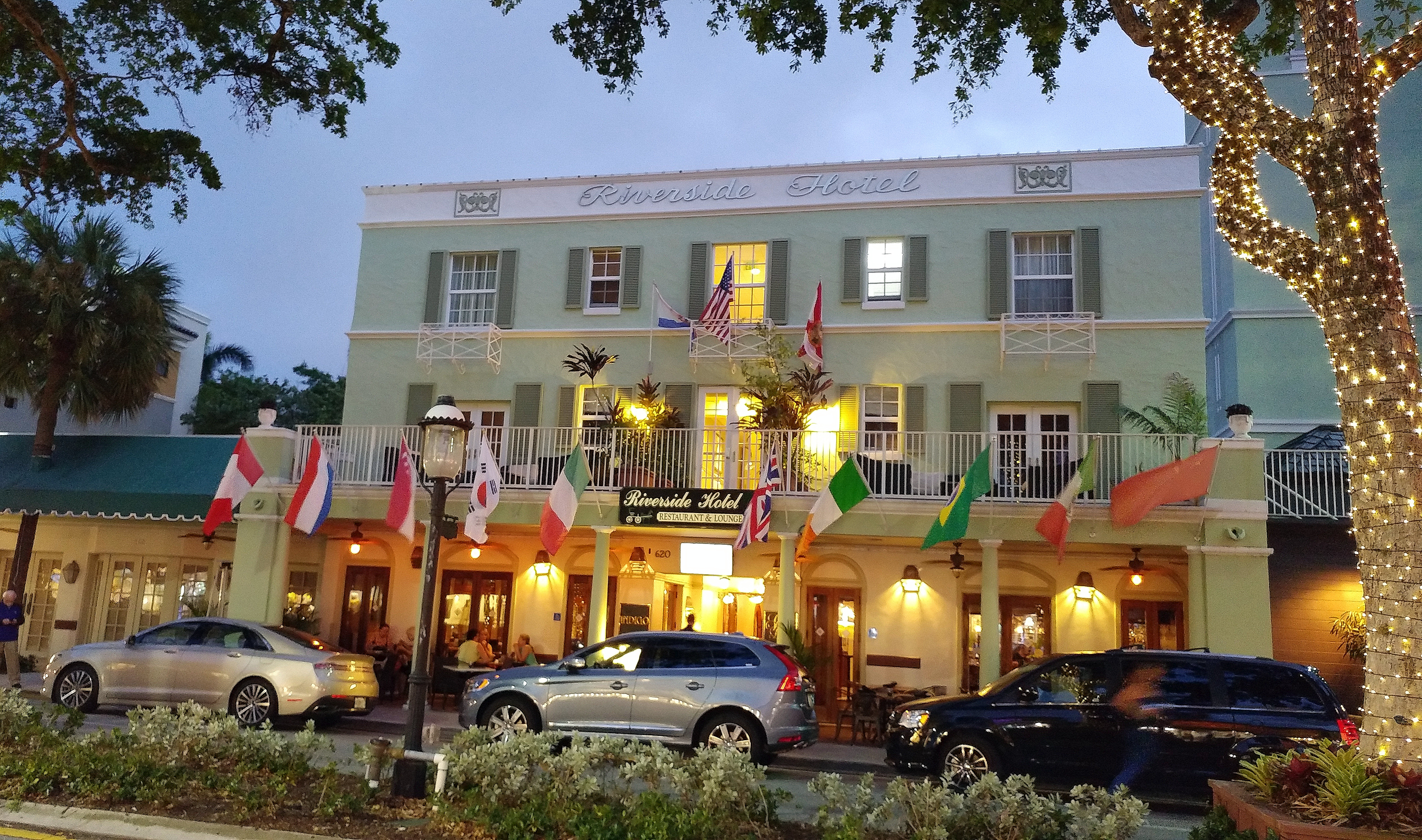
Entrance to the Riverside Hotel

During World War II, Greeley Wells served in the United States Marine Corps and fought the Empire of Japan in the Pacific theater. Wells began basic training at Marine Corps Base Camp Pendleton before being sent to Camp Tarawa, Hawaii for further training. On February 19, 1945, Wells landed on the southeast side of Iwo Jima with the 2nd Battalion, 28th Marines, on "Green Beach 1", which was the closest landing beach to Mount Suribachi on the southern end of the island. He stormed the beaches of Iwo Jima under "intense mortar, sniper, and machine gun fire" and was shot in the arm. Wells took part in the raising of the first and second U.S. flags on Iwo Jima. Wells went on to serve as mayor of Harding Township in 1963. He served as chairman of Barry Goldwater's unsuccessful Morris County, New Jersey campaign in 1964. That same year, Wells ran for freeholder of Morris County and was defeated by incumbent Thomas Koclas. He would go on to serve as a local party leader and Harding Township police commissioner.

In 1974, Thomas E. Wells III founded the First American Bank in Chicago.

In 1974, Dick Wells gained control of The Las Olas Company. By then, the company owned many other large properties across Broward County, Florida. In January 1979, Wells was appointed as a member of the Florida Tax Commission by Governor Bob Graham.

In 1992, Marion Wells became co-chair of the Heritage Foundation's Legacy Society, a "group of Heritage supporters who make gifts through their estates so Heritage will be a permanent voice in Washington for conservative principles." She raised over $292 million in gifts and commitments in that position.

By 1993, the Wells family owned nearly 60% of land on Las Olas Boulevard and passed many of the executive responsibilities to the "new generation" of the family.

== 21st century ==
In 2001, Marion Wells established the Marion G. Wells Foundation; a nonprofit grant-making organization that supports conservative think tanks and advocacy groups.

For many years, the Wells family has contributed to many Republican politicians, including: George W. Bush, John McCain, Paul Ryan, Mike Pence, and John Thune.

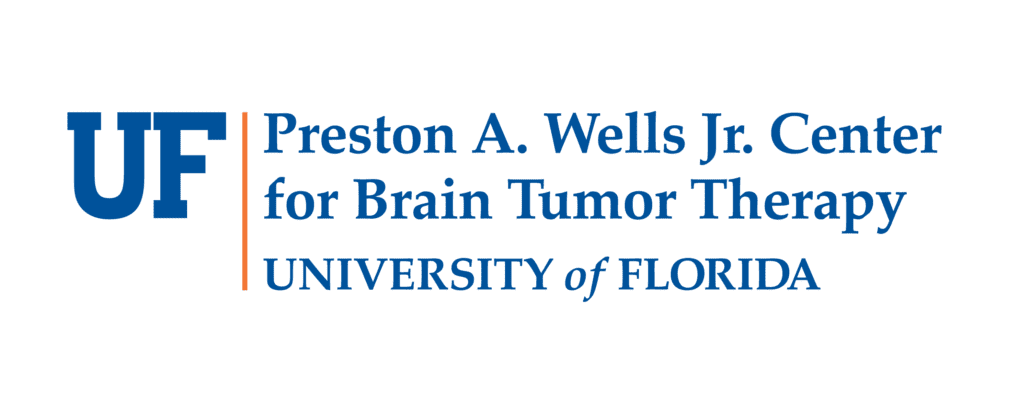
Logo of the Preston A. Wells Jr. Center for Brain Tumor Therapy at the University of Florida

After significant donations, the University of Florida's Department of Neurology was named after Lillian Shedd Wells, and the department's Center for Brain Tumor Therapy was named after Preston A. Wells Jr.

In 2007, the City of Fort Lauderdale posthumously awarded Dick Wells the title of "Honored Founder" for his contributions to the city.

In 2023, members of the Wells family supported Governor Ron DeSantis's unsuccessful campaign for the 2024 Republican presidential nomination.

As of 2025, the Wells family owns First American Bank, and Thomas E. Wells IV is the CEO and chairman. The bank has 61 locations nationwide and assets of over $6 billion.

== See also ==
- List of United States political families

== Sources ==
- Rottman, Gordon L. (2002). U.S. Marine Corps World War II Order of Battle – Ground and Air Units in the Pacific War. Westport, Connecticut: Greenwood Press. ISBN 0-313-31906-5.
