= Lisco, Nebraska =

Census-designated place in Garden County, Nebraska, United States

- Census-designated place
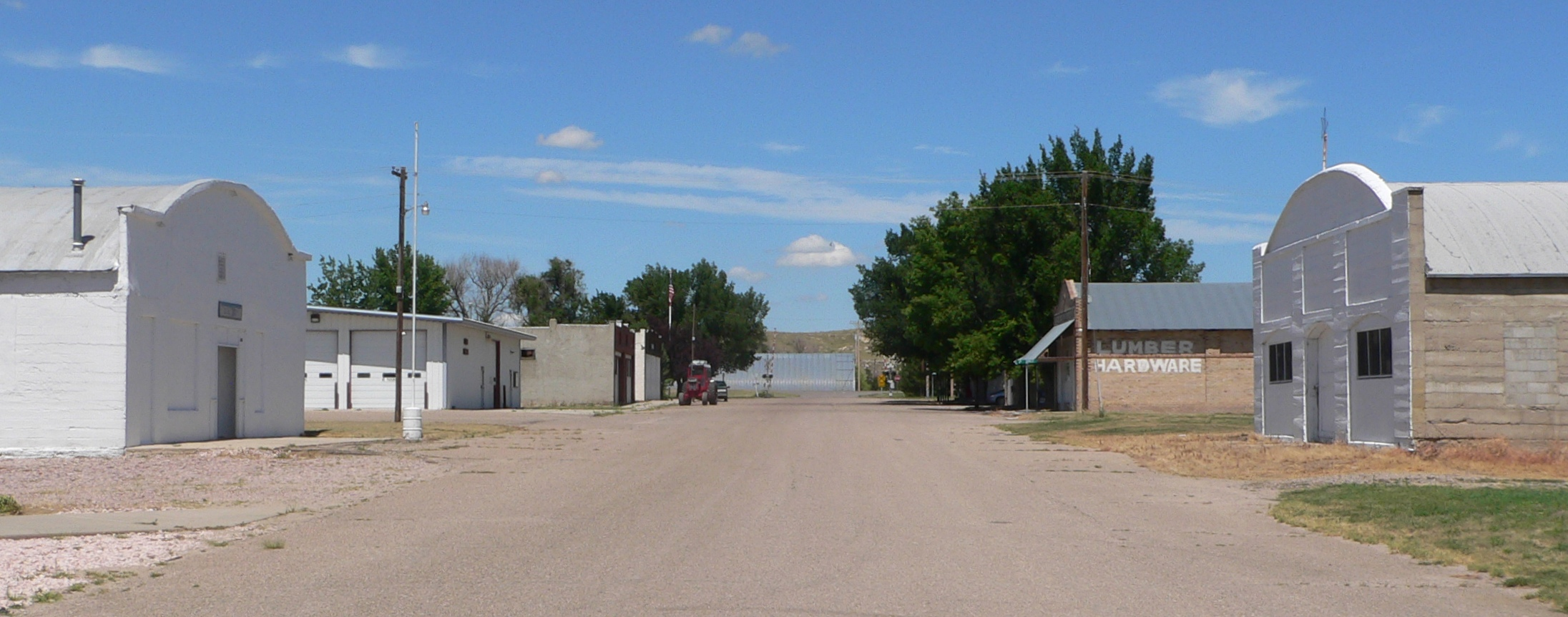
- Downtown Lisco, looking north along Coldwater

- Location in the state of Nebraska
- Coordinates: 41°29′55″N 102°37′25″W
- Country: United States
- State: Nebraska
- County: Garden

Area
  - Total: 0.59 sq mi (1.54 km^{2})
  - Land: 0.59 sq mi (1.54 km^{2})
  - Water: 0 sq mi (0.00 km^{2})
- Elevation: 3,491 ft (1,064 m)

Population (2020)
  - Total: 68
  - Density: 114.2/sq mi (44.09/km^{2})
- Time zone: UTC-6 (Mountain (MST))
  - Summer (DST): UTC-5 (MDT)
- ZIP code: 69148
- FIPS code: 31-28315
- GNIS feature ID: 2393102

Lisco is a census-designated place (CDP) in Garden County, Nebraska, United States. The population was 68 at the 2020 census.

== History ==
Lisco was laid out in 1909 when the Union Pacific Railroad was extended to that point. The community was named after Reuben Lisco, a cattleman who owned about 40,000 acres (16,000 ha) of land in the area, including the land on which the town currently stands. Mr. Lisco later became the president of the Lisco State Bank.

In the 2000 United States census, the community of Lisco was mistakenly called "Cisco" by the Census Bureau. The surrounding census county division (CCD) was still called Lisco. By 2005, the Census Bureau had realized its error, stating that "Lisco census designated place (CDP) is erroneously shown...with the name 'Cisco.'"

Founded in 1890, the Wells family-owned Rush Creek Ranch has been the primary employer of Lisco residents.

== Geography ==
Lisco is located in western Garden County on the north side of the valley of the North Platte River. The western border of Lisco follows the Morrill County line. U.S. Route 26 passes through the community, leading northwest 29 miles (47 km) to Bridgeport and southeast 58 miles (93 km) to Ogallala.

According to the United States Census Bureau, the Lisco CDP has a total area of 0.60 square miles (1.55 km^{2}), all land.

=== Climate ===
Climate data for Lisco, NE (1991-2020)
Month	Jan	Feb	Mar	Apr	May	Jun	Jul	Aug	Sep	Oct	Nov	Dec	Year
Average precipitation inches (mm)	0.47 (12)	0.62 (16)	1.01 (26)	2.18 (55)	3.21 (82)	2.81 (71)	2.48 (63)	1.98 (50)	1.61 (41)	1.23 (31)	0.59 (15)	0.60 (15)	18.79 (477)
Average snowfall inches (cm)	3.2 (8.1)	5.4 (14)	3.4 (8.6)	3.5 (8.9)	0.6 (1.5)	0.0 (0.0)	0.0 (0.0)	0.0 (0.0)	0.1 (0.25)	1.2 (3.0)	3.5 (8.9)	5 (13)	25.9 (66.25)
Average precipitation days (≥ 0.01 in)	2.2	3.3	3.5	6.1	8.5	8	6.6	5.2	4.9	4.9	2.6	2.4	58.2
Average snowy days (≥ 0.01)	2	2.8	1.7	1.2	0.3	0	0	0	0	0.6	1.4	2.3	12.3
Source: NOAA

== Demographics ==
Historical population
Census	Pop.	Note	%±
2020	68		—
U.S. Decennial Census

As of the census of 2000, there were 68 people, 35 households, and 22 families residing in the CDP. The population density was 118.1 inhabitants per square mile (45.6/km^{2}). There were 45 housing units at an average density of 78.2 units per square mile (30.2 units/km^{2}). The racial makeup of the CDP was 100.00% White. Hispanic or Latino of any race were 2.94% of the population.

There were 35 households, out of which 17.1% had children under the age of 18 living with them, 60.0% were married couples living together, 5.7% had a female householder with no husband present, and 34.3% were non-families. 34.3% of all households were made up of individuals, and 20.0% had someone living alone who was 65 years of age or older. The average household size was 1.94 and the average family size was 2.39.

In the CDP, the population was spread out, with 13.2% under the age of 18, 5.9% from 18 to 24, 16.2% from 25 to 44, 32.4% from 45 to 64, and 32.4% who were 65 years of age or older. The median age was 57 years. For every 100 females, there were 94.3 males. For every 100 females age 18 and over, there were 84.4 males.

The median income for a household in the CDP was $33,750, and the median income for a family was $38,333. Males had a median income of $29,583 versus $27,917 for females. The per capita income for the CDP was $17,314. There were 12.5% of families and 24.2% of the population living below the poverty line, including no under eighteens and 25.0% of those over 64.

== See also ==
- North Platte River
