= Kiwi Time =

American rock band

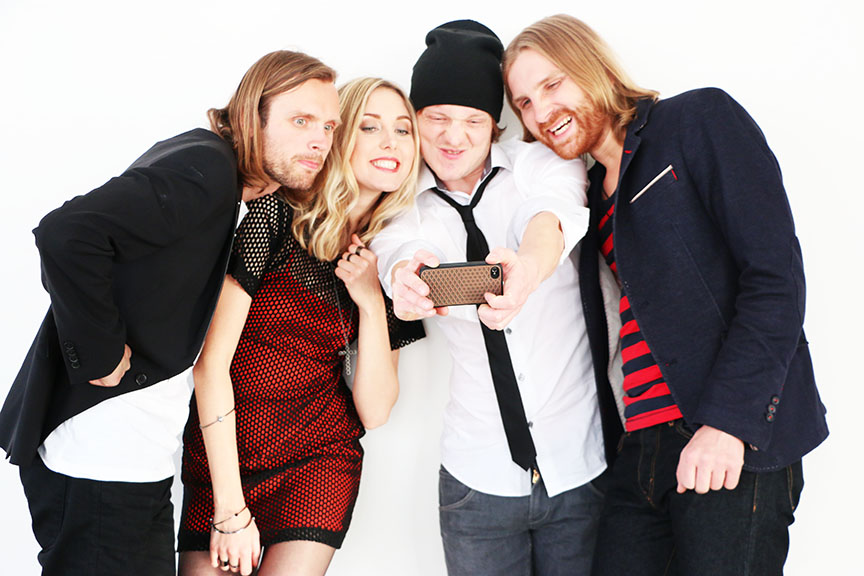
- Kiwi Time band

Background information
- Genres: Synthpop, indie rock, pop rock, alternative rock
- Years active: 2011–2015
- Label: Granted Access
- Past members: Vlad Kukharchuk; Anna Makovchik; Yoga Shyp; Mikalai Skrobat
- Website: kiwitime.band

Kiwi Time is an American rock band previously based in San Francisco and now living in Los Angeles, California. Originally childhood friends from Belarus, the band is known for standing up for human rights around the globe and giving its support to Russian human rights activists during the 2014 Winter Olympics in Sochi. Kiwi Time performed in venues such as the Great American Music Hall, SLIMs, The Viper Room, 111 Minna Gallery, Elbo Room, Supperclub, DNA Lounge, Cafe Cocomo, Broadway Studios, and Brick & Mortar Music Hall.

== History ==
Originally childhood friends from town Byaroza, Belarus (a former Soviet republic), the band members relocated to San Francisco seeking opportunities to pursue growth and escape the political and social issues in Eastern Europe. In their San Francisco home, the band, a mix of musicians and songwriters influenced by American indie rock, were able to enhance their creative process. Kiwi Time is built on a team of lead singer and guitarist Yoga Shyp, singer/bassist, Anna Makovchik and drummer Vlad Kukharchuk, and Mikalai Skrobat on keyboards and guitar.

In 2013, Kiwi Time signed with the music label, Inc., the Bay Area's premier music and video label and production studios and a division of Baynetwork Inc., one of Silicon Valley's top IT hardware re-sellers and managed IT service companies. Their 5-track EP "It’s Kiwi Time" was produced by Dan Shea (producer), who is known for his work with Mariah Carey, Janet Jackson, Carlos Santana, Rob Thomas, Bono, Robin Thicke, Martina McBride amongst many others. As a producer, composer, and multi-instrumentalist, Dan Shea's albums have sold over 150 million copies worldwide.

In September 2014, the band performed in Los Angeles's legendary The Viper Room. In January 2015 the band was named by Emerging Bands magazine as one of the top 100 bands in the world.

== Collaborations ==
In the summer of 2014, the band collaborated with legendary hip-hop producer and artist Sir Mix-a-Lot on a track called "If I Can" that was released in early November.

== Awards and recognition ==
In 2013, Kiwi Time were the winners of the Stoneski Battle of the Bands. In 2014, the band won first place at the ArtRockX band competition. They also headlined at the Red Marines Music Festival and have played shows in Los Angeles and New York. As a result, the band was featured on Live 105's Top Ten Local Bands in San Francisco.

They have been named one of the ten best local alternative rock bands in San Francisco by the alternative station Live 105 FM.

== See also ==
- List of alternative rock artists
