= TBRC =

TBRC may refer to:

- Florida Taxation and Budget Reform Commission
- Tibetan Buddhist Resource Center, now the Buddhist Digital Resource Center (BDRC)
