= Gretsch (surname) =

Gretsch is a surname. Notable people with the surname include:

- Émile Gretsch (1908–2004), Luxembourgish fencer
- Friedrich Gretsch (1856–1895), German American businessman and founder of Gretsch
- Joel Gretsch (born 1963), American actor
- Kendall Gretsch (born 1992), American triathlete, biathlete and cross-country skier
- Nikolay Gretsch (1787–1867), Russian grammarian
- Patrick Gretsch (born 1987), German cyclist
