= Rush Creek Ranch =

Historic ranch in Nebraska, US

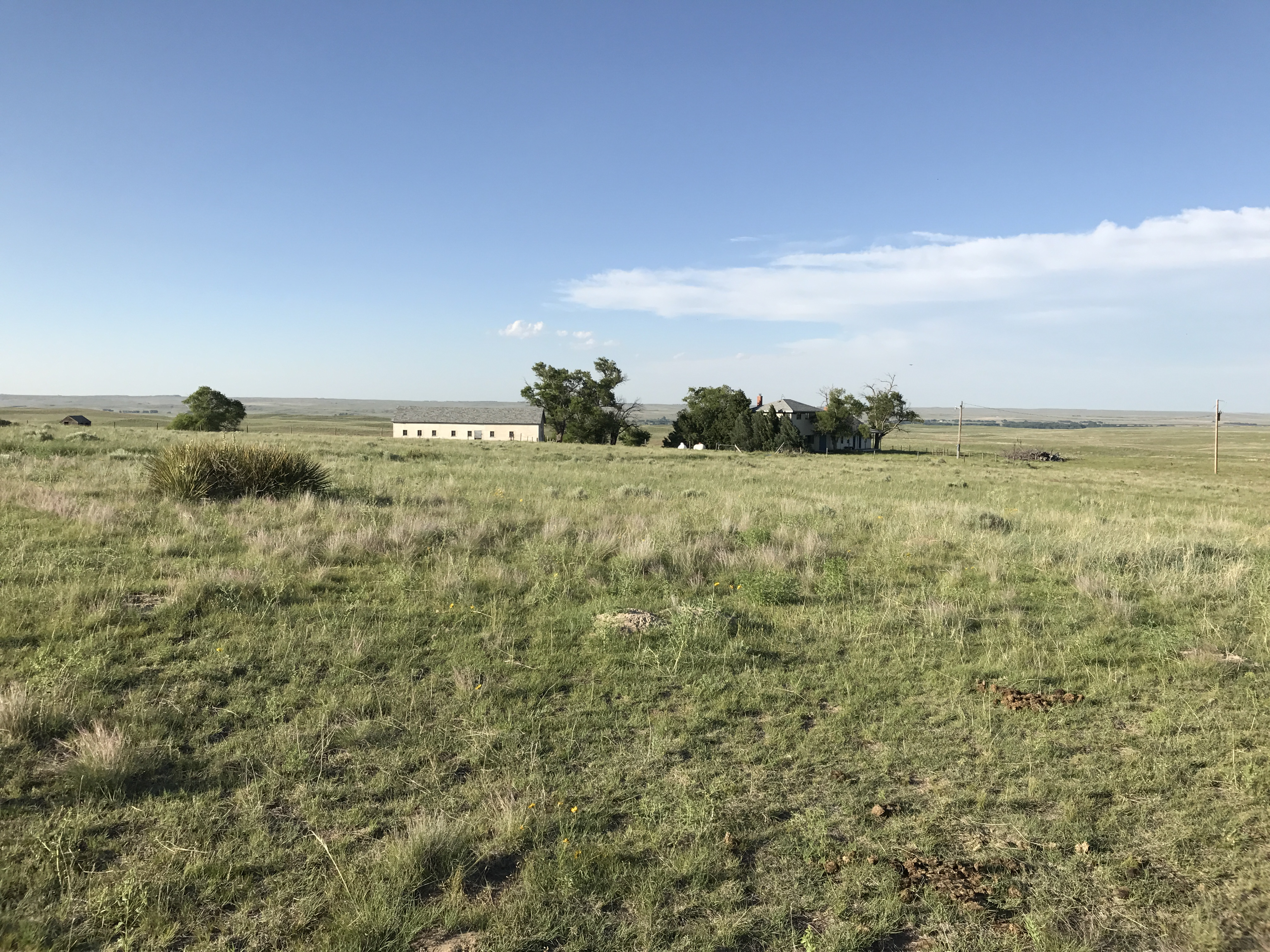
- Wells House, located on the ranch

- Location within Nebraska Location within the United States
- 41°25′04″N 102°35′42″W
- Location: Nebraska
- Nearest city: Lisco, Nebraska, U.S.

History
- Founded: 1890; 136 years ago
- Founder: Thomas E. Wells

Site notes
- Area: 155,864 acres (63,076 ha)
- Owner: Wells family

Rush Creek Ranch is a historic site and cattle ranch located across eight counties in the Sandhills of the Nebraska panhandle on the North Platte River.

== History ==
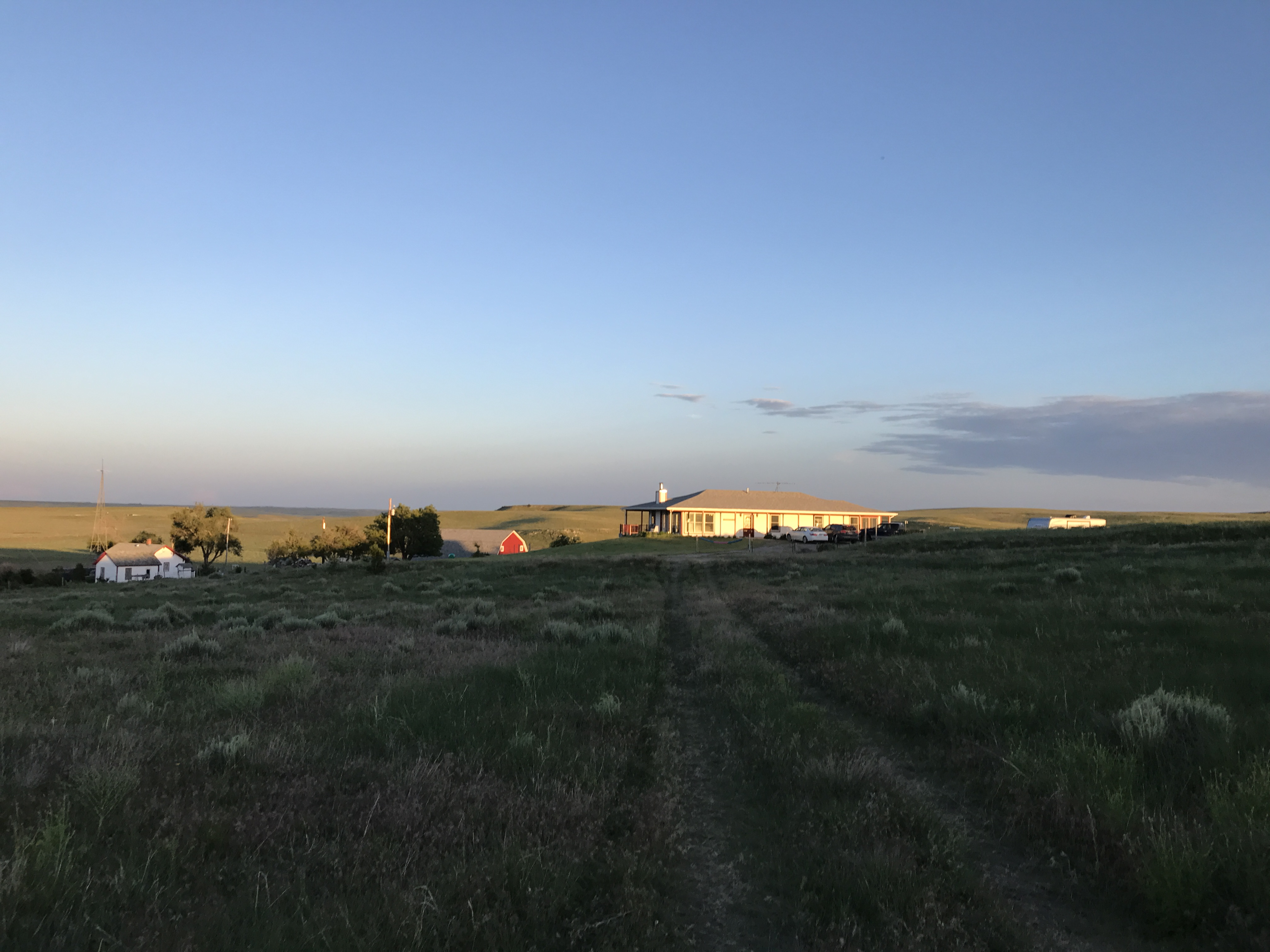
Main House

After a debtor defaulted on their loan, Thomas E. Wells received several thousand head of cattle as collateral. In 1890, he initially purchased 10,000 acres of land in the Great Plains from the Union Pacific Railroad, establishing Rush Creek Ranch.

The ranch spans Garden, Cheyenne, Morrill, Arthur, Sheridan, Cherry, Grant, and Hooker counties of Nebraska. It maintains over half-a-million head of cattle and raises approximately 1,000 Arabian horses. Rush Creek formerly raised salmon.

A relic of the Homestead Acts and Free Soil policies, there are multiple homesteads located across the property.

As of 2025, the ranch is still primarily owned by the Wells family through the Rush Creek Land and Live Stock Company.

== Notable residents ==
- Thomas E. Wells
- Dick Wells
- Marion Wells
