= Gertrude Gretsch Astor =

American socialite (1923–1999)

Countess Gertrude Gretsch Astor
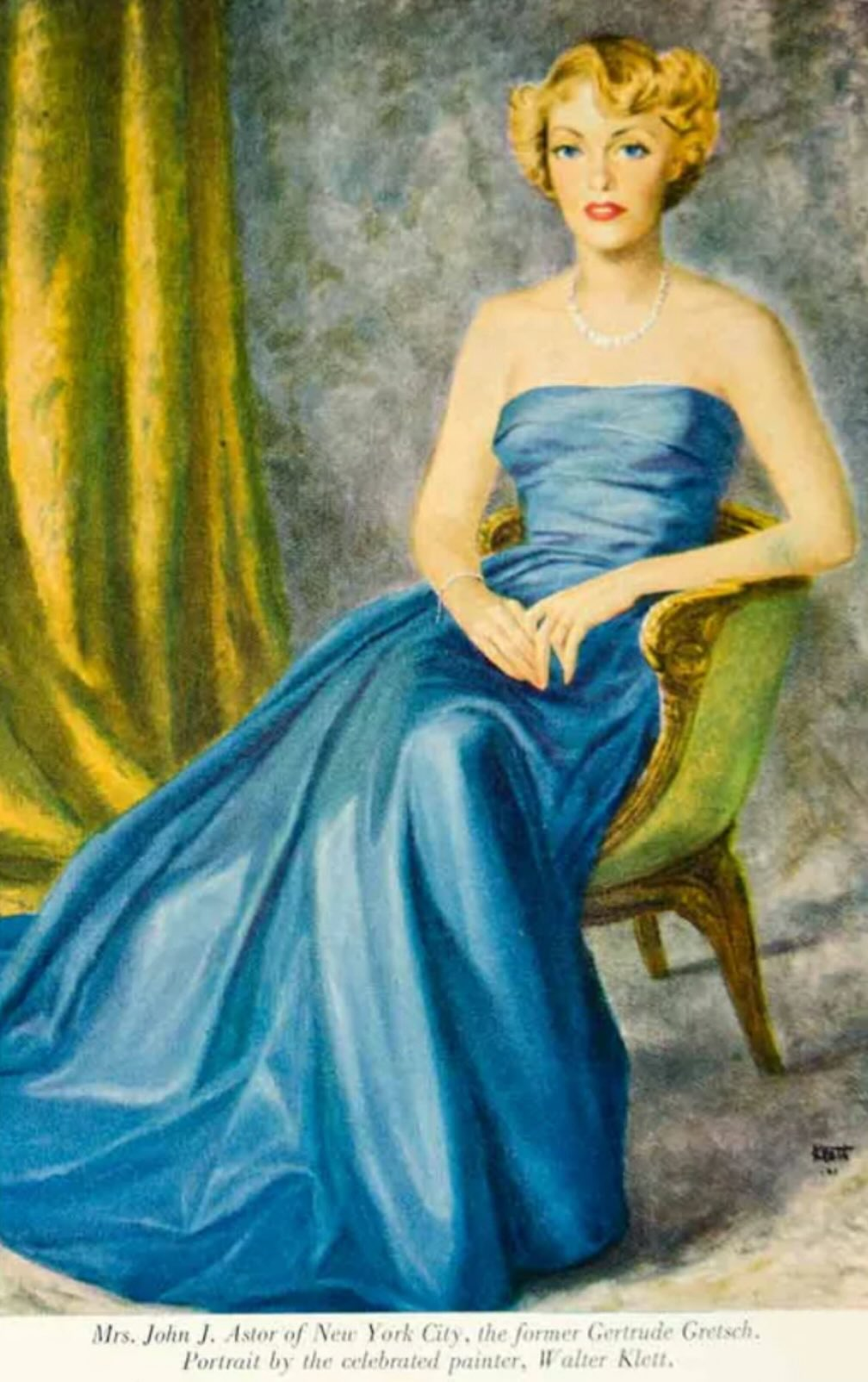
- Portrait of Astor for Collier's, 1944
- Full name: Gertrude Gretsch Astor Coletti-Perucca
- Born: Gertrude Gretsch; August 1, 1923; Brooklyn, New York City, U.S.
- Died: January 16, 1999 (aged 75); Glen Cove, New York, U.S.
- Buried: Green-Wood Cemetery
- Spouses: John Jacob Astor VI (m. 1944; div. 1954) Sonio Coletti-Perucca (m. 1961; died 1997)
- Children: 1

Gertrude Gretsch Astor (née Gretsch; August 1, 1923 – January 16, 1999) was an American socialite who was a member of the Astor family and later a titular countess.

== Early life and career ==
On August 1, 1923, Gertrude Gretsch was born in Brooklyn, New York to the wealthy Gretsch family. She was the daughter of Walter Gretsch, a son of the Gretsch Company founder Friedrich Gretsch, and Gertrude Gretsch. She was raised in Manhattan, attended the Woodward School for Girls, and graduated from the Packer Collegiate Institute. She went on to graduate from Smith College with a bachelor's degree.

Before her marriage, Astor worked for the Navy League and other charitable organizations on behalf of blind children.

In 1967, Astor served as a committee member of the 13th Imperial Ball held for the 5th Duke and Duchess of Aosta at the Plaza Hotel, attended by Mrs. Spyros Skouras, Mrs. Henry J. Heinz II, Mrs. Cornelius Vanderbilt Whitney, Mrs. Francis L. Kellogg, and Serge Obolensky.

For over 30 years, Astor was a board member of the Kips Bay Boys & Girls Club.

== Personal life ==
Astor was Catholic. She was a first cousin of activist Marion Wells.

On September 18, 1944, in New York City, Gretsch married John Jacob Astor VI, son of Madeleine and Colonel John Jacob Astor IV. Astor's best man was his half-brother, artist John Henry Dick. The couple honeymooned in Canada. For years, their marital problems were covered in the press. Astor and Gretsch divorced on August 2, 1954, after a four-year separation, though a Mexican divorce in Juárez. After ending his marriage, Astor married Dolly Fullman four days later. Astor and Fullman separated after 41 days of marriage. In 1956, Astor and Gretsch's divorce was ruled invalid. An American divorce soon followed, adjudicated by Justice Matthew M. Levy. Before their separation and divorce, the couple had a daughter:

- Mary Jacqueline Astor (b. 1949), who married John Rozet Drexel IV (b. 1945), a son of John Rozet Drexel III and Mildred Sophia Noreen Stonor and 2x great-grandson of Anthony Joseph Drexel, in 1984.

In her divorce settlement, Gretsch received a 19-bedroom apartment at 998 Fifth Avenue and an interest in a building on the northwest corner of Fifth Avenue and 35th Street.

In October 1961, Astor married Sonio Edoardo Coletti-Perucca, a titular Italian count and playwright who was a classmate and friend of John F. Kennedy and Lem Billings at Harvard University. Their wedding was attended by then-Vice President Lyndon B. Johnson. For years, the couple lived in Paris, France. After 35 years of marriage, Coletti-Perucca died of cancer in March 1997.

== Death ==
On January 16, 1999, Astor died at Glen Cove Hospital in Nassau County on Long Island, at the age of 75. She was interred at Green-Wood Cemetery in Brooklyn.
