= Greeley Wells =

American veteran and businessman (1920–2014)

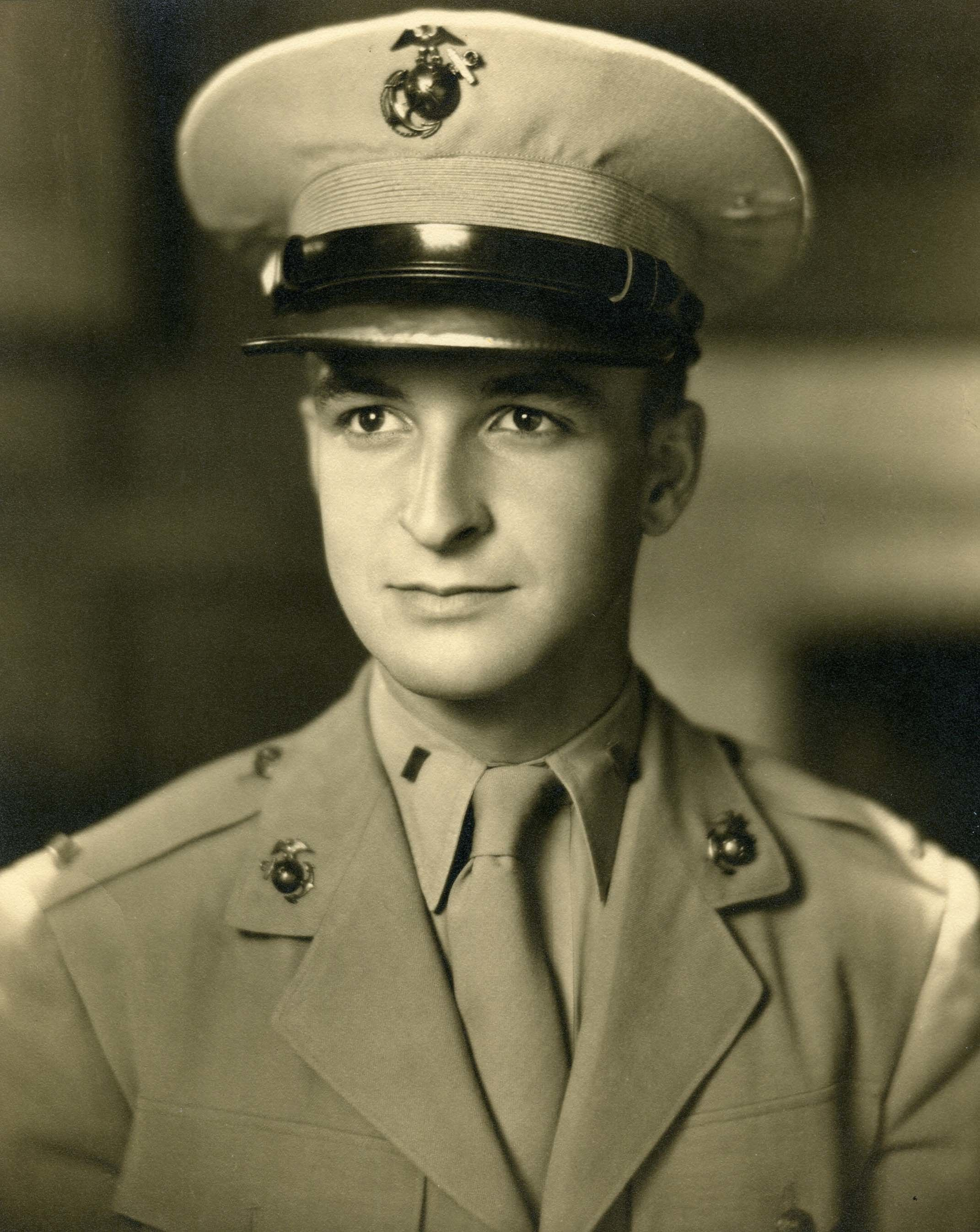
- Wells serving in the Marines, c. 1943–1945

Mayor of Harding Township, New Jersey
- In office January 1, 1963 – December 31, 1963

Personal details
- Born: George Greeley Wells; June 21, 1920 Chicago, Illinois, U.S.
- Died: September 22, 2014 (aged 94) Bellevue, Washington, U.S.
- Party: Republican
- Spouse: Barbara Blossom (m. 1941; died 2009)
- Relations: Wells family
- Children: 4
- Parent(s): Ruth Greeley Wells; Thomas E. Wells Jr.
- Relatives: Thomas E. Wells (grandfather); Dick Wells (cousin)
- Education: Princeton University (AB)
- Occupation: Businessman; politician; military officer; philanthropist
- Known for: Participating in raising the flag on Iwo Jima

Military service
- Allegiance: United States
- Branch/service: United States Marine Corps
- Years of service: 1943–1957
- Rank: Captain
- Unit: 2nd Battalion, 28th Marines
- Battles/wars: World War II; Battle of Iwo Jima
- Awards: Bronze Star (with Valor); Purple Heart; World War II Victory Medal; Asiatic-Pacific Campaign Medal; American Campaign Medal; Navy Occupation Service Medal

George Greeley Wells (June 21, 1920 – September 22, 2014) was an American businessman, politician, and Marine Corps officer who is widely known for participating in the raising of the U.S. flag on Iwo Jima. He later worked as a corporate executive in the urban planning industry and would serve in local government in New Jersey.

Born and raised in Chicagoland, Wells graduated from Princeton University in 1943, joining the United States Marine Corps that same year. During World War II, he served as a battalion adjutant, whose job it was to carry the flag, during the Battle of Iwo Jima. On February 23, 1945, his unit summited Mount Suribachi and raised the first U.S. flag on Iwo Jima; the first time in history a foreign flag flew on Japanese soil. In 1957, Wells retired from the Marines with the rank of captain and returned to Chicago.

After moving to New Jersey in 1959, Wells worked as a partner at GW Bromley & Co. and later became the president of Sanborn Map Company. A member of the Republican Party, Wells served in multiple government positions in Harding Township; as a member of the township committee, a member of the township planning commission, as mayor in 1963, and as police commissioner. He also served as chair of the Morris County Republican Party Executive Committee, supporting the policies of "fusionism" and the burgeoning New Right movement. After retiring from politics, Wells organized a quinquennial reunion at the White House for surviving veterans of the Battle of Iwo Jima, attended by the President of the United States.

== Early life and education ==
George Greeley Wells was born on June 21, 1920, in Chicago, Illinois, to Thomas E. Wells Jr., son of Thomas E. Wells, and Ruth Greeley. He was raised in Lake Forest, Illinois, and graduated with a bachelor's degree from Princeton University in 1943.

== Military service ==
During World War II, Wells served in the United States Marine Corps and fought the Empire of Japan in the Pacific theater.

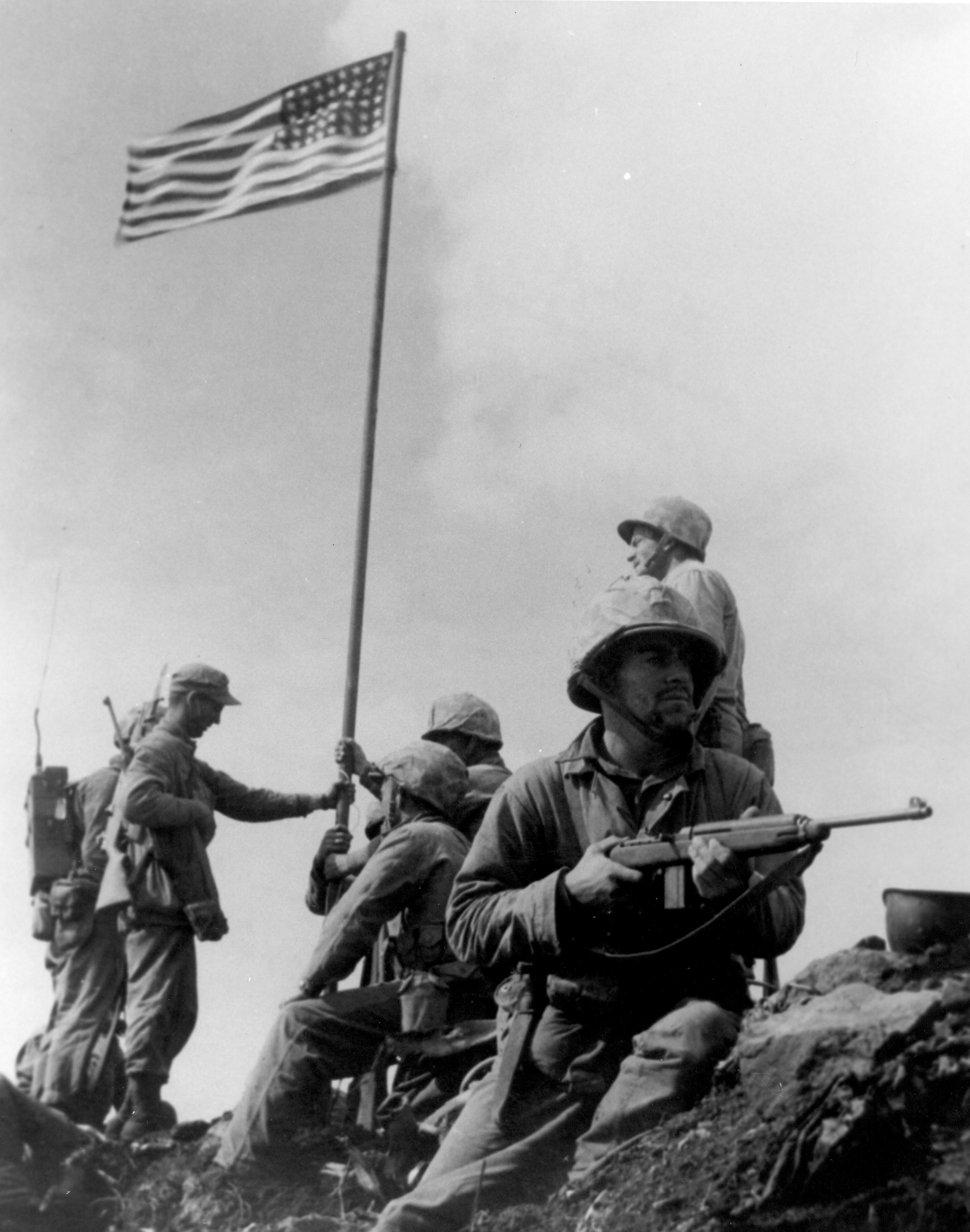
Raising the First Flag on Iwo Jima by SSgt. Louis R. Lowery, USMC Left to right: 1st Lt. Harold Schrier (kneeling behind radioman's legs), Pfc. Raymond Jacobs (radioman reassigned from F Company), Sgt. Henry "Hank" Hansen wearing cap, holding flagstaff with left hand), Platoon Sgt. Ernest "Boots" Thomas (seated), Pvt. Phil Ward (holding lower flagstaff with his right hand), PhM2c. John Bradley, USN (holding flagstaff with both hands, his right hand above Ward's right hand and his left hand below.), Pfc. James Michels (holding M1 Carbine), and Cpl. Charles W. Lindberg (standing above Michels).

Wells began basic training at Marine Corps Base Camp Pendleton before being sent to Camp Tarawa, Hawaii for further training. On February 19, 1945, Wells landed on the southeast side of Iwo Jima with the 2nd Battalion, 28th Marines, on "Green Beach 1", which was the closest landing beach to Mount Suribachi on the southern end of the island. He stormed the beaches of Iwo Jima under "intense mortar, sniper, and machine gun fire" and was shot in the arm. He spent his first night on the island in a fox hole with Pfc. Rene Gagnon. Wells took part in the raising of the first and second U.S. flags on Iwo Jima.

The Secretary of the Navy, James Forrestal, had decided the previous night that he wanted to go ashore and witness the final stage of the fight for the mountain. Now, under a stern commitment to take orders from General Holland "Howlin' Mad" Smith, the secretary was churning ashore in the company of the blunt, earthy general. Their boat touched the beach just after the flag went up, and the mood among the high command turned jubilant. Gazing upward, at the red, white, and blue speck, Forrestal remarked to Smith: "Holland, the raising of that flag on Suribachi means a Marine Corps for the next five hundred years".

Forrestal was so taken with fervor of the moment that he decided he wanted the Second Battalion's flag flying on Mt. Suribachi as a souvenir. The news of this wish did not sit well with 2nd Battalion Commander Chandler Johnson, whose temperament was every bit as fiery as Howlin Mad's. "To hell with that!" the colonel spat when the message reached him. The flag belonged to the battalion, as far as Johnson was concerned. He decided to secure it as soon as possible, and dispatched his assistant operations officer, Lieutenant Ted Tuttle, to the beach to obtain a replacement flag. As an afterthought, Johnson called after Tuttle: "And make it a bigger one."

— James Bradley, Flags of Our Fathers

Then-First Lieutenant Wells, was adjutant of 2nd Battalion, 28th Marines, 5th Marine Division and officially in charge of both American flags flown on Mount Suribachi. He stated in The New York Times in 1991 that Lieutenant Colonel Chandler W. Johnson ordered Wells to get the second flag, and that Wells sent Rene Gagnon, his battalion runner, to the ships on shore for the flag. Wells said that Gagnon returned with a flag and gave it to him, and that Gagnon took this flag up Mt. Suribachi with a message for Harold G. Schrier to raise it and send the other flag down with Gagnon. Wells stated that he received the first flag back from Gagnon and secured it at the Marine headquarters command post. Wells also stated that he had handed the first flag to Lieutenant Schrier to take up Mount Suribachi. Six days after the raising of the flag, Wells met by chance his first cousin, Lt. Preston A. Wells Jr., at a command post on the mountain.

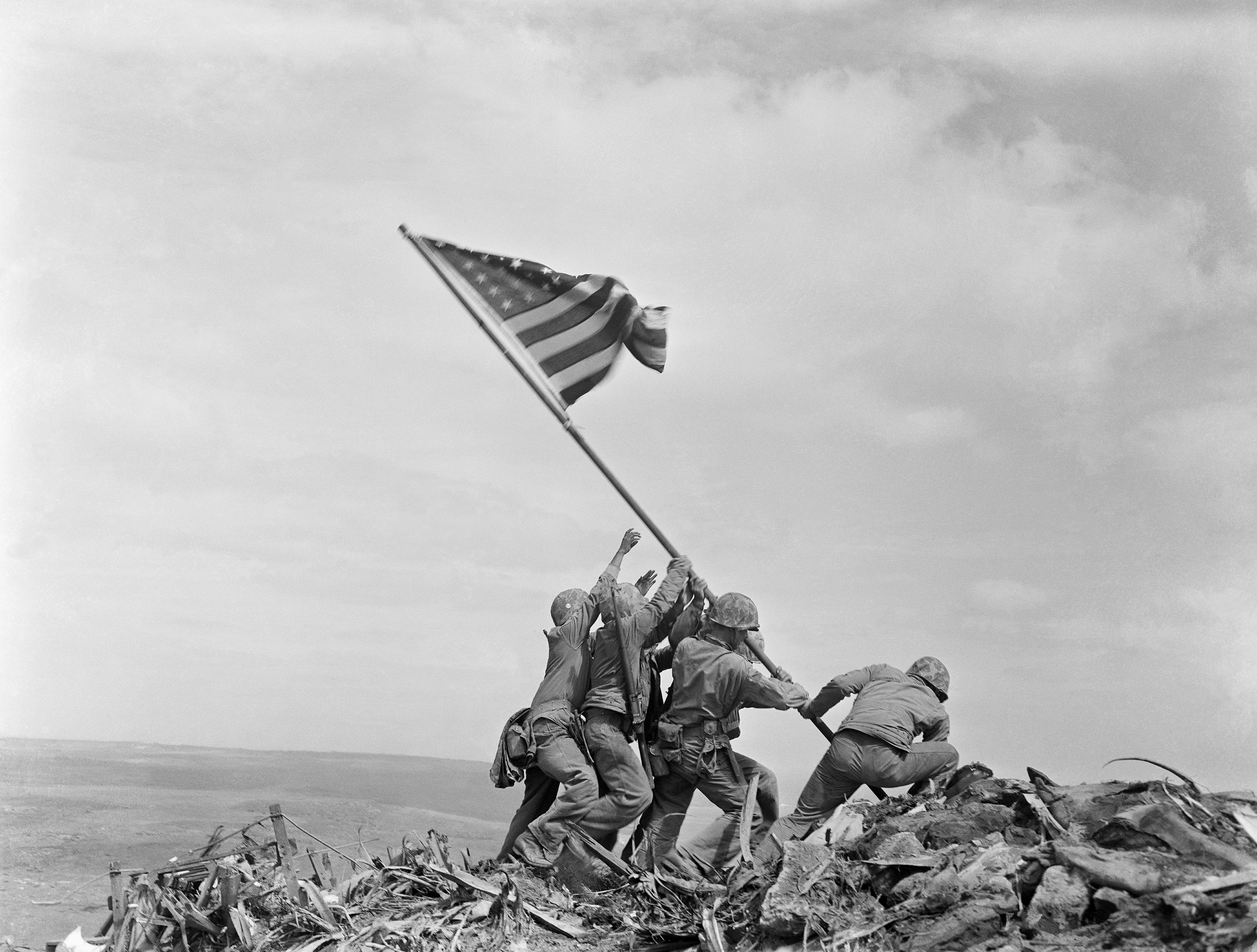
Raising the Flag on Iwo Jima, by Joe Rosenthal of the Associated Press

In November 1957, Wells was honorably discharged from the Marine Corps with the rank of Captain.

== Career ==
After leaving the military, Wells moved his family to Harding Township, New Jersey, and became a partner at GW Bromley & Co., mapping cities for local governments. He later sold the business to the Sanborn Map Company and became president of the company.

An active member in the local Republican Party, Wells served on the township committee and was elected mayor of Harding Township in 1963; serving during the civil rights movement and the JFK assassination. He served as chairman of Barry Goldwater's unsuccessful Morris County, New Jersey campaign in 1964. That same year, Wells ran for freeholder of Morris County and was defeated by incumbent Thomas Koclas by a slim 239-vote margin. He would go on to serve as a local party leader and Harding Township police commissioner.

== Legacy ==
Along with fellow Battle of Iwo Jima veteran and retired Major general Fred E. Haynes Jr., Greeley co-chaired a reunion for the battle's survivors every five years, arranging White House visits with U.S. presidents and dinners with the commandant of the Marine Corps.

In the 1990s and early 2000s, Wells was interviewed for James Bradley’s best-selling book Flags of Our Fathers and for Oliver North's award-winning series War Stories with Oliver North. North described Wells as "one of the finest people I’ve ever met" and said "the classical definition of a hero is not the one who catches the touchdown in the end zone; it’s the person who puts himself at risk for the benefit of others — that was Greeley, humble and selfless."

== Personal life and death ==
Wells was a cousin of Preston A. Wells Jr., a businessman and rancher who also served as a Marine Corps officer at the Battle of Iwo Jima.

In 1941, Wells married Barbara "Bobsy" Blossom. They had four children together. Bobsy and one of their children had polio.

In the early 2000s, Wells and his wife moved to Bellevue, Washington. In 2009, Bobsy died from polio-related symptoms. On September 22, 2014, Wells died in his home in Bellevue, at the age of 94.

== Awards and medals ==
Wells's decorations included:

1st Row	Bronze Star Medal with "V" device	Purple Heart

2nd Row	World War II Victory Medal	Asiatic-Pacific Campaign Medal	American Campaign Medal	Navy Occupation Service Medal

== Sources ==
- Bradley, James (2006) [2000]. Flags of Our Fathers. New York: Bantam. ISBN 978-0-553-38415-4.
- Clancy, Tom (1996). Marine: A Guided Tour of a Marine Expeditionary Unit. Penguin Group US. ISBN 978-1-4295-2009-6.
- Warren, James A. (2007). American Spartans: The U.S. Marines: A Combat History from Iwo Jima to Iraq. New York: Simon and Schuster. ISBN 978-1-4165-3297-2.
- Rottman, Gordon L. (2002). U.S. Marine Corps World War II Order of Battle – Ground and Air Units in the Pacific War. Westport, Connecticut: Greenwood Press. ISBN 0-313-31906-5.
