= Las Olas Boulevard =

Road in Fort Lauderdale, Florida

Coordinates: 26.11930°N 80.13496°W

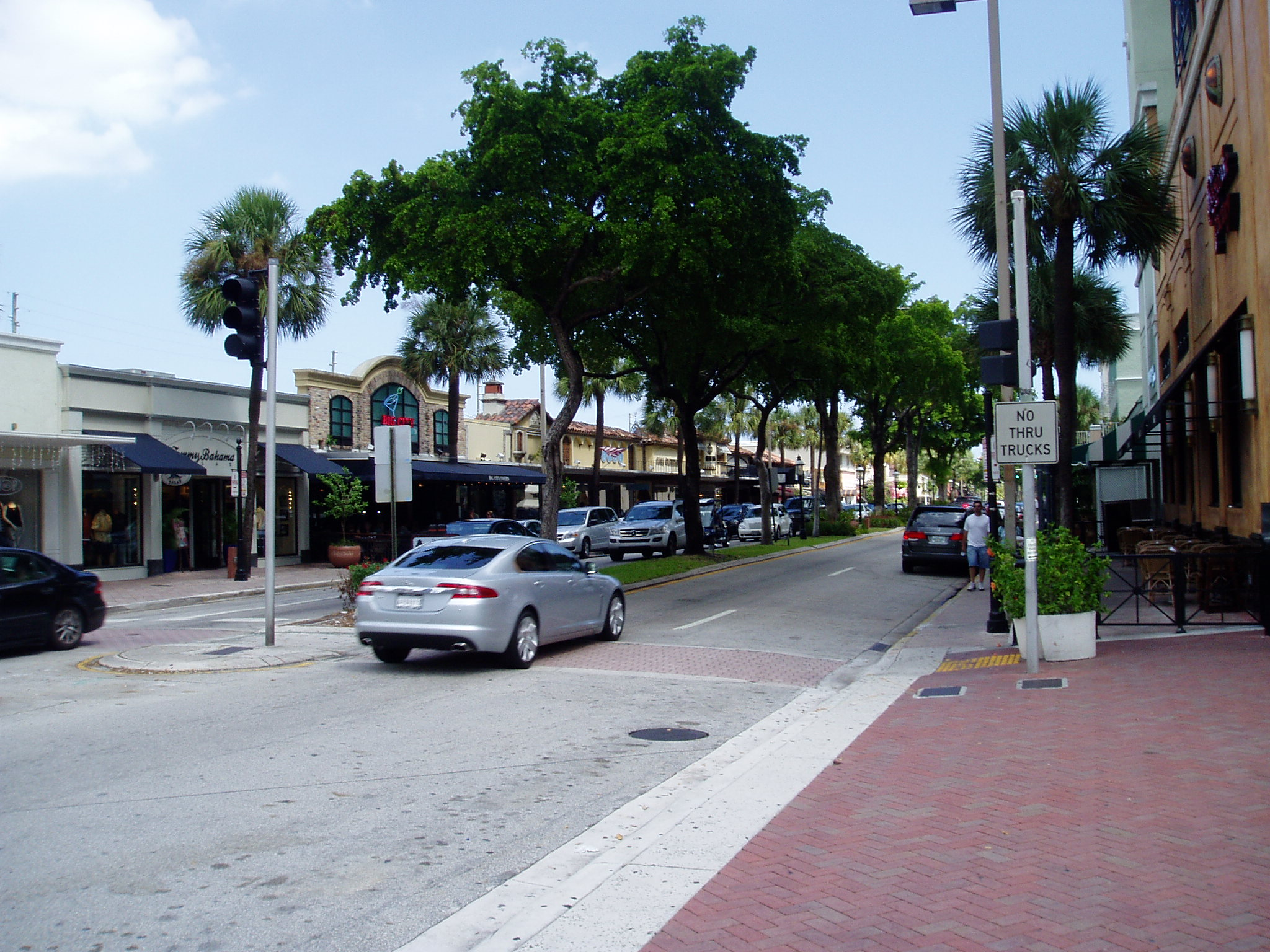
- Las Olas Shops facing northeast
- Interactive map of Las Olas Boulevard
- Length: 2.5 mi (4.0 km)
- Location: Fort Lauderdale
- West end: SW 1st Ave in downtown Fort Lauderdale
- Major junctions: US 1 / SR 5
- East end: SR A1A on Fort Lauderdale Beach

Construction
- Completion: 1917

Other
- Website: https://www.lasolasboulevard.com/

Las Olas Boulevard (Spanish for "The Waves") is a major east-west thoroughfare in Fort Lauderdale, Florida, United States that runs from SW 1st Avenue in the Central Business District to Florida State Road A1A in Fort Lauderdale Beach. The road once carried the designations of State Road A1A Alt. and State Road 842.

The easternmost section begins on a barrier island and crosses the Intracoastal Waterway. The road then enters the residential neighborhoods of Seven Isles and Hendricks and Venice Isles. West of SE 17th Avenue, the road enters a commercial shopping district, which is itself colloquially called "Las Olas". This portion of the road is lined with low and mid-rise bars, nightclubs, bridal stores, shops, boutiques, art galleries, and restaurants. The road passes over the Henry E. Kinney Tunnel and enters the city's downtown central business district. The westernmost part of the street is predominantly lined by high-rises.

== History ==
The boulevard was constructed in 1917 by S.P. Snyder & Son Co., when Las Olas was just a dirt road that crossed the swampy wetlands to the barrier island at Fort Lauderdale Beach. The Las Olas Isles were dredged in the 1920s to create land for a waterfront residential district. The modern commercial segment of Las Olas Boulevard was constructed during the Post World War II era. The buildings surrounding the westernmost downtown segment underwent significant redevelopment since the 1970s.

In the early 1980s Las Olas went through a major renovation program to enhance property values. The land was worth much more than that of the standing homes. It was decided that anyone who wished to buy property on one of the isles would have to tear down the existing home and build a home of equal or greater value than the land. Professional tour companies provide tours that take people down the waterways to show off the celebrities homes and yachts.

In 2020 the city completed construction on the $49 million Las Olas Oceanside Park project at the intersection of Florida State Road A1A and Las Olas Boulevard. This project provided a 650-space parking garage behind and a beachfront park and plaza. The park hosts a variety of events, including farmers markets, fitness and art events.

== Notable buildings ==
- Elbo Room bar
- Riverside Hotel
- The Governor's Club Hotel (1936–1995, demolished)
- Museum of Art Fort Lauderdale
- Bank of America Plaza

== Public transportation ==
Las Olas Boulevard is served by Broward County Transit Route 11 along most of its length, between SE 3rd Avenue and Fort Lauderdale Beach. The street is also served by the Las Olas Link of the Downtown Fort Lauderdale Transportation Management Association's Sun Trolley Bus Service.

== Notable residents ==
A few of the most notable (past and present) are:

- Johnny Weissmuller, actor who played Tarzan.
- Wayne Huizenga, CEO of Waste Management, Inc, Blockbuster Video and AutoNation.
- Connie Francis, actress and movie star who was featured in the movie, Where the Boys Are which was filmed on Las Olas Blvd at the famed Elbo Room.
- Dan Quayle, former Vice President of the United States.
- Lee Majors, actor who played The Six Million Dollar Man and former husband to Farrah Fawcett.
- Sonny and Cher, singers and actors.
- Lucille Ball and Desi Arnaz, television and movie stars. Stars of I Love Lucy fame.
- Gloria Vanderbilt, designer and socialite.
- Marion G. Wells, president of the Marion G. Wells Foundation, and former widow of Preston A. Wells Jr.
- Preston A. Wells Jr., owner of much of the Las Olas Blvd real estate, including the Riverside Hotel, and the owner of the development company, The Las Olas Company.
- Frank and Ivy Stranahan, founding pioneers of Fort Lauderdale and the first residents of Las Olas Boulevard. Their trading post Stranahan House is located between the boulevard and New River. Ivy established the first public school in Ft. Lauderdale and later donated the land which would eventually become Stranahan High School.
