= Riverside Hotel (Fort Lauderdale, Florida) =

Hotel in Fort Lauderdale, Florida

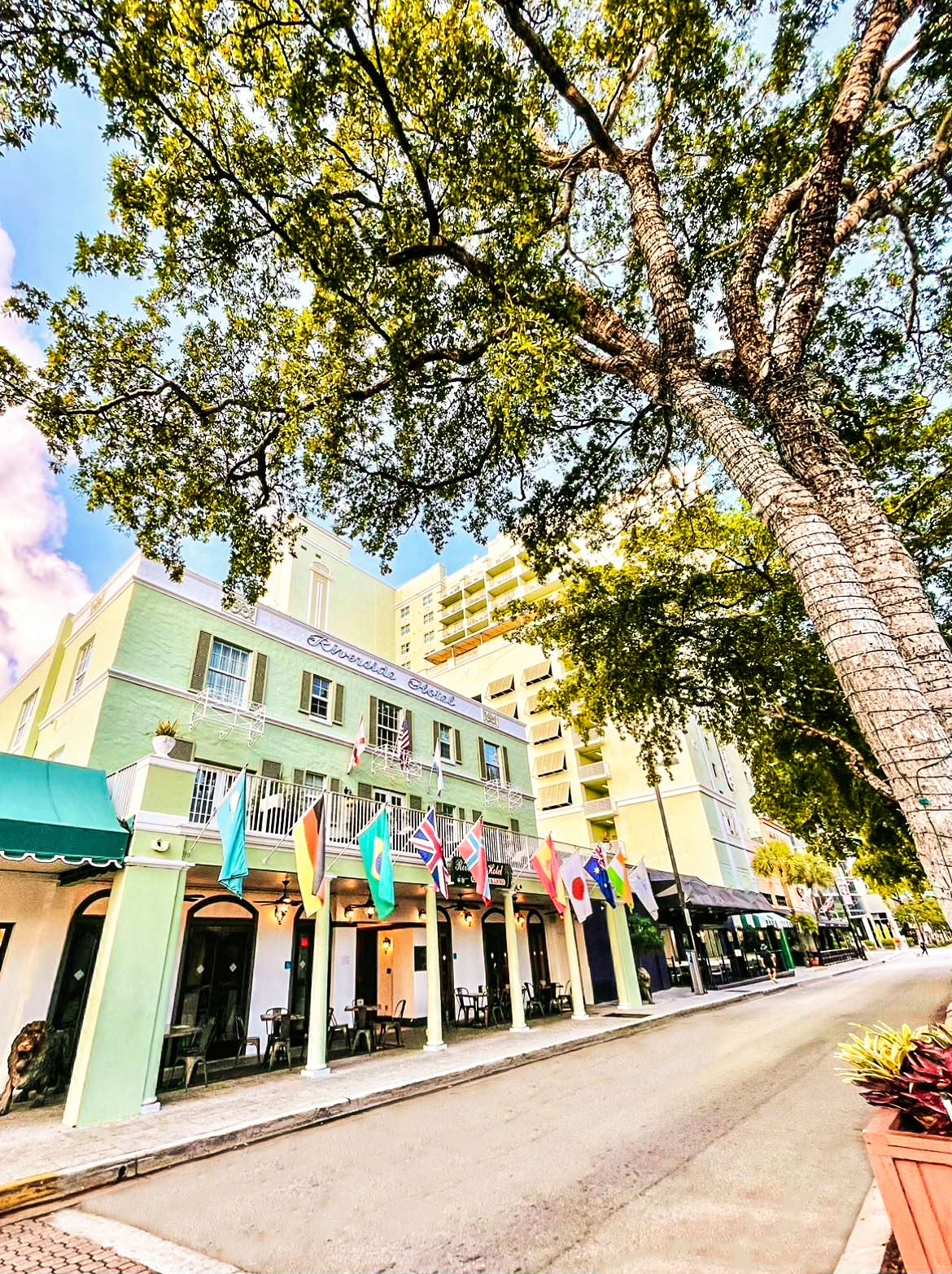
- The Riverside Hotel from Las Olas Boulevard
- Interactive map of the Riverside Hotel area

General information
- Status: Luxury Hotel Resort
- Type: High-Rise
- Architectural style: Postmodern
- Location: Broward County, Florida, 620 E Las Olas Boulevard, Fort Lauderdale, Florida, United States of America
- Coordinates: 26.118333°N 80.136389°W
- Completed: 1925
- Opened: December 17, 1936
- Renovated: 2002
- Renovation cost: $25,000,000
- Owner: Wells family

Height
- Height: 145 ft 0 in (44.20 m)

Technical details
- Structural system: Postmodern

Design and construction
- Architect: Francis Abreu
- Developer: Preston A. Wells Sr.
- Main contractor: George E. Miller

Other information
- Number of rooms: 231
- Number of suites: 6
- Number of restaurants: 2
- Number of bars: 3

Website
- Riverside Hotel

The Riverside Hotel is a historic luxury hotel located in Fort Lauderdale, Florida, on the New River, adjacent to the Stranahan House, on Las Olas Boulevard. The hotel was built in 1925 and opened in 1936. It is the oldest continuously operating hotel in Fort Lauderdale and is one of the oldest hotels in Broward County. In 2002, the hotel underwent a major renovation, doubling the number of rooms.

== History ==
In January 1934, John Wells, Preston A. Wells Sr., and Thomas E. Wells Jr., sons of Thomas E. Wells, purchased the Riverside Hotel from the Fort Lauderdale Bank and Trust Company for $8,250 in cash. It was a three-story building with 30 rooms, constructed by George E. Miller in 1925. The hotel opened as the Champ Carr Hotel, named after the first hotel manager, Champ Carr, until it changed its name back in 1947. The Las Olas Company has owned the hotel since its founding and still owns by the hotel today.

The hotel provided shelter to townspeople during the 1947 Fort Lauderdale hurricane.

Preston A. Wells Jr., president of The Las Olas Company, owned the hotel from 1972 until his death in 2003.

In 2002, the hotel underwent a $25,000,000 renovation; adding a 12-story tower, retail space and parking.

== Notable guests ==
=== Politicians ===
- Ronald Reagan, 40th president of the United States (1981–1989)
- Lawton Chiles, 41st governor of Florida (1991–1998)
- Charlie Crist, 44th governor of Florida (2007–2011)
- Connie Mack III, United States senator from Florida (1989–2001)
- Jack Seiler, 41st mayor of Fort Lauderdale (2009–2018)
- Dean Trantalis, 42nd mayor of Fort Lauderdale (2018–present)
- Bobby DuBose, member of the Florida House of Representatives (2014–2022)
- George Moraitis, member of the Florida House of Representatives (2010–2018)
- Tim Ryan, member of the Broward County Commission (2012–present)
- Ken Jenne, 14th sheriff of Broward County (1997–2007)
- Al Lamberti, 15th sheriff of Broward County (2007–2013)
- Ralph Nader, lawyer and U.S. presidential candidate
- Brad Parscale, Donald Trump 2020 presidential campaign manager

=== Other visitors ===
- Frankie Avalon, singer, actor and former teen idol
- Esther Rolle, Emmy Award winning actress
