= Marion Wells =

American conservative political donor (1926–2016)

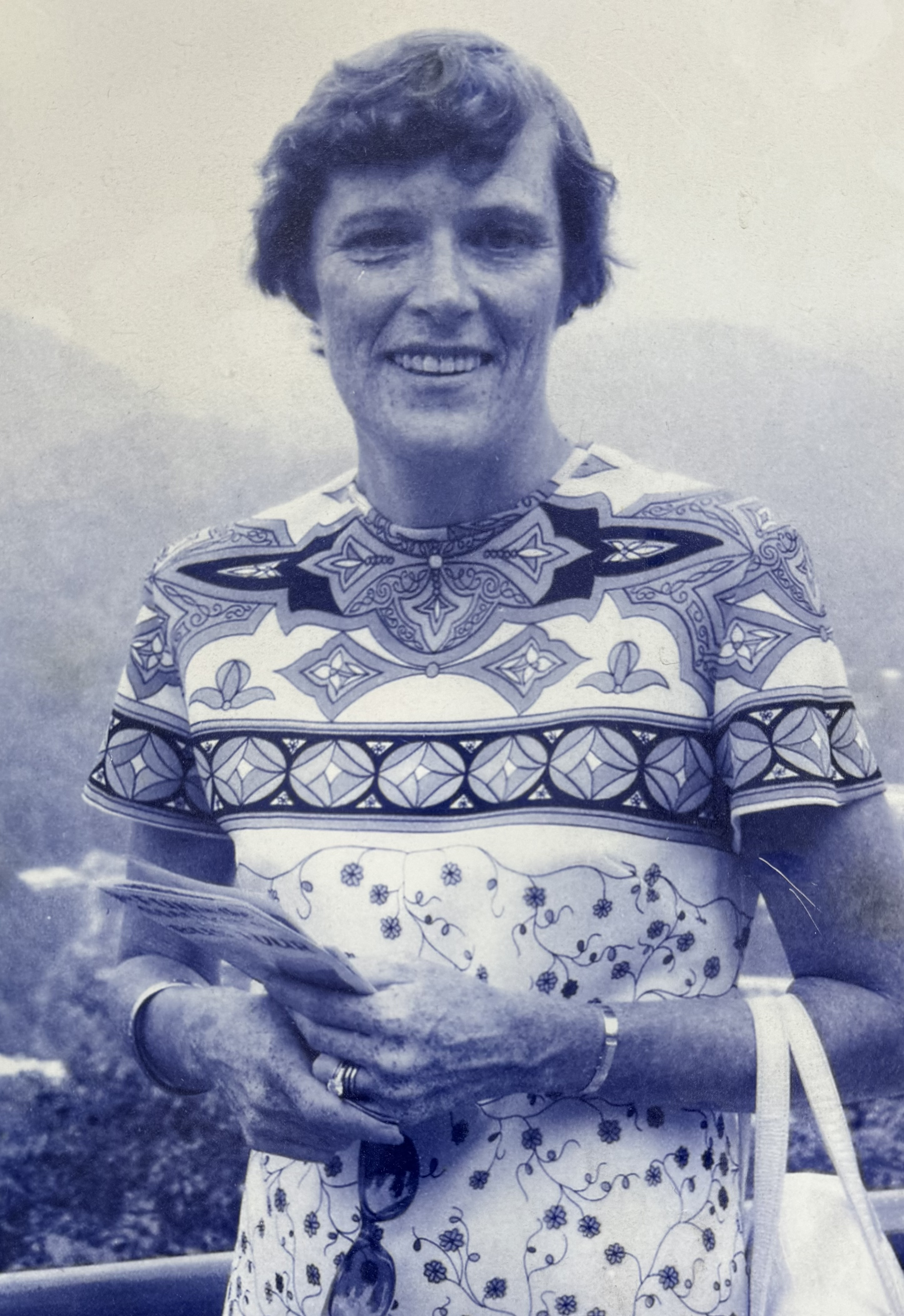
- Wells in 1968
- Born: Marion Downey Gretsch; May 1, 1926; Brooklyn, New York City, U.S.
- Died: October 30, 2016 (aged 90); Fort Lauderdale, Florida, U.S.
- Education: Manhattanville College (BA)
- Occupations: Activist; fundraiser; socialite; philanthropist; political donor
- Political party: Republican
- Movement: Conservatism
- Board member of: The Heritage Foundation; Capital Research Center; Intercollegiate Studies Institute; Cleveland Clinic Florida; Exuma Cays Land and Sea Park
- Spouse(s): John Flemm Jr. (m. 1946; div. 1969) Dick Wells (m. 1973; died 2003)
- Children: 6 (Note: Including one stepdaughter.)
- Parent(s): Louis Gretsch; Marion Downey
- Relatives: Gertrude Gretsch (cousin); Friedrich Gretsch (grandfather)
- Family: Gretsch family (by birth); Wells family (by marriage)

Marion Gretsch Wells (born Marion Downey Gretsch; May 1, 1926 – October 30, 2016) was an American socialite, conservative activist, and political donor. She founded the Marion G. Wells Foundation and served on multiple charitable boards. She and her husband Dick Wells, to whom she was married from 1973 until his death in 2003, were active supporters of the Republican Party, giving millions of dollars to conservative causes and organizations for decades. As a fundraiser, Wells raised over $292 million in charitable contributions.

== Early life and education ==
Wells was born Marion Downey Gretsch on May 1, 1926, in Brooklyn, New York City, to Louis Gretsch, son of Friedrich Gretsch, and Marion Downey Gretsch. She was raised in Bayport on Long Island and attended Packer Collegiate Institute; serving as junior class vice president and senior class president. In 1944, Wells began her university education at Manhattanville College, where she was a classmate of Ethel Skakel and Jean Kennedy. She received a bachelor's degree from Manhattanville in 1948.

== Career ==
In 1992, Wells became co-chair of the Heritage Foundation's Legacy Society, a "group of Heritage supporters who make gifts through their estates so Heritage will be a permanent voice in Washington for conservative principles." She raised over $292 million in gifts and commitments in that position.

In 2003, upon the death of her husband, Wells was elected to the board of trustees of the Heritage Foundation, where she served until her death in 2016.

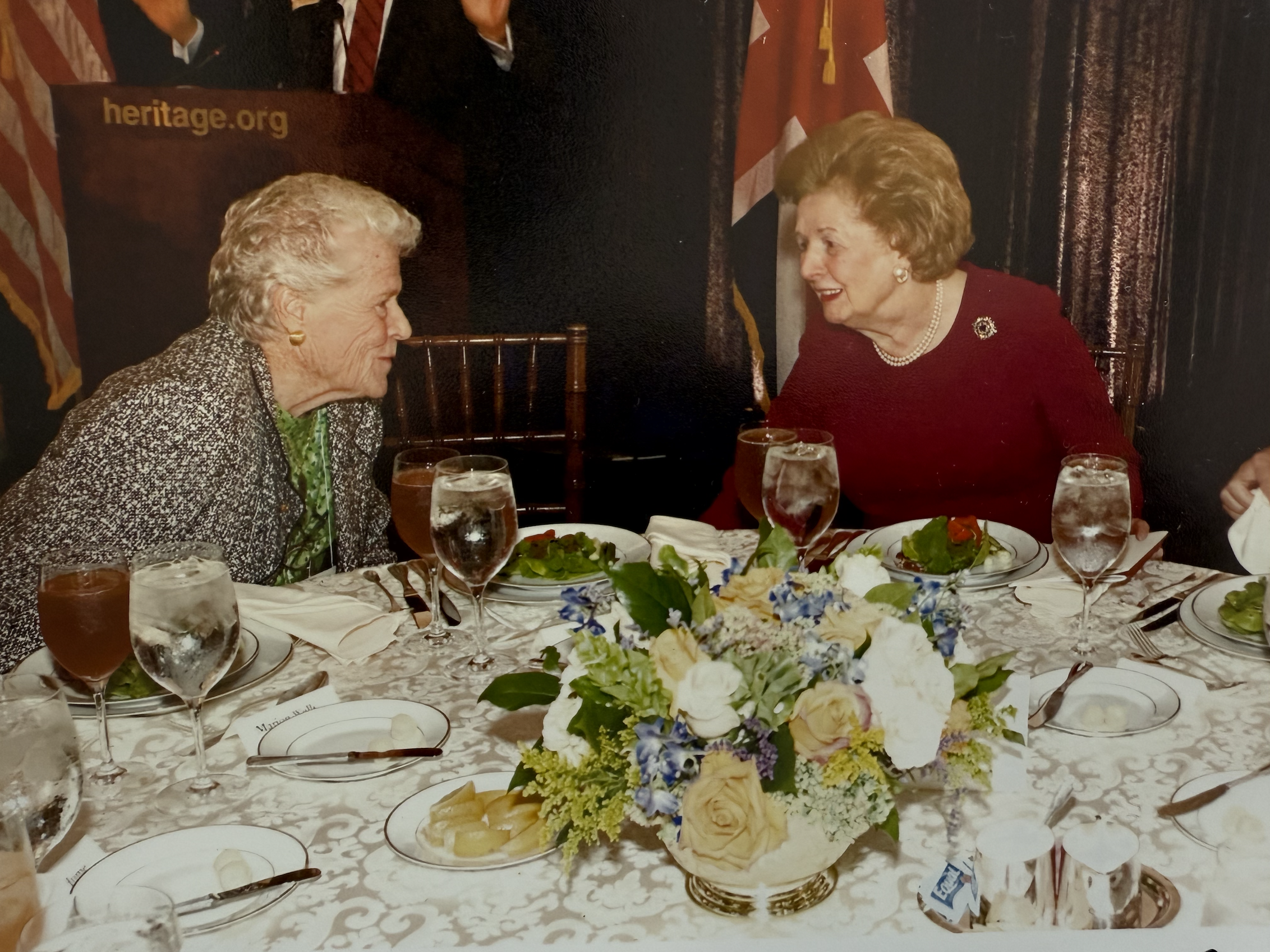
Wells with British prime minister Margaret Thatcher in Washington, D.C.

In addition to Heritage, she served on the board of directors of the Capital Research Center, Intercollegiate Studies Institute, Cleveland Clinic Florida, and Exuma Cays Land and Sea Park.

In 2015, upon the urging of former U.S. attorney general Edwin Meese, she became the Capital Research Center's first trustee emerita after 21 years on the board.

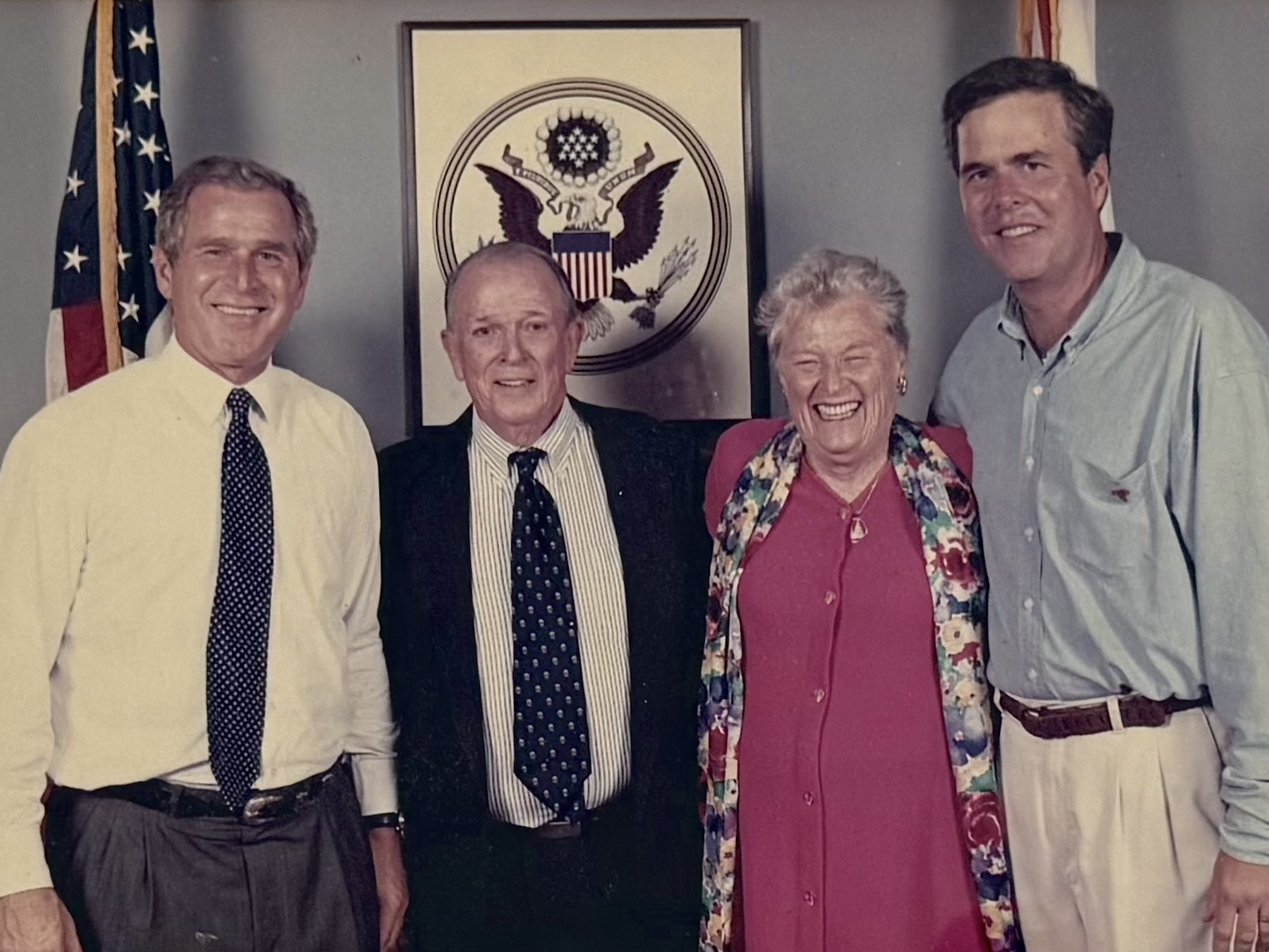
Wells and her husband, Dick, with President George W. Bush and Governor Jeb Bush in 2002

Wells was a Republican political donor, having contributed to George W. Bush, John McCain, Mike Pence, and over 140 other candidates for federal office.

=== Marion G. Wells Foundation ===
Wells was the founder and president of the Marion G. Wells Foundation; an American grant-making nonprofit organization established in 2001 and headquartered in Windermere, Florida. The foundation operates as a tax-exempt public charity and supports conservative think tanks and advocacy groups. The foundation initially received funding from Marion and her husband, Dick Wells. As of the fiscal year 2023; the foundation reported approximately $3.17 million in liquid assets and an annual revenue of $1.5 million. Following Wells's death in 2016, her son, John J. Flemm III, was elected president of the foundation.

The Foundation has been a significant donor to several conservative organizations, notably the Heritage Foundation and the Conservative Partnership Institute.

== Personal life ==
Wells was the granddaughter of Friedrich Gretsch, founder of the Gretsch Company. She was a cousin of Gertrude Gretsch Astor; second wife of John Jacob Astor VI.

In 1946, she married John J. Flemm Jr., a United States Navy veteran wounded in the Pacific during World War II and son of John J. Flemm. They had five children together and moved to Fort Lauderdale, Florida, before they divorced in 1969. In 1973, she married Dick Wells, president of The Las Olas Company and owner of the Riverside Hotel. They lived together in Fort Lauderdale until his death in 2003.

In 1991, Wells and her husband were shipwrecked in The Bahamas after their 54-foot sailboat, the Wells Cargo, struck a rock and sank. They were stranded on a small cay before being rescued by a passing cruise ship.

== Death ==
On October 30, 2016, Wells died in her home in Harbor Isles, Fort Lauderdale, Florida, at the age of 90.
