= Orchard Farm =

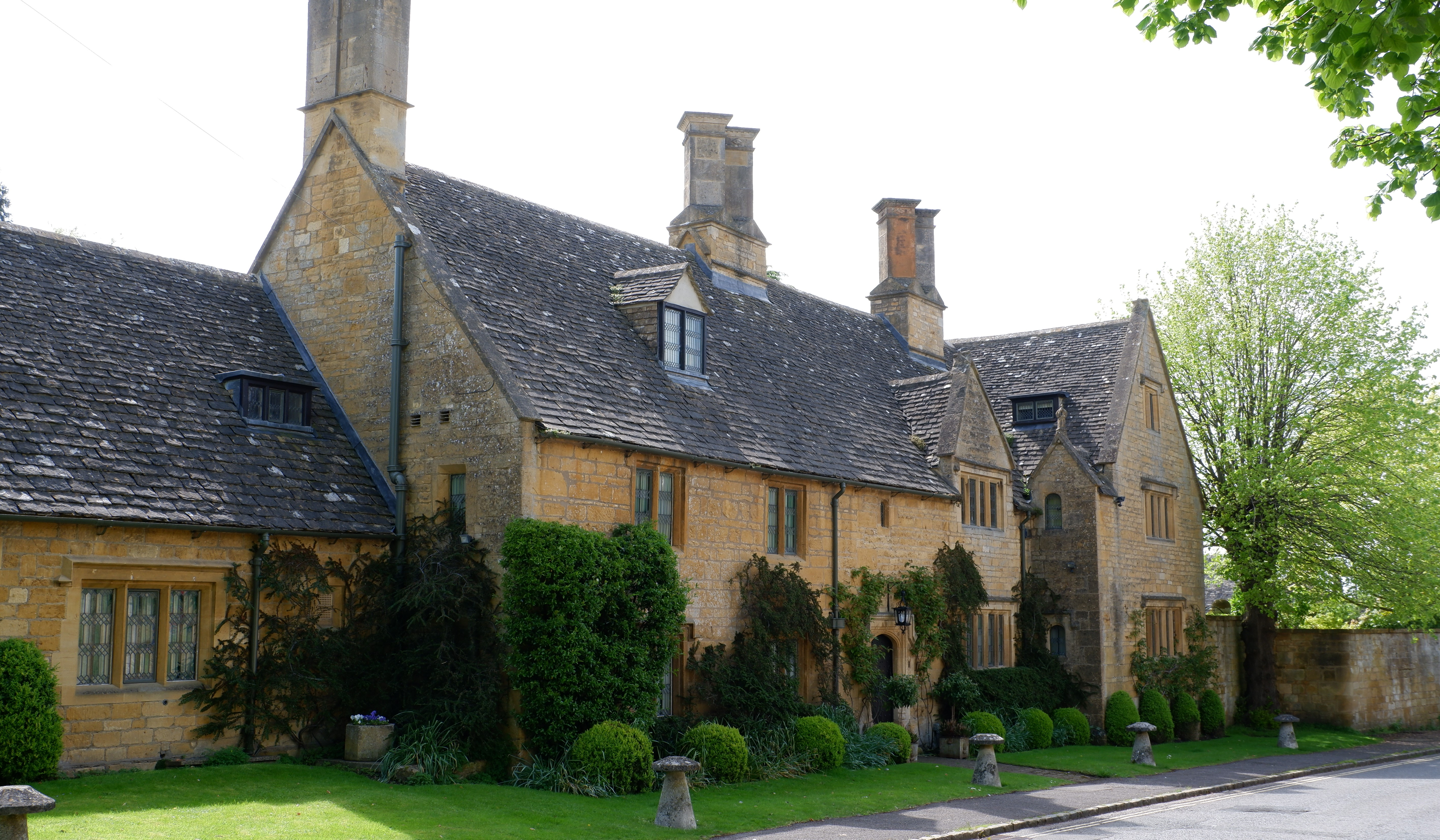
- Orchard Farm, c. 2018

- Location within Worcestershire
- 52.0362°N 1.8481°W
- Location: Broadway, Wychavon, Worcestershire, England

History
- Built: c. 1620

Site notes
- Architectural style: Cotswold
- Restored: c. 1720; 20th century
- Restored by: A. N. Prentice (20th century)

Listed Building – Grade II*
- Type: Historic England
- Designated: 30 July 1959
- Reference no.: 1215520

Orchard Farm is a Cotswold farm and country house in Broadway, Worcestershire, England. It is a Grade II* listed building and is at the centre of a private estate. The house was restored and extended twice during the early 20th century.

== History ==
Wool merchants built Orchard Farm around 1620. Nearly a century later, in 1720, the Walker family restored and expanded the house, keeping with the traditional style.

In the 19th century, the estate fell upon ill fortune and was divided into two smaller dwellings, until the farm was acquired by Lady Maud Bowes-Lyon. Bowes-Lyon hired architect A. N. Prentice to restore the residence, expand the home, and design an English garden around the property.

Thomas E. Wells purchased the farm in 1904 and hired artist Alfred Parsons to redesign the gardens. In 1910, Wells died at the estate; the funeral was held at the home, conducted by Francis Xavier Morgan, and attended by then 18-year-old J. R. R. Tolkien.

In 1945, nearly 9 acres of arable fields and orchards owned by Orchard Farm were compulsorily purchased under the Housing Acts 1936 to 1944 to provide extra houses for the village.

Orchard Farm remained in the Wells family until 1953, when Professor and Mrs. Goiten purchased the estate. The house has since been split into two separate houses and the barns and outbuildings have also been converted into independent homes.

== Notable residents ==
- Lady Maud Bowes-Lyon
- Sir Thomas E. Wells
- Sir Gerald Nabarro
