= Friedrich Gretsch =

American businessman (1856–1895)

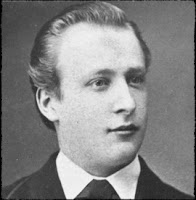
- Gretsch, c. 1890–95
- Born: Friedrich Wilhelm Gretsch; May 13, 1856; Mannheim, Grand Duchy of Baden, German Confederation
- Died: April 28, 1895 (aged 38); Hamburg, German Empire
- Resting place: Green-Wood Cemetery
- Occupation: Businessman
- Known for: Founding Gretsch
- Spouse: Rosa Gretsch
- Children: 7
- Relatives: Marion Gretsch (granddaughter); Gertrude Gretsch Astor (granddaughter)

Friedrich Wilhelm "Fritz" Gretsch (May 13, 1856 – April 28, 1895) was a German American businessman and industrialist. He was the founder of the Gretsch Company, a musical instrument manufacturing and marketing company based in Brooklyn, New York.

Born and raised in Mannheim, Germany, in what was then the Grand Duchy of Baden, Gretsch immigrated to the United States in 1873. During the Gilded Age, he established his manufacturing company at a time when mass production and standardization were beginning. His company would go on to become one of the largest musical instrument companies in the United States. As of 2025, the Gretsch family still owns and operates the Gretsch Company.

After traveling aboard the SS Fürst Bismarck to Hamburg to visit family in April 1895, he died in the fifth cholera pandemic.

== Early life ==
Friedrich Wilhelm Gretsch was born on May 13, 1856, in Mannheim, Grand Duchy of Baden, German Confederation, the oldest of nine children of Wilhelm and Anna Gretsch. His father owned a successful general store in Mannheim and his mother had several brothers who immigrated to California.

In 1873, as a teenager, Gretsch boarded the Vandalia steamship and immigrated to the United States through Ellis Island. He briefly worked for a wine merchant before gaining employment with the drum and banjo manufacturing company, Albert Houdlett and Sons.

== Career ==
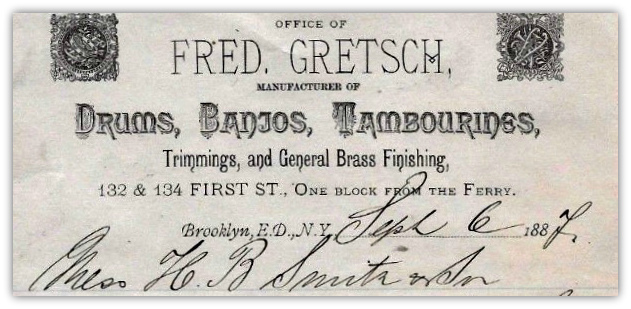
Gretsch business letter, 1887

In 1883, Gretsch founded his own musical instrument shop, The Gretsch Company, at 128 Middleton Street in Brooklyn. His shop was designed for the manufacture of banjos, tambourines, and drums, with the company experiencing some success catering to marching bands. The operation moved to South 4th Street in 1894.

The company would go on to produce instruments for artists such as: Chet Atkins, Eric Clapton, and George Harrison, who played a Gretsch guitar during The Beatles' first appearance on The Ed Sullivan Show.

== Personal life ==
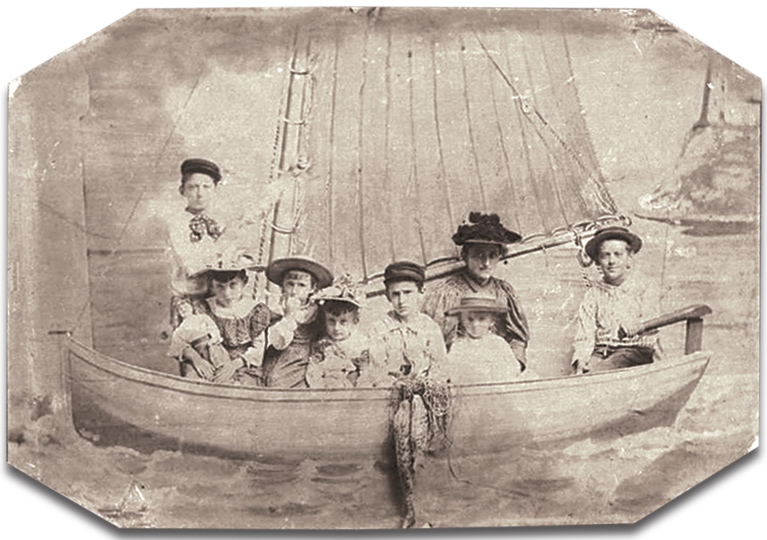
Rosa with their children, 1894

Gretsch was married to his wife Rosa and lived in New York City. They had seven children, including: Frederick Gretsch Sr., William Walter "Bill" Gretsch, Louis Gretsch, and Herbert Gretsch. Walter's daughter Gertrude would marry John Jacob Astor VI in 1944 and give birth to Gretsch's great-granddaughter, Mary Jacqueline Astor (b. 1949), who married John Rozet Drexel IV (b. 1945), great-great-grandson of Anthony Joseph Drexel, in 1984. Gretsch was also the grandfather of Marion G. Wells, daughter of Louis and Marion Downey Gretsch.

On April 11, 1895, Gretsch traveled aboard the SS Fürst Bismarck to Hamburg to visit family and expand his business into Europe. His arrival coincided with the 1881–1896 cholera pandemic and he contracted the disease within days of his arrival. Gretsch died from cholera in Hamburg, on April 28, 1895, at the age of 38. He is buried at Green-Wood Cemetery in Brooklyn.
