= Thomas E. Wells =

British American businessman (1855–1910)

The Honourable Sir Thomas E. Wells Bt
- Born: Thomas Edmund Wells; January 28, 1855; Birmingham, Warwickshire, England, United Kingdom
- Died: August 4, 1910 (aged 55); Orchard Farm, Worcestershire, England, United Kingdom
- Occupations: Businessman; philanthropist
- Known for: Co-founder of Quaker Oats
- Spouse: Mary Nash (m. 1878)
- Children: 7
- Parent(s): John Wells; Diana Nash
- Relatives: Dick Wells (grandson); Greeley Wells (grandson)
- Family: Wells family

Sir Thomas Edmund Wells, 3rd Baronet (January 28, 1855 – August 4, 1910) was a British American business magnate and cattle baron. He was a member of the Chicago Board of Trade before leading one of the largest meat-packing companies in the United States. He was also one of the founders of the Quaker Oats Company.

Born and raised in Birmingham, England, Wells immigrated to the United States as a teenager in 1870. During the Gilded Age, he worked as a corporate executive in the American financial services and food industry. In 1890, he founded Rush Creek Ranch in Nebraska and established his trading firm, T. E. Wells & Co., in 1902. After becoming a multi-millionaire, Wells returned to England in 1904, inherited a baronetcy in 1906, and lived in retirement at his estate until his death in 1910.

== Early life ==
Thomas Edmund Wells was born in Birmingham, England, on January 28, 1855, to John Wells and Diana Nash, grandniece of historian Treadway Russell Nash. He was baptized on June 3, 1855 in St George's Church, Edgbaston and was raised alongside his younger brother, Samuel. In the summer of 1869, his mother died and the family decided to relocate the following year. In 1870, Wells, his father, and Samuel immigrated to the United States and settled in Hyde Park Township, Illinois. After immigrating, Wells dropped out of school at age 15 and began his career.

== Career ==
In 1870, he began working as a bank messenger for Lunt, Preston, and Kean. He was working at the bank house during the Great Chicago Fire; escaping the building as it caught fire and collapsed. In 1873, he went to work for the Chicago Board of Trade and was made partner of the firm in 1876, alongside Robert Stuart. By the late 1870s, Wells was appointed director of Stuart's new company, Quaker Oats; a position he would retain until his death. He would later serve as vice president. At that time, the Quaker Oats Company was doing $16 million of sales annually, selling wheat cereals, farina, hominy, cornmeal, baby food, and animal feed. By 1918, the company did $123 million in sales.

After a debtor defaulted on their loan, Wells received several thousand head of cattle as collateral. In 1890, he initially purchased 10,000 acres of land in the Sandhills of the Nebraska panhandle from the Union Pacific Railroad, establishing Rush Creek Land & Livestock Company. Before his death, the ranch would grow to 155,864 acres and is still owned and operated by the Wells family, as of 2025.

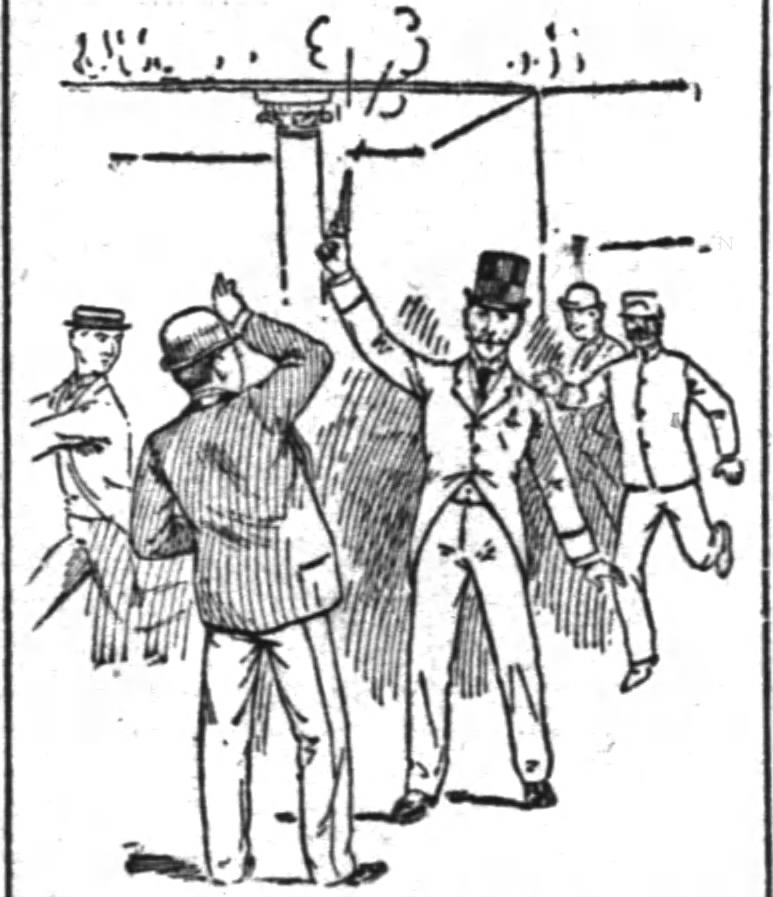
Etching of Adkins firing his pistol on the trading floor; Chicago Inter Ocean

In 1891, Henry Adkins, an "eccentric Englishman" who lost heavily in the market, stormed the floor of the Chicago Board of Trade and discharged his firearm three times before pointing the pistol at Wells in an apparent attempt to "call his attention". Adkins was arrested on site and charged with "assault to kill".

In 1896, Wells left the Chicago Board of Trade to become president of Continental Packing Company. He opened his own trading firm, T.E. Wells & Co., in 1902 and became a major leader in the meat-packing industry.

== Personal life and death ==
Wells married his first cousin Mary Nash of Inkberrow in Chicago on October 17, 1878. They had seven children together and lived in Hyde Park, Chicago until their retirement. They acquired Orchard Farm in the Cotswolds and moved back to England where the couple lived until Thomas's death from appendicitis on August 4, 1910. His funeral service was conducted by Rev. Francis Xavier Morgan the following day and a memorial was held. His body was transported back to Chicago on the RMS Baltic, escorted by his son Preston. He was buried at Winnetka Congregational Church Cemetery.

In 1906, Wells inherited the Wells baronetcy from his first cousin Sir Arthur Spencer Wells, son of Sir Thomas Spencer Wells.

For many years, Wells was a member of the Chicago Club.

=== Children ===
List of children:

- Mary Wells (1879–1969)
- Sir John Edward Wells, 4th Baronet (1881–1945)
- Anne Diana Wells (1883–1957)
- Thomas Edmund Wells Jr (1885–1940)
- Richard Arthur Wells (1888–1895)
- Preston Albert Wells Sr (1891–1974)
- Eleanor May Wells (1896–1978)

Baronetage of the United Kingdom
Preceded by Arthur Spencer Wells	Baronet (of Upper Grosvenor Street); 1906–1910	Succeeded by John Edward Wells
