= Giorgio Polacco =

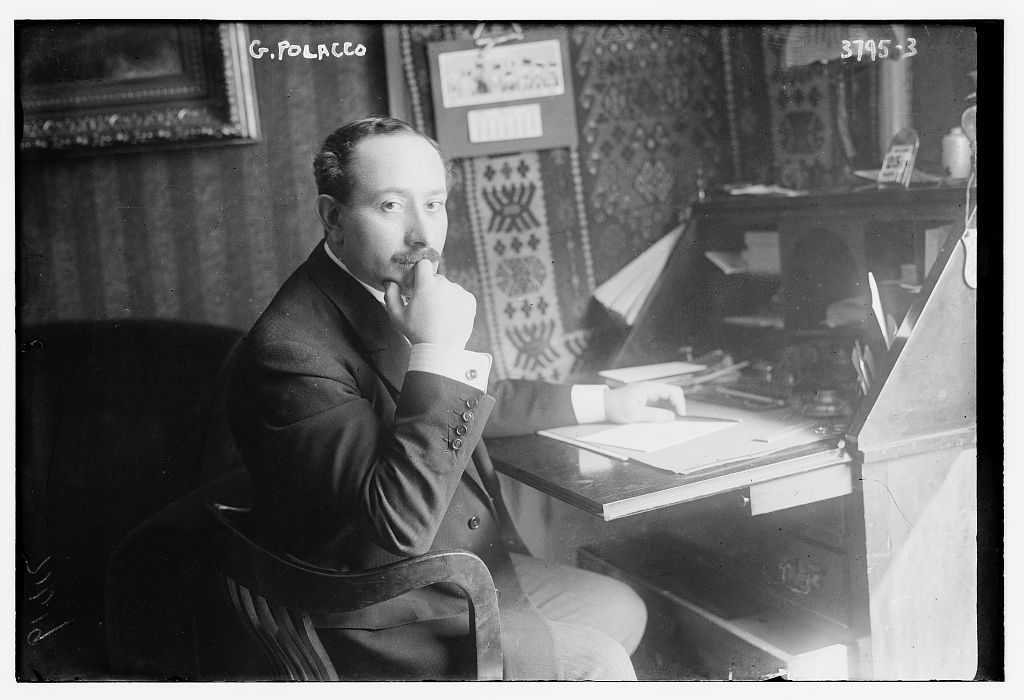
- Polacco in 1915
- Born: April 12, 1875; Venice, Italy
- Died: April 30, 1960 (aged 85); Manhattan, New York
- Occupation: Conductor
- Employer(s): Metropolitan Opera (1915-1917); Chicago Civic Opera (1921-1930)
- Spouse: Edith Mason (married twice)

Giorgio Polacco (April 12, 1875 - April 30, 1960) was the conductor of the Metropolitan Opera from 1915 to 1917 and the Chicago Civic Opera from 1921 to 1930.

== Biography ==
He was born in Venice, Italy on April 12, 1875. He studied at the Conservatorio di Musica Benedetto Marcello di Venezia and then in Milan and St Petersburg.

In 1915 he became the conductor of the Metropolitan Opera replacing Arturo Toscanini. Polacco held that position until 1917. In 1918 he was hired by the Chicago Opera Association. He married Edith Mason in 1919. They had a daughter Graziella Polacco Berlanga born on June 23rd, 1925.

In 1921 he became the conductor of the Chicago Civic Opera. In 1928 he was hospitalized with appendicitis.

He divorced Edith Mason on July 21, 1929. He retired from the Chicago Civic Opera in 1930.

On May 15, 1931, he remarried Edith Mason. They divorced in 1937.

Polacco died in Manhattan on April 30, 1960.
