= Elbo Room =

Bar in Fort Lauderdale, Florida

Coordinates: 26.1195°N 80.1047°W

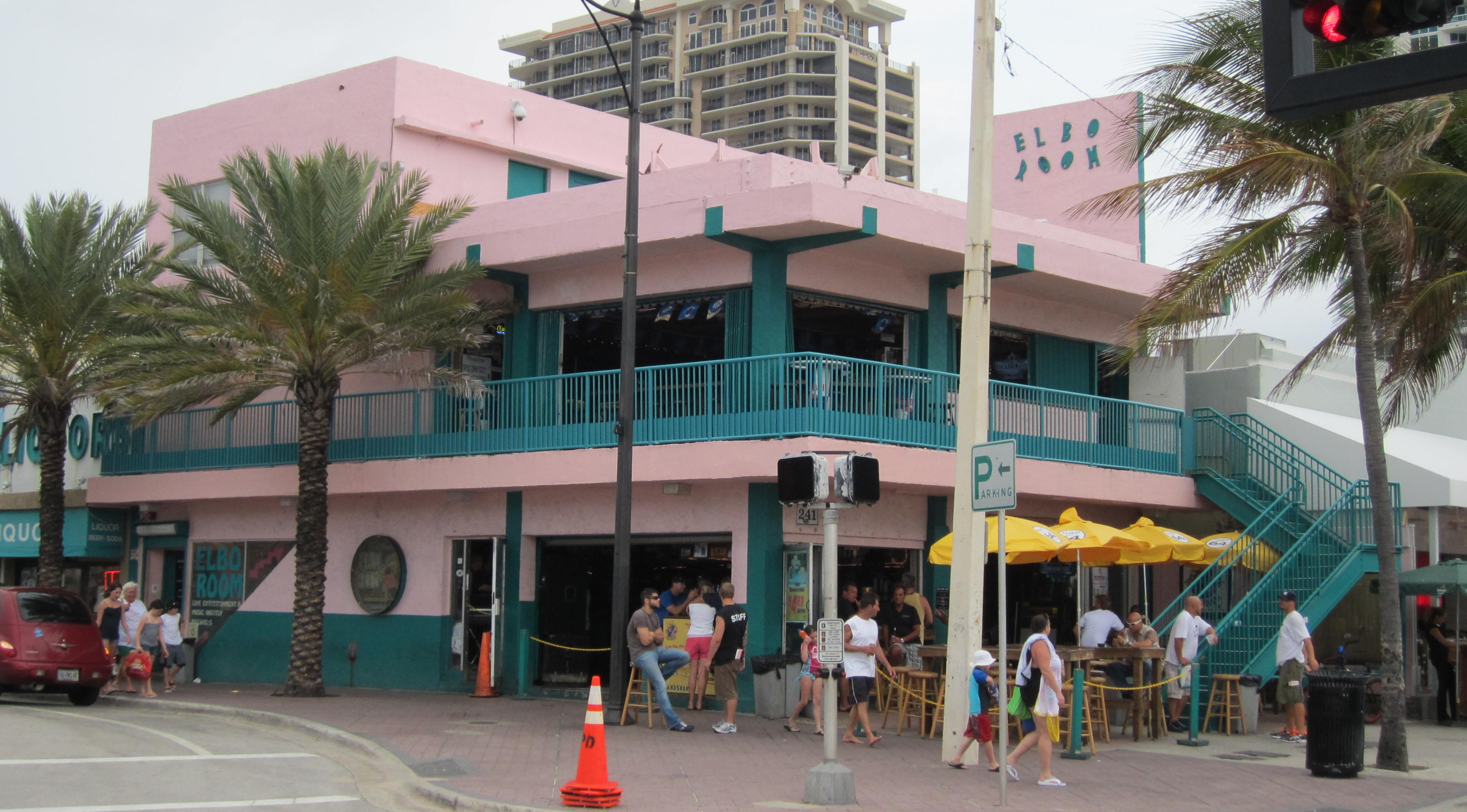
Elbo Room

The Elbo Room is a bar that was established in 1938 at 241 South Fort Lauderdale Beach Boulevard, Fort Lauderdale, Florida and that became a landmark for Fort Lauderdale Beach. The bar was featured in the 1960 film Where the Boys Are. Its location at the corner of Las Olas Boulevard places it on one end of the Fort Lauderdale strip. It is well-known for being the host of multiple surfing and boogie boarding championships in the late 1980s and early 1990s, and a boogie-boarding competition won by Jason Goodman in 1988 was the signature event during this time period. The bar was the scene of the Florida Panthers' celebration the night of their 2024 and 2025 Stanley Cup championships.
