= Edith Mason =

American opera singer

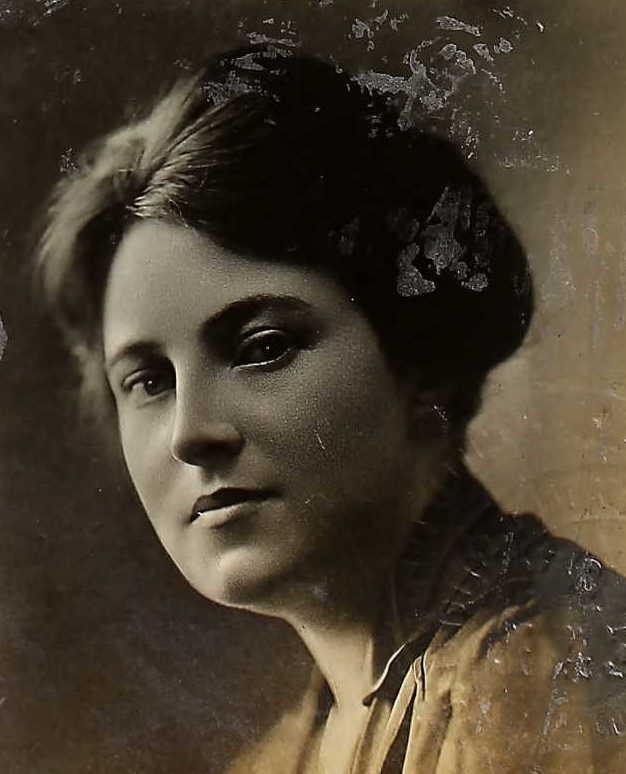
File photo of Edith Mason, March 1918

Edith Mason (March 22, 1892 – November 26, 1973) was an American lyric soprano.

She was born Edith Barnes on March 22, 1892, in St. Louis, Missouri and studied in Boston, Philadelphia, and Paris. She made her singing début on January 27, 1912, as Nedda in Pagliacci with the Boston Opera Company. During the next three years, she sang in Europe at Nice, Marseilles, and Paris. In 1914 she was singing at the Opera Comique in Paris when the war terminated her engagement. Returning to America, she made her debut at the Metropolitan as Sophie in Der Rosenkavalier on November 20, 1915. From 1917 to 1919, she was a member of the Metropolitan Opera Company.

In 1919, she married Giorgio Polacco. In 1921 she became one of the leading singers of the Chicago Opera Association. She divorced Polacco on July 21, 1929, and was married to Dr. Maurice Bernstein, guardian of the young Orson Welles.

She remarried Polacco on May 15, 1931. They divorced in 1937. She later married William E. Ragland.

She died of a stroke in San Diego, California, on November 26, 1973, at age 80.

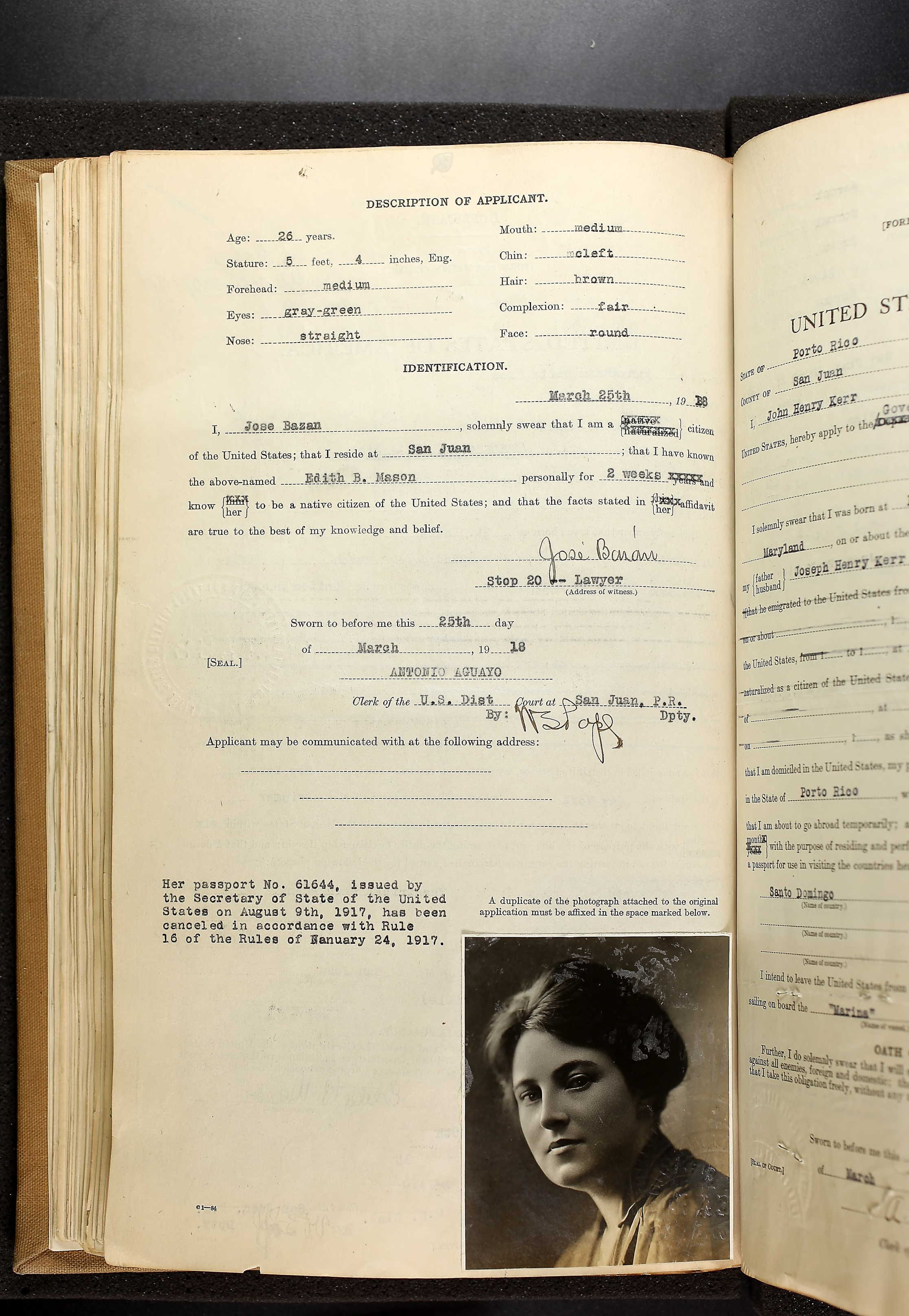
Edith Mason's passport, pg. 1., 1918

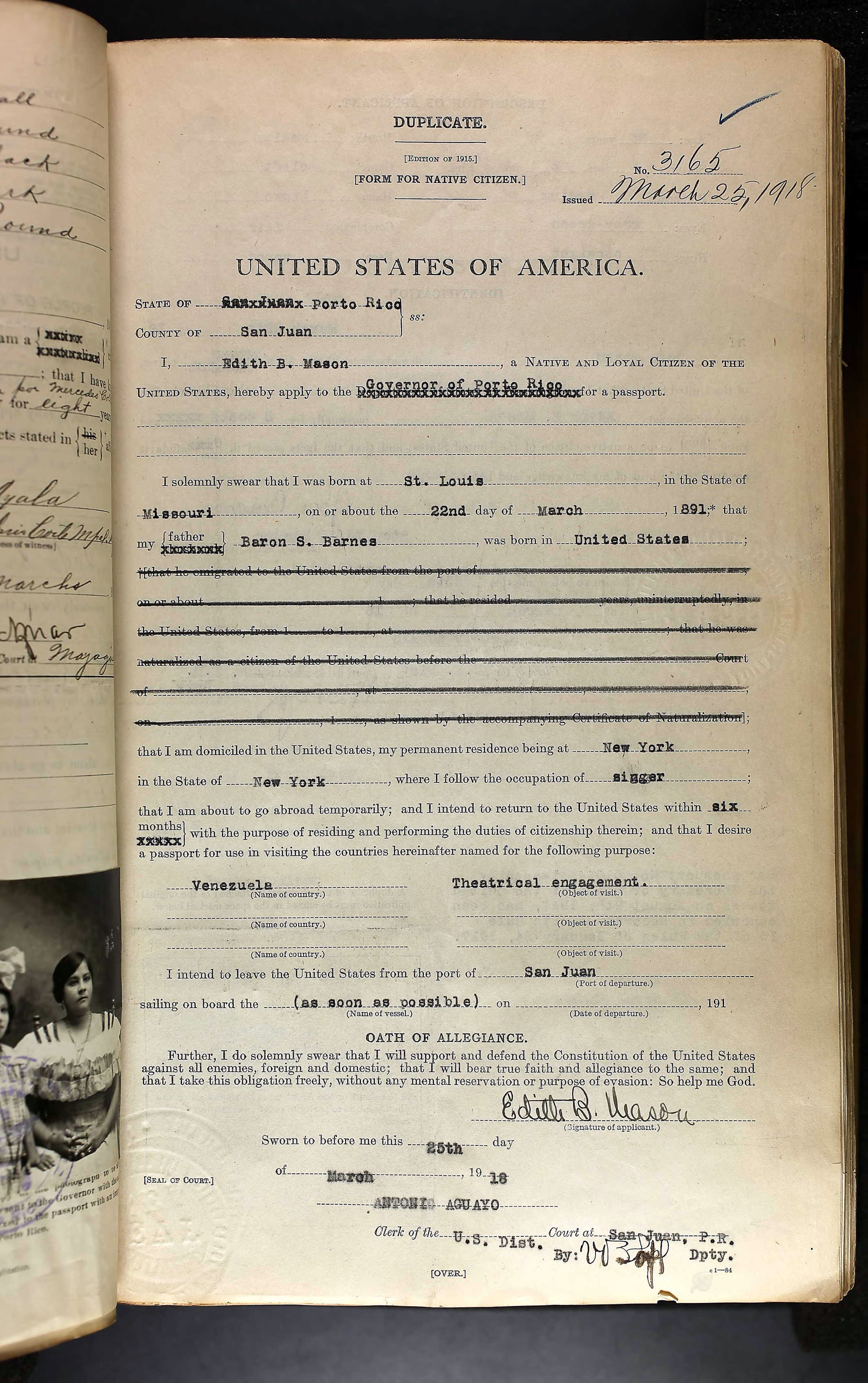
Edith Mason's passport, pg. 2., 1918

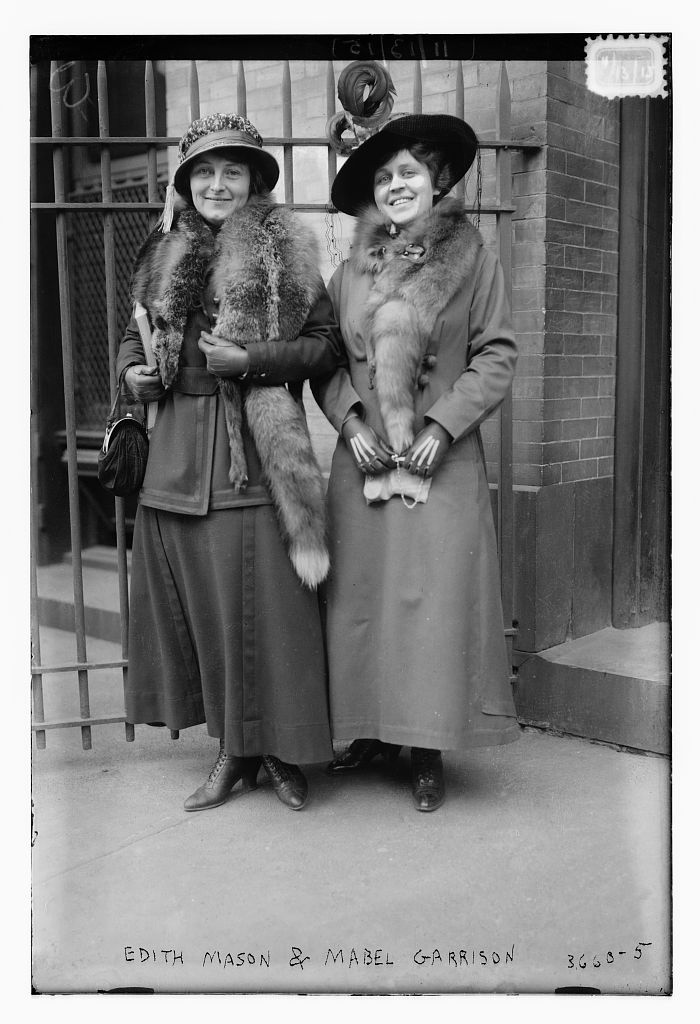
Edith Mason and Mabel Garrison on November 11, 1915, at the Metropolitan Opera, New York

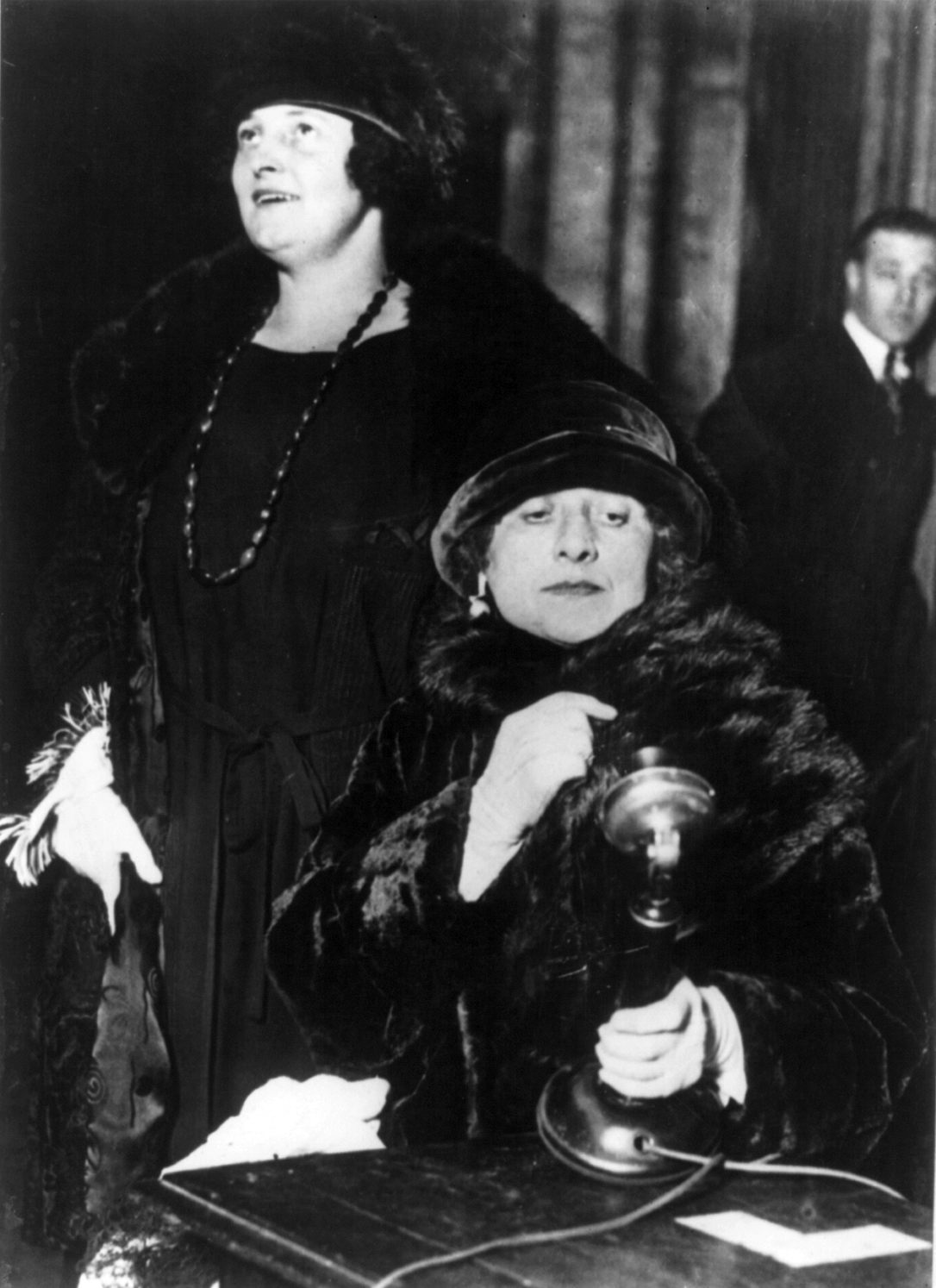
Edith Mason (seated) sings for the first regular radio program of operas (Chicago, 1921), with Mary Garden in attendance
