= Florida Taxation and Budget Reform Commission =

Government commission in Florida

Agency overview
- Formed: 1988; 37 years ago
- Preceding agency: Florida Tax Commission
- Type: State agency
- Jurisdiction: Government of Florida
- Headquarters: Tallahassee, Florida, U.S.
- Parent agency: Florida Cabinet

The Florida Taxation and Budget Reform Commission (TBRC) is a state commission of Florida established by the Florida Constitution to examine the state's budgetary process, revenue needs, expenditure processes, and tax structure. The commission also oversees governmental productivity and efficiency.

The commission was formed as the successor to the Florida Tax Commission, established during the tenure of Governor Bob Graham.

== Structure ==
=== Membership ===
The commission has 25 appointed members:

- 11 members appointed by the governor and who are not current members of the Florida Legislature
- Seven members appointed by the speaker of the House and who are not current members of the state legislature
- Seven members appointed by the president of the Senate and who are not current members of the state legislature
- Four non-voting ex-officio members who are current members of the state legislature:
  - Two appointed by the speaker of the House (one being a member of the minority party in the Florida House of Representatives)
  - Two appointed by the president of the Senate (one being a member of the minority party in the Florida Senate)

== Responsibility ==
The Florida Constitution requires the TBRC to convene every 20 years on the following schedule: 2007, 2027, 2047, 2067, and so on.

=== The commission is charged with examining ===
- The state budgetary process
- State revenue needs and expenditure processes
- The appropriateness and efficiency of the state's tax structure
- The state's revenue-raising capabilities
- The state's constitutional limitations on taxation and expenditures

The commission must review policies related to the government's ability to tax and fund governmental operations over the next 20-year period and determine methods for raising revenue for the state. The commission is charged with reviewing the state's comprehensive planning, budgeting, and needs assessment processes and determining "whether the resulting information adequately supports a strategic decision-making process."
