= List of neighborhoods in Fort Lauderdale, Florida =

Fort Lauderdale, Florida, unlike many cities in the United States, has an official program for recognizing official neighborhoods. Under the Neighborhood Organization Recognition Program, over 60 distinct neighborhoods have received official recognition from the city. An additional 25–30 neighborhoods exist without official recognition, although the city's neighborhood map displays them as well.

- Bal Harbour
- Bay Colony
- Bay Colony Club
- Bermuda Riviera
- Beverly Heights
- Birch Park-Finger Streets
- Boulevard Park Isles
- Breakwater Surf Club
- Central Beach
- Chula Vista Isles
- City View
- Colee Hammock
- Coral Ridge
- Coral Ridge Country Club Estates
- Coral Ridge Isles
- Coral Shores
- Croissant Park
- Dillard Park
- Dolphin Isles
- Dorsey Riverbend
- Downtown Fort Lauderdale
- Durrs
- Edgewood
- Flagler Village
- Flamingo Park
- Galt Ocean Mile
- Golden Heights
- Harbor Beach
- Harbor Drive
- Harbordale
- Harbour Inlet
- Harbour Isles
- Hendricks and Venice Isles
- Himmarshee Village (Historic District)
- Home Beautiful Park
- Idlewyld
- Imperial Point
- Knoll Ridge
- Lake Aire-Palm View
- Lake Estates
- Lake Ridge
- Landings
- Las Olas Isles
- Lauderdale Beach
- Lauderdale Harbours
- Lauderdale Isles
- Lauderdale Manors
- Lauderdale West
- Laudergate Isles
- Lofts of Palm Aire Village
- Melrose Manors
- Melrose Park
- Middle River Terrace
- Montego Bay
- Navarro Isle
- North Beach Island
- North Golf Estates
- Nurmi Isles
- Oak River
- Palm Aire Village East
- Palm Aire Village West
- Poinciana Park
- Poinsettia Heights
- Port Royale
- Progresso Village
- Rio Vista
- River Garden/Sweeting Estates
- River Oaks
- River Run
- Riverland
- Riverland Manors
- Riverland Village
- Riverland Woods
- Riverlandings
- Riverside Park
- Riviera Isles
- Rock Island
- Sailboat Bend
- Seven Isles
- Shady Banks
- South (Lauderdale) Beach
- South Middle River
- Sunrise Intracoastal
- Sunrise Key
- Sunset
- Tarpon River
- Tropical Point
- Twin Lakes North
- Victoria Park
