= Broward Center for the Performing Arts =

Multi-venue performing arts complex in Fort Lauderdale, Florida, USA

- Address: 201 SW 5th Ave; Fort Lauderdale, FL 33312-7112
- Location: Sailboat Bend
- Owner: Broward County
- Operator: Performing Arts Center Authority
- Capacity: 2,658 (Au-Rene Theater); 584 (Amaturo Theater); 188-220 (Abdo New River Room); 220 (Porter Riverview Ballroom)
- Type: Performing arts center

Construction
- Opened: February 26, 1991
- Renovated: 2014
- Architect: Benjamin Thompson and Associates

Tenants
- Broadway Across America; Florida Grand Opera

Website
- https://www.browardcenter.org/

The Broward Center for the Performing Arts, commonly known as the Broward Center, is a multi-venue performing arts complex located in the Sailboat Bend neighborhood of downtown Fort Lauderdale, along the north bank of the New River. Opened in 1991 on a 5.5-acre (22,000 m^{2}) site, the center is part of the Riverwalk Arts and Entertainment District and has contributed to the redevelopment of the city's downtown area.

Designed by architect Benjamin C. Thompson, the complex includes multiple theaters that host a variety of performances, including opera, ballet, concerts, plays, lectures, and community events. The Broward Center partners with several organizations, such as the Symphony of the Americas, Florida Grand Opera, Miami City Ballet, the Concert Association of Florida, and Gold Coast Jazz. National touring Broadway productions are regularly presented in collaboration with Broadway Across America.

Located in the South Florida region, the Broward Center has been recognized as one of the most-visited theaters in the United States. In 2007, it was ranked fourth in the world by Venues Today and seventh worldwide by the concert industry publication Pollstar based on annual ticket sales.

As of 2011, the center reported attendance of over 700,000 patrons annually across more than 700 events. That same year, plans were announced for a major expansion project, scheduled to begin in spring 2012.

== Architects and design team ==
- Architect: Benjamin Thompson and Associates, Inc., Cambridge, Massachusetts
- Acoustician: Kirkegaard Associates, Chicago, Illinois
- Theater Consultant: Jules Fisher Associates, New York, New York
- Consulting Engineer: Spillis Candela & Partners, Inc., Miami, Florida

== Historical development ==
The Florida legislature in 1984 established the Performing Arts Center Authority (PACA) to oversee construction, then policy-making, at the Broward Center. The Downtown Development Authority, along with citizens, private sources, and the Broward Performing Arts Foundation worked together to raise the funding required to build the theater complex.

By the end of 1987, initial fundraising goals had been met and with supplementary grant monies from city, county, state, and national sources secured, the project went out to bid. The acclaimed Cambridge, Massachusetts architecture firm of Benjamin Thompson and Associates, Inc was selected to design the facility. A groundbreaking ceremony was held in May 1988 to initiate the building phase.

By early 1991 the 224,500-square-foot (20,860 m^{2}) facility was completed at a cost of $54 million. The doors officially opened on February 26, 1991, with the first national tour of Andrew Lloyd Webber's The Phantom of the Opera. The tenth anniversary of the Broward Center was marked by retiring the entire building mortgage, 11 years ahead of schedule.

In 2007, from June 28-July 1, they premiered the Go, Diego, Go! live. The Live was based on the episode titled "The Great Jaguar Rescue". The Broward Center for the Performing Arts was the last stop for the Go, Diego, Go! live. It was one of the most popular art performances that ever happened.

== Riverwalk Arts & Entertainment District ==
In 1998, the Broward Center began a collaboration with neighboring merchants and cultural attractions along the New River that would evolve into the formation of the Riverwalk Arts and Entertainment District. This destination marketing organization features the Broward Center, The Museum of Art/Fort Lauderdale, Florida Grand Opera, Concert Association of Florida, Fort Lauderdale Historical Society, and Historic Stranahan House Museum. Formed to promote cultural tourism to Fort Lauderdale and to the Riverwalk District, in particular, more than 1 million ticketed visitors annually attend programming at the combined Arts & Entertainment District partner venues.

== Expansion and management ==
In 2004 Broward Center became a managing partner of the Rose and Alfred Miniaci Performing Arts Center, located on the campus of Nova Southeastern University. A year later, Broward Center assumed management of the historic 1100-seat Parker Playhouse in east Fort Lauderdale. In 2007, Broward Center was chosen as the creative consultants to help guide the emerging Miramar Cultural Center/Arts Park in western Broward County through its early development. It will now manage operations of this new 800-seat theater, scheduled to open in the fall of 2008.

The Broward Center is governed by the Performing Arts Center Authority (the "Authority"), a volunteer board of 13 members. In October 2023, the Authority announced its appointment of Ty Sutton as president and CEO of the Broward Center. Sutton, who begins his new position on February 12, 2024, will succeed Kelley Shanley who has served as President & CEO since January 2009.

== Venues and facilities ==
Performance venues at BCPA, on the New River (Himmarshee):

Au-Rene Theater, the main performance space for major international, national and regional productions, including Miami City Ballet, Concert Association of Florida, Florida Grand Opera and Broadway Across America touring companies.

- Capacity: 2,658
- Notable performances: The Phantom of the Opera (1991 and 2018), Tony Bennett (2007), Broadway's The Lion King (2002, 2007 and 2015), Whoopi Goldberg (2005), Renée Fleming (2006), Wicked (2008), k.d. lang (2008)
- Seating structure: Orchestra, Mezzanine, and Balcony

Amaturo Theater, for dramatic productions as well as children's theater, film, community theater, choirs, chamber, jazz, folk and symphonic orchestras, seminars, and emerging dance companies.

- Capacity: 584
- Notable performances: Gold Coast Jazz, Symphony of the Americas, Capitol Steps, Second City Revue, Paula Poundstone, Jane Monheit

Abdo New River Room, a conference/banquet/performance facility available for various types of activities, such as cabaret, dinner theater, rehearsals, and speaker programs as well as for public and private receptions and events.

- Capacity: 225 seated seminar/theater style; 200 banquet style:
- Notable performances: Tony n’Tina's Wedding, Next Step Dance Theater, Laffing Matterz
- Location: On the same Ft. Lauderdale campus with the Amaturo and Au-Rene theaters

== Performance venues managed by BCPA ==
Parker Playhouse a nearly 1,200-seat theater now managed by the Broward Center's governing authority, PACA, this space is for concerts, theatre, comedy, and dance.

- Capacity: 1,147
- Notable performances: In its initial heyday, Parker Playhouse hosted productions featuring Elizabeth Taylor, Faye Dunaway and James Earl Jones. Judy Collins (2006), Dixie Carter & Hal Holbrook, Southern Comforts (2006), Preservation Hall Jazz Band (2006), Marvin Hamlisch (2007), Tea at Five with Tovah Feldshuh (2006), Ladysmith Black Mambazo (2007)
- Seating: Continental seating
- Location: 707 NE 8th Street, Fort Lauderdale, FL 33304

Rose and Alfred Miniaci Performing Arts Center, equipped with lighting and acoustics, and a satellite downlink for viewing broadcast and transmitted productions, this hall is used for many types of community events, corporate gatherings, lectures and children's productions.

- Capacity: 498
- Seating: 399 orchestra, 99 balcony
- Location: On the campus of Nova Southeastern University, 3100 Ray Ferrero Jr. Blvd., Fort Lauderdale

== Awards and distinctions ==
- Mark Nerenhausen, President and CEO of the Broward Center for the Performing Arts, picked up a Silver Medallion Award from the National Conference for Community and Justice March 2007
- Designated a "Point of Culture" by the Brazilian Ministry of Culture, January 2006
