= Rio Vista =

Rio Vista may refer to:

- Rio Vista, California
- Rio Vista station, San Diego
- Rio Vista (Fort Lauderdale), a neighborhood in Fort Lauderdale, Florida
- Rio Vista, a neighborhood in Alpine, New Jersey
- Rio Vista, Texas
- Rio Vista Park, a park in San Marcos, Texas
- Rio Vista Dam, a dam in San Marcos, Texas
- the former home of Canadian engineer William Chaffey, located in Mildura, Victoria, Australia.
