= Nightworld =

Nightworld may refer to:

- Nightworld (novel), the sixth and final volume in a series of novels known as The Adversary Cycle by F. Paul Wilson
- Nightworld (film), a 2017 film directed by Patricio Valladares
- Nightworld: Lost Souls, a 1998 television film directed by Jeff Woolnough
- Nightworld: 30 Years to Life, a 1998 television film directed by Michael Tuchner
- Nightworld: Riddler's Moon, a 1998 television film directed by Don McBrearty
