= Mountain Stream =

Mountain Stream may refer to:

- Mountain stream, a fast-flowing stream in the mountains
- Mountain Stream Salamander
- Mountain Stream Tree Frog
- Mountain Stream, an oil on canvas painting by Marilyn Bendell
