= Donald Renner =

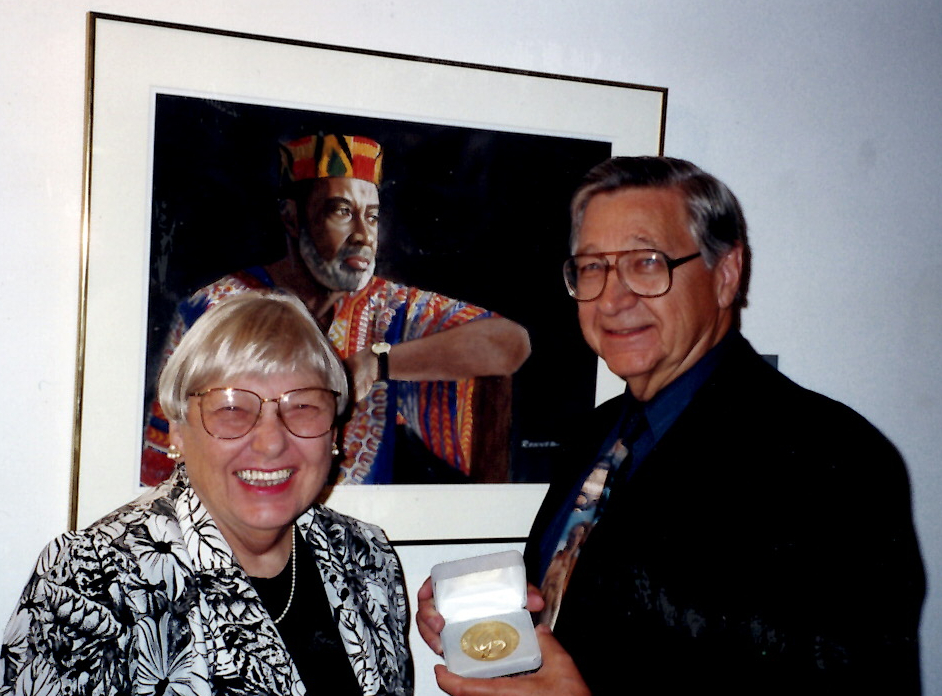
- Photo of Donald Renner with wife, Shirley, at an art show featuring one of his original watercolor portraits
- Born: 15 March 1926; Chicago, Illinois
- Died: January 8, 2014 (aged 87); Ormond Beach, Florida
- Spouse: Shirley Therese (Von Bergen) Renner

Donald Glenn Renner was an American artist, whose most notable works include 32 ceiling paintings on the Ft. Lauderdale Parker Playhouse, a mural size painting for the Seminole Casino in Coconut Creek, a portrait of former Florida Senate President Jim Scott, and a 9 ft (2.7 m) portrait of Don King for his Ft. Lauderdale office. Renner was born of Danish immigrants in Chicago, Illinois in 1926. He attended the Chicago Academy of Fine Arts during high school and subsequent to his service in the Merchant Marines during WWII. After the war, Renner apprenticed as a dot-etcher lithographer while he studied art under Marilyn Bendell. He died at the age of 87 in Ormond Beach, Florida.

== Life ==
From the early age of eleven, Donald Renner began taking art lessons. During his junior and senior years of high school in the Austin neighborhood of Chicago he studied art at the Chicago Academy of Fine Arts. He took a Saturday morning cartoon class and a Life drawing class one night a week. When Renner graduated from high school in 1944, he enlisted in the Merchant Marines on July 25, 1944, traveling through the Mediterranean Middle East, Atlantic, and Pacific theaters until the end of the war. He found time in between harrowing wartime adventures to doodle on letters back home and even to paint an elaborate parrot mural on the smokestack of the S.S. Robert Parrot, which cruised around the Mediterranean. Upon returning to Chicago at the end of the war, he rejoined the Academy of Fine Arts where he received a basic education. He refined his talents and style under art teacher Marilyn Bendell. Renner was one of the founding members of the Austin Town Hall Art Guild in 1947. At Silver Spur Ranch in Gresham, Wisconsin, Donald met Shirley Von Bergen, another Chicagoan. The two married in 1952 at the Mayfair Presbyterian Church. While working in the printing industry during the day to earn a steady living, he painted in the evenings, began teaching art classes in 1963, and entered his work in local art shows. In 1961 he moved his wife and their two daughters, Carol, aged 6, and Gail, aged 3, to Spain for 14 months. Renner said, "I got fed up with the world and decided to chuck everything and take off." They traveled the Atlantic Ocean on the T.S. Bremen, a passenger steam liner. The family rented two different homes in Spain, one in Torremolinos and one in Mijas. Renner's Andalusian Still Life won 1st place in the International Art Festival of Gibraltar in 1962. Before returning to Illinois, Renner bought a VW Beetle to make a family road trip across Europe, stopping in Gibraltar, Germany, Denmark, France, Switzerland, Belgium, Holland, and Sweden.

Renner resettled his family in West Chicago, Illinois, working at Diamond National Corporation. He continued to pursue art in his spare time, having a one-man show of his Spanish paintings at the Palette and Chisel Academy. In 1963, Renner painted a portrait of Spanish soprano singer, Consuelo Rubio. The Heart Association commissioned the portrait to give to the Spanish Embassy in Washington, D.C. Big opportunities opened up for Renner when he became affiliated with the Pheasant Run Lodge and Playhouse in St. Charles for four years. Celebrities he painted during this time included James Mac Arthur, Robert Wagner, Edward Everett Horton, Maureen O'Sullivan, Howard Duff, Alan Young, Linda Darnell, Carolyn Jones, Dan Dailey, Johnny Desmond, and Virginia Graham–who opened her TV show Girl Talk with the portrait. Renner described this time as leading, "two different lives...I worked as a lithographer by day and painted my portraits at night.... It was lots of fun, but the plays were always on Sunday nights and while everyone else could sleep late Monday mornings, I would have to trudge wearily off to work half dead..." In the summer of 1969 the family made another move, this time to South Florida.

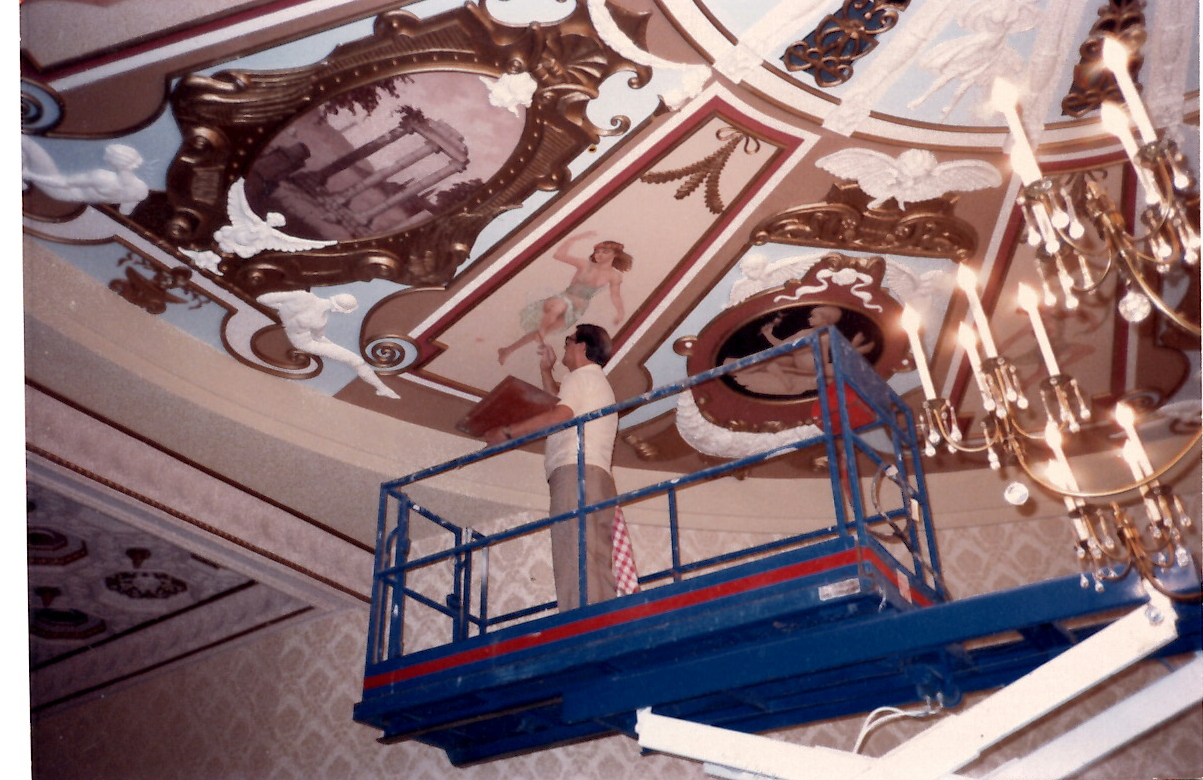
Artist Donald Renner touching up original paintings on Parker Playhouse in Ft. Lauderdale

Renner continued his occupation and his passion in Plantation, a suburb of Ft. Lauderdale, until his biggest project yet came in 1983. Louis Parker commissioned Renner to paint 32 oil paintings on 4 ft × 16 ft (1.2 m × 4.9 m) aluminum panels for the ceiling of the Parker Playhouse. The project took two years and earned $1,000 each. He gained increased public attention for the work with critics calling him "the Michelangelo of South Florida." Other notable commissions during his time in South Florida include a larger than life 9' portrait of Don King and a portrait of King and his wife. Renner painted numerous oil and watercolor paintings of Seminole Indians, including seven 4 ft × 8 ft (1.2 m × 2.4 m) paintings, a 5 ft × 24 ft (1.5 m × 7.3 m) oil mural that hangs in the Seminole Casino, and a portrait of James Billie, Chairman of the Seminole Tribe of Florida. He also received numerous commissions from government agencies. The State of Florida hired him to paint a portrait of the Speaker of the Florida Senate, Republican Jim Scott, which hangs in the Senate Chambers. The State also commissioned three portraits for the National Guard that hang in the museum at Camp Blanding in Starke, Florida. He became an official Coast Guard artist, completing oil paintings of Coast Guard ships. Meanwhile, the United Way commissioned portraits of 6 of its former presidents. His reputation attracted numerous private commissions as well. Renner enjoyed painting original portraits and landscapes for entering into exhibitions and art shows. He continued teaching art classes at the Broward Arts Guild and conducting live demonstrations as an active member of the Broward County art scene.

The Renners relocated within Florida in 1998 to Ormond Beach, a small city north of Daytona Beach. He continued painting commissions and original work as well as teaching art classes at the Daytona Beach Art League. His last portrait was of Captain Richard Phillips, known for his trial at sea, which was portrayed in a feature length film, A Captain's Duty, starring Tom Hanks. Renner gave the portrait to the Phillips family. Renner suffered a heart attack three days after his wife died on their 60th wedding anniversary. He survived two years after a triple bypass surgery, but died of acute respiratory failure in 2014 at the age of 87. A naval executive officer conducted Renner's committal at sea, off the coast of Jacksonville, courtesy of Navy vessel U.S.S. Taylor.

== Artistic Expression ==
Often quoted saying that abstract art was "the biggest fraud of the century", Renner was deeply committed to realistic portrayals in both his oil and watercolor compositions, saying that a portrait was only complete when the subject, "jump[s] out of the canvas." Renner worked both from sittings and multiple photographs. He revealed his approach thus, "I paint my subjects from the inside out. The planes and masses then emerge first, before the details. The photos each represent different moods of my subjects–the challenge is to find the common denominator." Renner clarified in a local news story that, "People have said I have a lot of detail. In reality, I only paint a suggestion of detail, which gives an illusion of detail." Art critic of the Sun-Sentinel, Roger Hurlburt called Renner's work "slick and well wrought". He elaborated, "Renner's sultry colors envelop the eye without distracting the viewer from the representation." A curator of one of Renner's shows commented that his work was "'a crowd pleaser.'"
