= Kate Mulgrew =

American actress and author (born 1955)

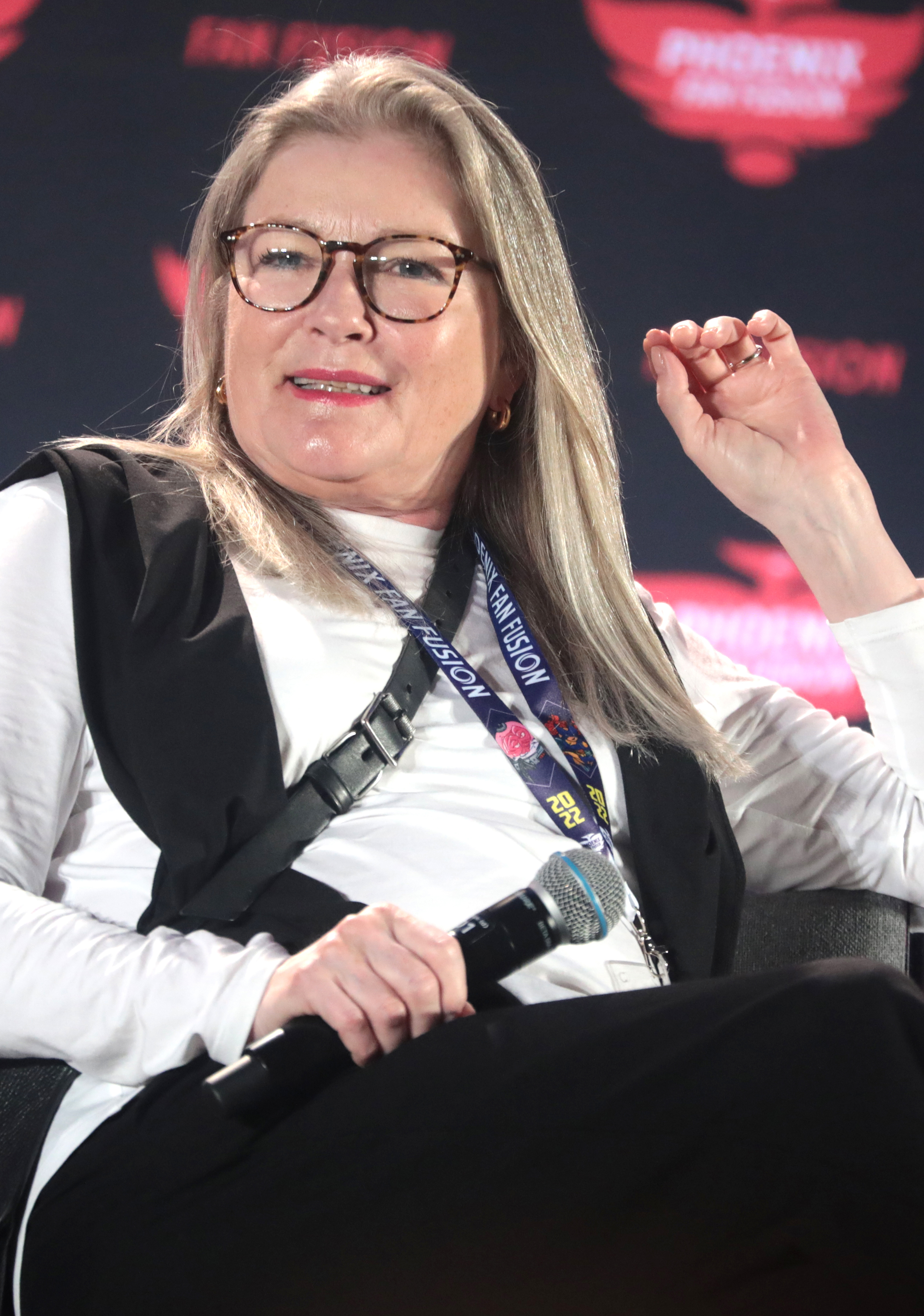
- Mulgrew in 2022
- Born: Katherine Kiernan Maria Mulgrew; April 29, 1955 (age 71); Dubuque, Iowa, U.S.
- Education: New York University
- Occupations: Actress; author
- Years active: 1975–present
- Known for: Star Trek: Voyager; Orange Is the New Black
- Spouses: Robert H. Egan (m. 1982; div. 1995) Tim Hagan (m. 1999; div. 2014)
- Children: 3

Katherine Kiernan Maria Mulgrew (born April 29, 1955) is an American actress and author. She is best known for playing Captain Kathryn Janeway in Star Trek: Voyager (1995–2001) and Red in Orange Is the New Black (2013–2019). She first came to attention in the role of Mary Ryan in the daytime soap opera Ryan's Hope.

Mulgrew is the recipient of a Critics' Choice Award, a Saturn Award, and an Obie Award, and has also received Golden Globe Award and Primetime Emmy Award nominations. She is a member of the Alzheimer's Association National Advisory Council and the voice of Cleveland's MetroHealth System. Beginning in 2021, Mulgrew reprised her role as Janeway in the animated series Star Trek: Prodigy, earning a nomination at the 4th Children's and Family Emmy Awards.

== Early life ==
Mulgrew was born on April 29, 1955, in Dubuque, Iowa, to Thomas James "T.J." Mulgrew Jr., a contractor, and Joan Virginia Mulgrew (née Kiernan), an artist and painter. She was the second of eight children. She attended Wahlert High School in Dubuque.

At the age of 17, Mulgrew was accepted at the Stella Adler Conservatory of Acting in New York, conjoined with New York University in New York City. She supported herself by working as a waitress. She left NYU after one year.

== Career ==
=== Earlier career (1975–1994) ===
Mulgrew's early career included portraying Susan in the ABC series The Wide World of Mystery (1975) episode, "Alien Lover," in which she played a recovering former sanitorium patient who meets a boyfriend in her television. She played Mary Ryan for two years in the ABC soap Ryan's Hope (1975). She became a fan favorite and remained associated with the show long after its cancellation. She remained friends with former co-star Ilene Kristen and presented a special Soap Opera Digest Award to Ryan's Hope creator Claire Labine in 1995. While in Ryan's Hope, she also played Emily Webb in the American Shakespeare Theatre production of Our Town in Stratford, Connecticut. She played ambitious country singer Garnet McGee in a November 1978 episode of Dallas. In 1979–1980, she played Kate Columbo in Mrs. Columbo, a spin-off of the detective series Columbo created specifically for her, which lasted 13 episodes.

In 1981, Mulgrew co-starred with Richard Burton and Nicholas Clay in the Arthurian love triangle Lovespell as Irish princess Isolt, who casts a spell on Mark, King of Cornwall, and his surrogate son, Tristan. In the same year she also co-starred with Pierce Brosnan in the six-hour miniseries Manions of America, about Irish immigrants in 19th-century America. In 1985, she appeared in Remo Williams: The Adventure Begins as Major Fleming. In 1986, she appeared in a run of Cheers episodes as Janet Eldridge. In 1987, she appeared in Throw Momma from the Train as Margaret, Billy Crystal's character's ex-wife.

In 1992, Mulgrew appeared on Murphy Brown as Hillary Wheaton, a Toronto-based anchorwoman brought in to replace Murphy during her maternity leave, but who turned out to have the same problem with alcoholism as Brown dealt with at the beginning of the series. Also in 1992, Mulgrew had a guest-starring role as a soap opera star in Murder, She Wrote, episode number 170, "Ever After". At around the same time she guest-starred in three episodes of Batman: The Animated Series as the terrorist Red Claw.

=== Star Trek: Voyager (1994–2001) ===
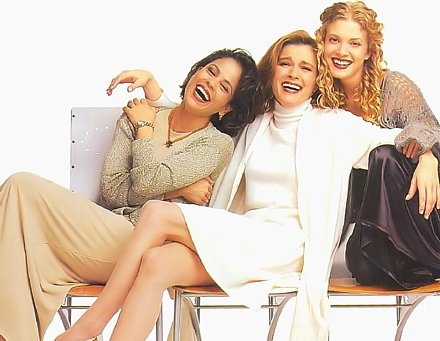
Kate Mulgrew with Voyager actresses Roxann Dawson and Jennifer Lien (1995)

In 1994, Mulgrew received a call to take the part of Captain Kathryn Janeway in Star Trek: Voyager. She had auditioned for the role (originally named Elizabeth Janeway) when producers announced casting. She submitted a videotaped audition which she made in New York City in August 1994. Unhappy with the tape, she auditioned in person a few weeks later. That day, film actress Geneviève Bujold was selected to play Janeway (suggesting Nicole as the character's new first name), but left the role after two days of filming, realizing that the amount of work required for an episodic television show was too demanding. Mulgrew was then offered the role, which she accepted, and later suggested Kathryn as the character's final first name.

Mulgrew made history in the Star Trek franchise when she became the first female captain as a series regular in a leading role. Voyager was the first show broadcast on the new UPN channel, the only series renewed after the channel's first programming season, and its only show to run for seven seasons. Mulgrew won the Saturn Award for "Best TV Actress" in 1998 for her performances as Janeway.

Mulgrew voiced the character of Janeway for various Star Trek video games: Star Trek: Captain's Chair, a virtual-reality tour of various Starfleet vessels for home computers; the Star Trek: Voyager – Elite Force series; Star Trek: Legacy, which featured all of the captains up to that point (2006); and Star Trek Online.

About her years on Voyager, Mulgrew said:

I'm proud of it. It was difficult; it was hard work. I'm proud of the work because I think I made some minor difference in women in science. I grew to really love Star Trek: Voyager, and out of a cast of nine, I've made three great friends, I managed to raise two children. I think, "It's good. I used myself well."

Speaking about the best and worst part about playing a Star Trek captain, she said:

The best thing was simply the privilege and the challenge of being able to take a shot at the first female captain, transcending stereotypes that I was very familiar with. I was able to do that in front of millions of viewers. That was a remarkable experience—and it continues to resonate. The downside of that is also that it continues to resonate, and threatens to eclipse all else in one's long career if one does not up the ante and stay at it, in a way that may not ordinarily be necessary. I have to work at changing and constantly reinventing myself in a way that probably would not have happened had Star Trek not come along. I knew that going in, and I think that all of the perks attached to this journey have been really inexpressively great. So the negatives are small.

During Voyager, Mulgrew also played Titania in the animated series Gargoyles (with fellow Star Trek actors Marina Sirtis and Jonathan Frakes) and Victoria Riddler in the television film Riddler's Moon.

Since Voyager and her subsequent Star Trek appearances, Mulgrew has appeared at Star Trek conventions and events around the world.

She returned to voice the role of Janeway as a training hologram and the real Vice-Admiral Janeway (commanding the USS Dauntless and USS Voyager-A) in the animated series Star Trek: Prodigy.

=== After Voyager (2001–2012) ===
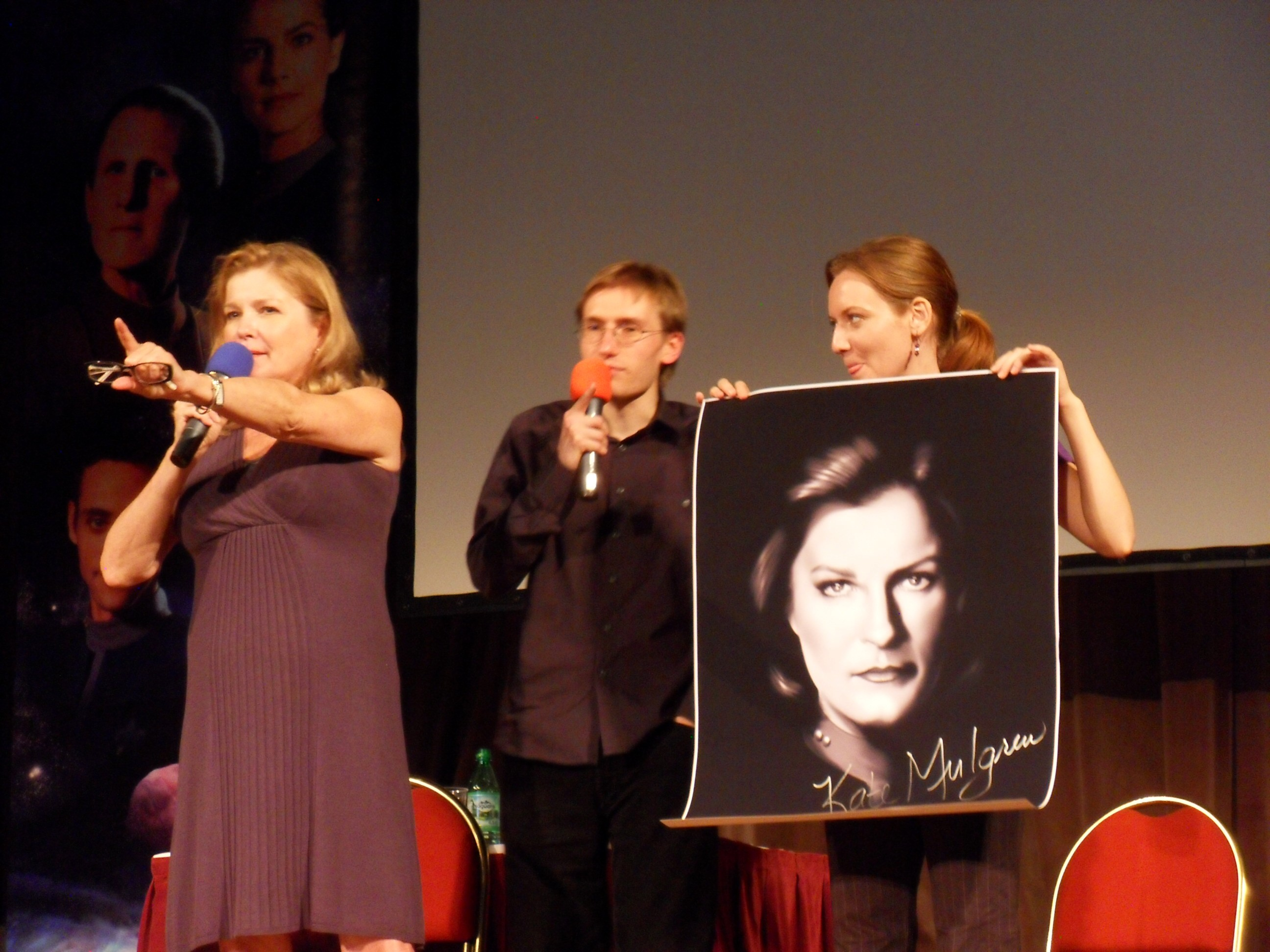
Mulgrew (l.) with an early photograph in Prague, 2011

When Voyager came to an end after seven full seasons, Mulgrew returned to theater, and in 2003 starred in a one-woman play called Tea at Five, a monologue reminiscence based on Katharine Hepburn's memoir Me: Stories of My Life. Tea at Five was a critical success and Mulgrew received two awards, one from Carbonell (Best Actress) and the other from Broadway.com (Audience Award for Favorite Solo Performance). Mulgrew kept active in doing voice-over work for video games, most notably voicing the mysterious Flemeth in the Dragon Age video game series, a role she described as "delicious".

Mulgrew returned to television in 2006, guest-starring in an episode of Law & Order: Special Victims Unit. Mulgrew performed in The Exonerated at the Riverside Studios in London, England.

In early 2007, she appeared in the NBC television series The Black Donnellys as Helen Donnelly, which lasted for one season. She also performed the lead role in an off-Broadway production called Our Leading Lady written by Charles Busch in which she earned a nomination from the Drama League for her performance. Also in that year, Mulgrew played Clytemnestra in New York for Charles L. Mee's Iphigenia 2.0. She won the Obie Award for outstanding performance.

In June 2008, Mulgrew appeared in Equus on Broadway, playing Hesther Saloman, a public official who is empathetic toward the play's central character. The play opened on September 5, 2008, for a limited 22-week engagement through February 8, 2009. Also in 2008, Mulgrew filmed the 30-minute courtroom drama The Response, which is based on actual transcripts of the Guantanamo Bay tribunals. It was researched and fully vetted in conjunction with the University of Maryland School of Law and was shot in three days. Mulgrew portrays Colonel Sims and the other cast members, the crew, and she agreed to defer their salaries to cover the production costs. The film has been screened at a number of sites and is available on DVD.

In 2009, Mulgrew appeared in the NBC medical series Mercy, playing the recurring role of Jeannie Flanagan (the mother of the show's lead, Veronica). Released in 2010, the film The Best and Brightest, a comedy based in the world of New York City's elite private kindergartens, featured Mulgrew as the Player's wife.

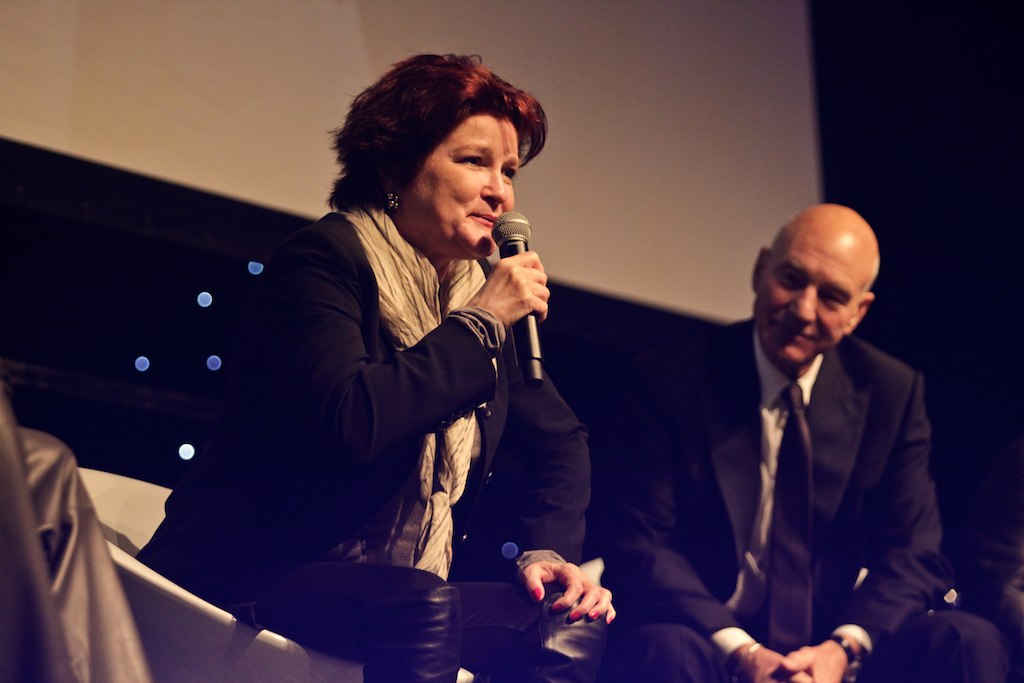
Mulgrew with Patrick Stewart appearing at Destination Star Trek London in 2012.

Also in 2010, she starred as Cleopatra in William Shakespeare's Antony and Cleopatra at Hartford Stage.

In 2011, Mulgrew appeared in the feature-length documentary The Captains. The film, written and directed by William Shatner, follows Shatner as he interviews each of the actors who succeeded him playing a lead-role Starfleet captain within the Star Trek franchise. During that same year, on another science-fiction series, she began a recurring guest-starring role on the third season of the series Warehouse 13, as the mother of one of the main characters.

From July 2011 to December 2013, Mulgrew appeared as the main cast member on Adult Swim's NTSF:SD:SUV:: as Kove, the leader of the titular terrorism-fighting unit and ex-wife of series lead Paul Scheer's character.

=== Orange Is the New Black and other work (2013–2019) ===
Mulgrew starred as inmate Galina "Red" Reznikov in the Netflix original series Orange Is the New Black, the role for which she was nominated for her first Primetime Emmy Award in 2014. The popular character was re-signed for seasons two through seven. On working in the series, she was reunited with her Mercy co-star Taylor Schilling.

In 2014, Mulgrew narrated a documentary film, The Principle, that aims to promote the discredited idea of the geocentric model. Mulgrew said that she was misinformed as to the purpose of the documentary, going on to say "I am not a geocentrist, nor am I in any way a proponent of geocentrism... I do not subscribe to anything Robert Sungenis has written regarding science and history, and had I known of his involvement, would most certainly have avoided this documentary."

Mulgrew starred in the fall 2024 Off-Broadway production by the Irish Repertory Theatre of The Beacon by playwright Nancy Harris.

== Personal life ==
Mulgrew became pregnant while acting in the lead role of Mary Ryan in Ryan's Hope. "I was single, alone, and flooded with terror. But I knew I would have that baby", Mulgrew said. She placed her daughter for adoption three days after giving birth in 1977, then in later years, searched for her. "The first man who wanted to explore this with me", said Mulgrew, "was Tim Hagan, who later became my husband."

In 1998, Mulgrew received a call from the daughter she had placed for adoption. Her name is Danielle, and she had started searching for Mulgrew a year earlier. In her 2015 memoir Born with Teeth (which refers to Mulgrew having been born with a full set of neonatal teeth), Mulgrew tells of her reunion with her daughter in 2001. In 2019, Mulgrew released a second memoir titled How to Forget.

Mulgrew married Robert Egan in 1982. They have two children. The couple separated in 1993. Their divorce became final in 1995.

In an interview for a documentary in 2024, Mulgrew discussed the personal cost associated with "giving 150%...every day for seven years", stating that while her daughter has watched Voyager her two sons have never seen her work in Star Trek, speculating that it is their way of communicating the loss they felt due to her absence while playing Janeway.

Mulgrew married Tim Hagan, a former Ohio gubernatorial candidate and a former commissioner of Cuyahoga County, Ohio, in April 1999. In an interview on April 15, 2015, Mulgrew stated that she and Hagan were divorced in 2014.

Mulgrew is Catholic and an opponent of capital punishment. She has previously stated that she is an opponent of abortion and received an award from Feminists for Life, an anti-abortion feminist group and is quoted as saying, "Execution as punishment is barbaric and unnecessary", "Life is sacred to me on all levels", and "Abortion does not compute with my philosophy." However, following the U.S. Supreme Court's decision on Dobbs v. Jackson Women's Health Organization, Mulgrew came out with the following statement about women's choice:

"Choice is what lifts us above other animals. If that fundamental right is restricted or removed we are then reduced as a species.

For myself, abortion was not an alternative, but neither was the possibility of living in a society and under the jurisdiction of a coterie of aging Republican men who somehow think they can understand what it is to have a womb. They can't. We must fight for nationwide access to contraception, especially in communities where poverty and race dictate privation. Choice is the fundamental right of every human being, especially women and people who are able to give birth.

We also need more women on the Supreme Court, and we need the conversation between men and women to be better curated than it has ever been before."

Mulgrew is a rape survivor.

Mulgrew is a member of the National Advisory Committee of the Alzheimer's Association. Her mother, Joan Mulgrew, died on July 27, 2006, after a long battle with the disease.

== Filmography ==
Key
| † | Denotes films that have not yet been released |

=== Film ===
| Year | Title | Role | Notes |
|---|---|---|---|
| 1981 | Lovespell | Isolt | |
| 1982 | A Stranger Is Watching | Sharon Martin | |
| 1985 | Remo Williams: The Adventure Begins | Major Rayner Fleming | |
| 1987 | Throw Momma from the Train | Margaret Donner | |
| 1992 | Round Numbers | Judith Schweitzer | |
| 1994 | Camp Nowhere | Rachel Prescott | |
| 1995 | Captain Nuke and the Bomber Boys | Mrs. Pescoe | |
| 2002 | Star Trek: Nemesis | Admiral Kathryn Janeway | Cameo |
| 2004 | Star Trek: The Experience – Borg Invasion 4D | Admiral Kathryn Janeway | |
| 2005 | Perception | Mary | |
| 2008 | The Response | Colonel Simms | Short film |
| 2010 | The Best and the Brightest | The Player's Wife | |
| 2012 | Flatland 2: Sphereland | Over-Sphere | |
| 2014 | The Principle | Narrator | Documentary |
| 2014 | Divine Discontent: Charles Proteus Steinmetz | Narrator | Documentary |
| 2016 | Drawing Home | Edith Morse Robb | |
| 2025 | Elio | Voyager 1 Exhibit Narrator | Cameo |

=== Television ===
| Year | Title | Role | Notes |
|---|---|---|---|
| 1975 | The Wide World of Mystery | Susan | Episode: "Alien Lover" |
| 1975–1978 | Ryan's Hope | Mary Ryan Fenelli | Main role |
| 1976 | The American Woman: Portraits of Courage | Deborah Sampson | Television film |
| 1978 | The Word | Tony Nicholson | Television film |
| 1978 | Dallas | Garnet McGee | Episode: "Triangle" |
| 1979 | Jennifer: A Woman's Story | Joan Russell | Television film |
| 1979–1980 | Mrs. Columbo | Kate Callahan Columbo | 13 episodes |
| 1980 | A Time for Miracles | Mother Elizabeth Bayley Seton | Television film |
| 1981 | The Manions of America | Rachel Clement | 3 episodes |
| 1984 | Jessie | Maureen McLaughlin | Episode: "McLaughlin's Flame" |
| 1986 | St. Elsewhere | Helen O'Casey | 2 episodes |
| 1986 | Cheers | Janet Eldridge | 3 episodes |
| 1986 | Carly Mills | Carly Mills | Television film |
| 1986 | My Town | Laura Adams | Television film |
| 1987 | Roses Are for the Rich | Kendall Murphy | Television film |
| 1987 | Hotel | Leslie Chase | Episode: "Reservations" |
| 1987–1994 | Murder, She Wrote | Sonny Grier/Joanna Rollins/Maude Gillis | 3 episodes |
| 1988 | Roots: The Gift | Hattie Carraway | Television film |
| 1988–1989 | HeartBeat | Joanne Halloran | 18 episodes |
| 1991 | Daddy | Sarah Watson | Television film |
| 1991 | Fatal Friendship | Sue Bradley | Television film |
| 1991–1992 | Man of the People | Mayor Lisbeth Chardin | 10 episodes |
| 1992 | Murphy Brown | Hillary Wheaton | Episode: "On the Rocks" |
| 1992 | The Pirates of Dark Water | Cressa | Voice, 4 episodes |
| 1992–1995 | Batman: The Animated Series | Red Claw | Voice, 3 episodes |
| 1993 | For Love and Glory | Antonia Doyle | Television film |
| 1994 | Mighty Max | Isis | Voice, episode: "The Mommy's Hand" |
| 1994–1995 | Aladdin | Queen Hippsodeth | Voice, 2 episodes |
| 1995–2001 | Star Trek: Voyager | Kathryn Janeway | 172 episodes |
| 1996 | Gargoyles | Titania / Anastasia Renard | Voice, 4 episodes |
| 1998 | Riddler's Moon | Victoria Riddler | Television film |
| 2006 | Law & Order: Special Victims Unit | Donna Geysen | Episode: "Web" |
| 2007 | The Black Donnellys | Helen Donnelly | 9 episodes |
| 2009–2010 | Mercy | Mrs. Jeannie Flanagan | 10 episodes |
| 2011–2013 | Warehouse 13 | Jane Lattimer | 6 episodes |
| 2011–2013 | NTSF:SD:SUV:: | Kove | 34 episodes |
| 2013–2019 | Orange Is the New Black | Galina "Red" Reznikov | 85 episodes |
| 2015 | American Dad! | June Rosewood | Voice, episode: "A Star Is Reborn" |
| 2015 | I Live with Models | Joanna Vermouth | Episode: "Editor" |
| 2015 | Teenage Mutant Ninja Turtles | General Zera | Voice, episode: "Half Shell Heroes: Blast to the Past" |
| 2017–2018 | Stretch Armstrong and the Flex Fighters | Dr. C. | Voice, 5 episodes |
| 2019 | Mr. Mercedes | Alma Lane | 9 episodes |
| 2019–2021 | Infinity Train | The Cat / Samantha | Voice, 9 episodes |
| 2021–2024 | Star Trek: Prodigy | Kathryn Janeway | Voice, 40 episodes |
| 2022 | The First Lady | Susan Sher | 4 episodes |
| 2022 | The Man Who Fell to Earth | Drew Finch | 7 episodes |
| 2022 | Dogs in Space | Mavis | Voice, episode: "Mistaken Id-ED-ity" |
| 2022 | Bubble Guppies | Felina Meow | Voice, episode: "Puppy Girl and Super Pup!" |
| 2022 | Flowers in the Attic: The Origin | Mrs. Steiner | 3 episodes |
| 2023 | The Magnificent Meyersons | Dr Terri Meyerson | Television film |
| 2025 | Dope Thief | Theresa Bowers | 8 episodes |
| 2025–2026 | The Bad Guys: The Series | Serpentina | Voice; 4 episodes |
| 2026 | Invincible | Domina | Voice; episode: "Hurm" |
| TBA | The Galway Bay Murders † | Nora Savage | Lead role; filming in Ireland in 2026 |

=== Theater ===
| Year | Title | Role | Notes |
|---|---|---|---|
| 1975 | Our Town | Emily Webb | American Shakespeare Theater, Stratford, Connecticut |
| 1976 | Absurd Person Singular | Eva Jackson | |
| 1977 | Uncommon Women and Others | Kate Quin | Eugene O'Neill Theater Center |
| 1978 | Othello | Desdemona | Hartman Theater Company |
| 1980 | Chapter Two | Jennie Malone | Coachlight Dinner Theater |
| 1981–1982 | Another Part of the Forest | Regina Hubbard | Seattle Repertory Theater |
| 1982 | Major Barbara | Major Barbara Undershaft | Seattle Repertory Theater |
| 1982 | Cat on a Hot Tin Roof | Margaret | Syracuse Stage, New York |
| 1983 | The Ballad of Soapy Smith | Kitty Strong | Seattle Repertory Theater |
| 1984 | The Philadelphia Story | Tracy Lord | Alaska Repertory Theater |
| 1984 | The Misanthrope | Celimene | Seattle Repertory Theater |
| 1985 | Measure for Measure | Isabella | Center Theater Group, Los Angeles |
| 1986 | Hedda Gabler | Hedda Gabler | Center Theater Group, Los Angeles |
| 1986 | The Real Thing | Charlotte | Center Theater Group, Los Angeles |
| 1987 | The Film Society | Nan Sinclair | The Los Angeles Theater Center |
| 1989 | Titus Andronicus | Tamora | New York Shakespeare Festival |
| 1990 | Aristocrats | Alice | Center Theater Group, Los Angeles |
| 1992 | What the Butler Saw | Mrs. Prentice | La Jolla Playhouse |
| 1993 | Black Comedy | Clea | Roundabout Theater Company, New York |
| 2002 | Dear Liar | Mrs Patrick Campbell | Youngstown State University |
| 2003 | Tea at Five | Katharine Hepburn | |
| 2004 | The Royal Family | Julie Cavendish | Ahmanson Theatre, Los Angeles |
| 2004 | Tea at Five | Katharine Hepburn | |
| 2004 | Mary Stuart | Mary Stuart | Classic Stage Company, New York |
| 2005 | Tea at Five | Katharine Hepburn | |
| 2006 | The Exonerated | Sunny Jacobs | Riverside Studios, London, England |
| 2007 | Our Leading Lady | Laura Keene | Manhattan Theater Club at New York City Center |
| 2007 | Iphigenia | Clytemnestra | Signature Theater Company |
| 2008 | Farfetched Fables and The Fascinating Foundling | Anastasia | Project Shaw Reading - The Players Club - New York |
| 2008 | The American Dream and The Sandbox | Mommy | Cherry Lane Theater, New York |
| 2008–2009 | Equus | Hesther Saloman | Broadhurst Theater, New York |
| 2010 | Antony and Cleopatra | Cleopatra | Hartford Stage |
| 2013 | Somewhere Fun | Rosemary Rappaport | Vineyard Theatre, New York |
| 2019 | The Half-Life of Marie Curie | Hertha Ayrton | Minetta Lane Theater |
| 2024 | The Beacon | Beiv | Irish Repertory Theatre |

=== Video games ===
| Year | Title | Role |
|---|---|---|
| 1997 | Star Trek: Captain's Chair | Captain Kathryn Janeway |
| 2000 | Star Trek: Voyager – Elite Force | Captain Kathryn Janeway |
| 2002 | Run Like Hell | Dr. Mek |
| 2003 | Lords of EverQuest | Lady Kreya |
| 2006 | Star Trek: Legacy | Admiral Kathryn Janeway |
| 2009 | Dragon Age: Origins | Flemeth |
| 2011 | Dragon Age II | Flemeth |
| 2014 | Dragon Age: Inquisition | Flemeth |
| 2017 | Augmented Empire | Jules Avalon |
| 2022 | Star Trek Online | Admiral Janeway / Marshal Janeway |
| 2022 | Star Trek Prodigy: Supernova | Hologram Janeway |

== Awards and nominations ==
| Year | Association | Category | Nominated work | Result |
|---|---|---|---|---|
| 1980 | Golden Globe Awards | Best Actress – Television Series Drama | Mrs. Columbo | Nominated |
| 1992 | Tracey Humanitarian Award | Herself | Murphy Brown | Won |
| 1998 | Satellite Awards | Best Actress – Television Series Drama | Star Trek: Voyager | Won |
| 1998 | Saturn Awards | Best Actress on Television | Star Trek: Voyager | Won |
| 1999 | Saturn Awards | Best Actress on Television | Star Trek: Voyager | Nominated |
| 2000 | Saturn Awards | Best Actress on Television | Star Trek: Voyager | Nominated |
| 2001 | Saturn Awards | Best Actress on Television | Star Trek: Voyager | Nominated |
| 2003 | Broadway.com | Audience Award for Favorite Solo Performance | Tea at Five | Nominated |
| 2003 | Outer Critics Circle Awards | Outstanding Solo Performance | Tea at Five | Nominated |
| 2003 | Lucille Lortel Awards | Outstanding Lead Actress | Tea at Five | Nominated |
| 2004 | Carbonell Awards | Best Actress | Tea at Five | Won |
| 2007 | Drama League Award | Distinguished Performance | Our Leading Lady | Nominated |
| 2008 | Obie Award | Outstanding Performance | Iphigenia 2.0 | Won |
| 2014 | Critics' Choice Television Awards | Best Supporting Actress in a Comedy Series | Orange Is the New Black | Won |
| 2014 | Satellite Awards | Best Cast – Television Series | Orange Is the New Black | Won |
| 2014 | Primetime Emmy Award | Outstanding Supporting Actress in a Comedy Series | Orange Is the New Black | Nominated |
| 2015 | Screen Actors Guild Awards | Outstanding Performance by an Ensemble in a Comedy Series | Orange Is the New Black | Won |
| 2016 | Screen Actors Guild Awards | Outstanding Performance by an Ensemble in a Comedy Series | Orange Is the New Black | Won |
| 2017 | Screen Actors Guild Awards | Outstanding Performance by an Ensemble in a Comedy Series | Orange Is the New Black | Won |
| 2018 | Screen Actors Guild Awards | Outstanding Performance by an Ensemble in a Comedy Series | Orange Is the New Black | Nominated |
| 2020 | Drama League Award | Distinguished Performance | The Half-Life of Marie Curie | Nominated |
| 2021 | Saturn Awards | Best Guest Starring Role on Television | Mr. Mercedes | Nominated |
| 2025 | Children's and Family Emmy Awards | Outstanding Multiple Voice Role Performer in a Children's or Young Teen Program | Star Trek: Prodigy | Nominated |

== Publications ==
- Mulgrew, Kate (2015). Born with Teeth: A Memoir. New York: Little, Brown and Company. ISBN 978-0-316-33431-0.
- Mulgrew, Kate (2019). How to Forget: A Daughter's Memoir. New York: William Morrow and Company. ISBN 978-0-0628-4684-6.
