= MIA Hunters =

American nonprofit organization

MIA Hunters was a Minnesota-based volunteer nonprofit organization dedicated to finding and recovering the remains of lost American pilots air crew members missing in action from World War II. MIA Hunters organized at least 34 missions to China, Papua New Guinea, Vietnam, the Philippines, and elsewhere to locate the remains at crash sites and unmarked graves, without any charge to the families. They located a number of aircraft associated with milestones in military history, among them the Doolittle Raid and Operation Tidal Wave.

== Foundation and operation ==
MIA Hunters was founded by Christopher Moon and his father Bryan Moon as a volunteer nonprofit organization that sought to find and facilitate the recovery of the remains of missing American World War II pilots and air crew members. Chris Moon was born in England as was his father Bryan, who was a former member of the Royal Air Force and a retired Northwest Airlines executive. Virtually all of their missions overseas and the work they performed was self-funded.

For two decades, MIA Hunters organized missions to places such as China, Papua New Guinea, and Romania, where they discovered the remains of several hundred airmen and soldiers. They would travel to the country where the soldier's aircraft was last located, hire scouts to find elders who might recall the crash location and then search the surrounding area. MIA Hunters would photograph the site, mark coordinates, record aircraft ID and forward all of it to the Joint POW/MIA Accounting Command, more precisely to the POW Central Identification Laboratory in Hawaii. The documentation of each crash site ended with a prayer written by Chris Moon for the fallen crew members, as well as for the hunters' own safe return.

== Doolittle expeditions ==
The Doolittle Raid is famous as the first American air raid to strike the Japanese archipelago in the Second World War. After bombing Tokyo, fourteen B-25 Mitchell bombers crashed in China on April 18, 1942.

In 1988, Bryan Moon and Doolittle's navigator, Hank Potter, went to China to see what they could find in the mountains south of Nanking. It led to the discovery of Dr. Shen Yen-chan, a local medical practitioner to whom the injured crew of No. 7 aircraft were brought to for medical attention in 1942. This motivated them to mount another expedition.

After twelve months of research, the Doolittle Raiders China Expedition arrived in Hangzhou in 1990. The 19-strong expedition included divers, pilots, and photographers. Villagers took them to the site where a B-25 had crashed. They obtained a parachute harness release from the body of one of the Doolittle Raiders. Some of the aluminum from the Doolittle aircraft was pounded into plates and other objects by the Chinese and recovered by the MIA Hunters.

On March 18, 1992, the members of China Zhejiang Delegation - five old men and women - were brought by Chris and Bryan Moon to the Wilson Center in Washington DC to meet eight members of the original Doolittle crew, the very same people they rescued in the Second World War. Here each Chinese villager was presented with medals made by the Moons commemorating their bravery. They were then invited to the White House to meet the President and toured the Pentagon, where President George H. W. Bush spoke at the commemoration of the 50th anniversary of the Doolittle Raid.

The MIA Hunters Doolittle mission in 1994 lasted three weeks, most of which was spent out at sea searching for bombers using side-scan sonar and magnetometers. During the expeditions to China between 1990 and 1994, MIA Hunters collected artifacts from four bombers.

Immediately after preparing a Veterans Day exhibit of artifacts from the Doolittle raid, which was displayed to the public in Palm Aire, Florida, Bryan Moon died in 2015, aged 87, and MIA Hunters ceased its active operation.

== Other missions ==
In the 1980s, Moon traveled to Romania and obtained new information about the pilots who participated in Operation Tidal Wave, an air attack of American bombers on oil refineries around the town of Ploiești in 1943.

The Moons and a team from MIA Hunters traveled to Papua New Guinea in 2006 to find and identify an American World War II bomber and its crew missing since 1943. They examined the crash site and collected small sections of the bomber and took photographs. They found the plane's construction number and serial number.

MIA Hunters went on several other expeditions to Papua New Guinea over the years in search of lost American pilots. These were the final years in which native eyewitnesses to the battles and crashes were still alive to be interviewed. In the period from 2006 and 2010, native scouts engaged by MIA Hunters found and documented 92 more crash sites for MIA Hunters, with 375 wrecks believed to be still undiscovered in the jungle. Positive identifications of several remains were made, with the final burials done at Arlington National Cemetery. At least one set of bones was matched to the DNA on an envelope their owner had licked more than half a century earlier.
