= Christopher Reynalds =

British child actor, motor racing driver (born 1952)

- Born: Christopher Peter Tempest Reynalds; 13 December 1952 (age 73); Hitchin, Hertfordshire, England
- Occupations: Actor, racing driver
- Spouse: Dawn L. Rowe

Christopher Peter Tempest Reynalds (born 13 December 1952) is a British child actor of the 1960s and 1970s, a former member of the National Theatre and a former Caterham 7 motor racing champion.

== Acting career ==
One of three brothers all of diminutive stature and who were all child actors, Chris Reynalds trained at the Barbara Speak Stage School and began his acting career in the 1968 film Oliver!. Other film appearances include Goodbye, Mr. Chips (1969) and playing Little Billy in Roald Dahl's film The Night Digger (1971) with Patricia Neal and Peter Sallis.

Reynalds' television work includes the 1968 Doctor Who episode The Mind Robber with Patrick Troughton. He played Bardell Jr. in the TV musical Pickwick (1969) with Harry Secombe, and in 1971 he played Alethorpe in an episode of the BBCs Play for Today called Alma Mater alongside Max Adrian and Hilda Braid. He also appeared in an episode of Tales of the Unexpected. He auditioned for and was offered the leading role in the 1971 sitcom Alexander the Greatest but the role went instead to Gary Warren, with whom Reynalds had appeared in the stage musical Mame.

His theatre work includes 'H', or Monologues at Front of Burning Cities (1969) for the National Theatre and starring Robert Lang; Peter Dennis in Mame (1969) at the Theatre Royal, Drury Lane and starring Ginger Rogers; The Lionel Touch (1969) starring Rex Harrison at the Lyric Theatre; and A Voyage Round My Father at the Haymarket Theatre (1971) and starring Alec Guinness and Jeremy Brett.

He married Dawn L Rowe in 1981 at Hitchin in Hertfordshire.

== Recent years ==
Because of his short stature (he is 5 feet 1 inch tall) in 2008 Reynalds appeared in the BBC series Doctor Who as a Sontaran in the episodes The Sontaran Strategem and The Poison Sky (2008). Similarly, he made a brief appearance as a wizard in Harry Potter and the Deathly Hallows – Part 2 (2011).

== Racing champion ==
In the early 1980s Reynalds began to race in Formula Ford 1600s, progressing to the Caterham 7 by the late 1990s, in which he raced in Europe, winning the 2004 Autosport Caterham Eurocup Championship at Brands Hatch. In 2005 he raced in the Caterham R400.
