= The Night Digger =

1971 British film by Alastair Reid

- original film poster for American release
- Directed by: Alastair Reid
- Screenplay by: Roald Dahl
- Based on: Nest in a Fallen Tree; 1967 novel by Joy Cowley
- Produced by: Alan D. Courtney; Norman S. Powell
- Starring: Patricia Neal; Pamela Brown; Nicholas Clay; Jean Anderson; Christopher Reynalds; Peter Sallis
- Cinematography: Alex Thomson
- Edited by: John Bloom
- Music by: Bernard Herrmann
- Production companies: Yongestreet Productions; Tactitus Productions
- Distributed by: Metro-Goldwyn-Mayer
- Release date: 12 May 1971 (U.S.)
- Running time: 98 minutes
- Country: United Kingdom
- Language: English

The Night Digger (aka The Road Builder) is a 1971 British horror thriller film directed by Alastair Reid and starring Patricia Neal, Pamela Brown and Nicholas Clay. The screenplay was by Roald Dahl based on the novel Nest in a Fallen Tree by Joy Cowley, about two women who are visited by a suspicious handy man.

== Plot ==
Maura Prince works part-time as a speech therapist and the rest of her time taking care of her blind, invalid mother, Edith. Billy Jarvis arrives, claiming he was sent there in place of a neighbor's nephew who was to live with the Princes and work in their garden. He ingratiates himself with Edith, who gives him Maura's bedroom and claims he must be a long-lost relative. Despite Maura's worries, Billy turns out to be a helpful assistant.

While attending church with Edith, Billy notices pretty, young nursery school teacher Mary Wingate. That night, while having psychotic flashbacks of being raped by women and taunted for impotency, Billy goes to her home and murders her, then buries her body at a road construction site. The Princes' neighbors discuss the murder, which is the seventh in a series of killings of women. A nurse visits Edith and warns that Edith's heart is very bad. Edith, impatient when Billy doesn't answer her calls, tries to climb the stairs to his room and has a heart attack. Maura rushes her to the hospital. The nurse, returning to check on Edith, finds Billy there alone. Gripped by another bout of psychosis, he follows the nurse home and murders her as well.

When Maura returns from the hospital, she almost catches Billy coming home from the murder. To placate her, Billy lies, claiming his mother died in a fire. He weeps, claims he often doesn't know what he is doing, and begs Maura never to betray him. The next day, Maura visits Edith at the hospital. Edith demands that Maura throw Billy out, but Maura tells off Edith instead and decides to leave with Billy.

Maura takes all her savings, changes her wardrobe and hairstyle, and returns home to tell Billy that she loves him. After consummating their love, the two run off to Scotland, where they buy a sheep farm together. After some months have passed, Billy sees a young female neighbor looking for her dog, and Maura realizes what is happening when psychosis grips him later that day.

Hours afterward, Billy returns to the farm, psychotic. Maura realizes he has killed again, and silently confronts him in tears. Realizing he has broken Maura's heart, Billy drives off a cliff on his motorcycle, committing suicide. Maura, standing on the cliff face, silently mouths "I love you."

== Cast ==
- Patricia Neal as Maura Prince
- Pamela Brown as Mrs. Edith Prince
- Nicholas Clay as Billy Jarvis
- Jean Anderson as Mrs. Millicent McMurtrey
- Graham Crowden as Mr. Bolton
- Yootha Joyce as Mrs. Palafox
- Peter Sallis as Reverend Rupert Palafox
- Brigit Forsyth as district nurse
- Sebastian Breaks as Dr. Ronnie Robinson
- Christopher Reynalds as young Billy
- Sibylla Kay as whore

== Production ==
Roald Dahl wrote the script especially for his wife Neal, who was recovering from a series of strokes that almost killed her in 1965. He sent the script to a number of directors including Lindsay Anderson, William Friedkin, Lindsay Russell and Robert Altman. Eventually he chose Alistair Reid, who had worked extensively in theatre and television.

Patricia Neal later wrote "I received no salary for it. It simply would not have been made had I demanded anything close to my fee. Both Roald and I took expenses only, but would have shared in the profits had there been any."

Dahl struck a deal with Yongestreet Productions, who raised money from MGM. The producers insisted he fire his attached producer, Allen Hodshire. Producer Norman Powell, son of actor Dick Powell, came aboard instead.

It was the first film for Nicholas Clay after his extensive stage experience.

Filming started 28 September 1970 and took eight weeks. It mostly took place at Twickenham Studios, in Cornwall, and in an old mansion on the way to Windsor Castle. Neal was accompanied during filming by Valerie Griffith, who had helped her recover from the stroke. Neal wrote "It was a very difficult picture for me. Valerie came to help with the lines, but my coworkers did not have the generous spirit of Jack Albertson and Martin Sheen (with whom she had made The Subject Was Roses) and I sensed their impatience when I stumbled. I also remember distinctly, on more than one occasion, hearing them making fun of me. Brain-damaged people can sense when someone is mocking them. We grow antennae."

== Reception ==
=== Box office ===
The film was a box-office failure. Dahl said "it was so badly made it ran for just a few days in New York and then faded." (Alistair Reid responded "Mr Dahl is a very complicated customer. The director should be the boss on the set. If he was at the beck and call of the scriptwriter life would be intolerable. The script is merely the blueprint for the film."

Neal wrote the film "brings back hard memories, and I didn't get a nickel for doing it."

Neal disliked the movie, calling it "pornography." Dahl thought the book was "a fine first novel" but claimed "the director messed that one up... Pat's lovely but the film's a mess."

Alistair Reid later claimed the film "got very, very good reviews in America and has only been seen in that country. It’s not been shown in this country [England] mainly because Patricia Neal, Roald Dahl and I all took deferred payments which would only come into being if the film opened in this country. So it is actually very much in their interests not to release the film in this country."

=== Critical ===
In a contemporary review, The New York Times wrote "It begs for empathy for its tortured principals, but despite the clearly dedicated contributions of Patricia Neal, Roald Dahl...Pamela Brown and a young newcomer, Nicholas Clay, the strain on credibility is a good deal more notable than the impact on the emotions"; Variety praised the acting but called the film "only moderately successful."

More recently, a reviewer for DVD Talk wrote "The Night Digger doesn't carry much of a reputation, but I found it highly unusual, and more than satisfying."

Cinema Retro called it "an underrated gem".

The Radio Times stated "director Alastair Reid's neo–Grand Guignol chamber piece exudes a peculiar fascination."
