= The Girl in Black Stockings =

1957 film by Howard W. Koch

- Directed by: Howard W. Koch
- Written by: Richard Landau
- Based on: "Wanton Murder"; 1954 short story in Death Under the Table by Peter Godfrey
- Produced by: Aubrey Schenck (executive producer)
- Starring: Lex Barker; Anne Bancroft; Mamie Van Doren
- Cinematography: William Margulies
- Edited by: John F. Schreyer
- Music by: Les Baxter
- Production company: A Bel-Air Production
- Distributed by: United Artists
- Release date: September 24, 1957 (U.S.); copyright 1956
- Running time: 73 minutes
- Country: United States
- Language: English

The Girl in Black Stockings is an American B movie mystery film released by United Artists in 1957. Directed by Howard W. Koch, it stars Lex Barker, Anne Bancroft, and Mamie Van Doren.

== Plot ==
A lodge in Kanab, Utah, is where Los Angeles lawyer David Hewson goes for a peaceful vacation. He is quickly attracted to Beth Dixon, a switchboard operator and a personal assistant to lodge owner Edmund Parry.

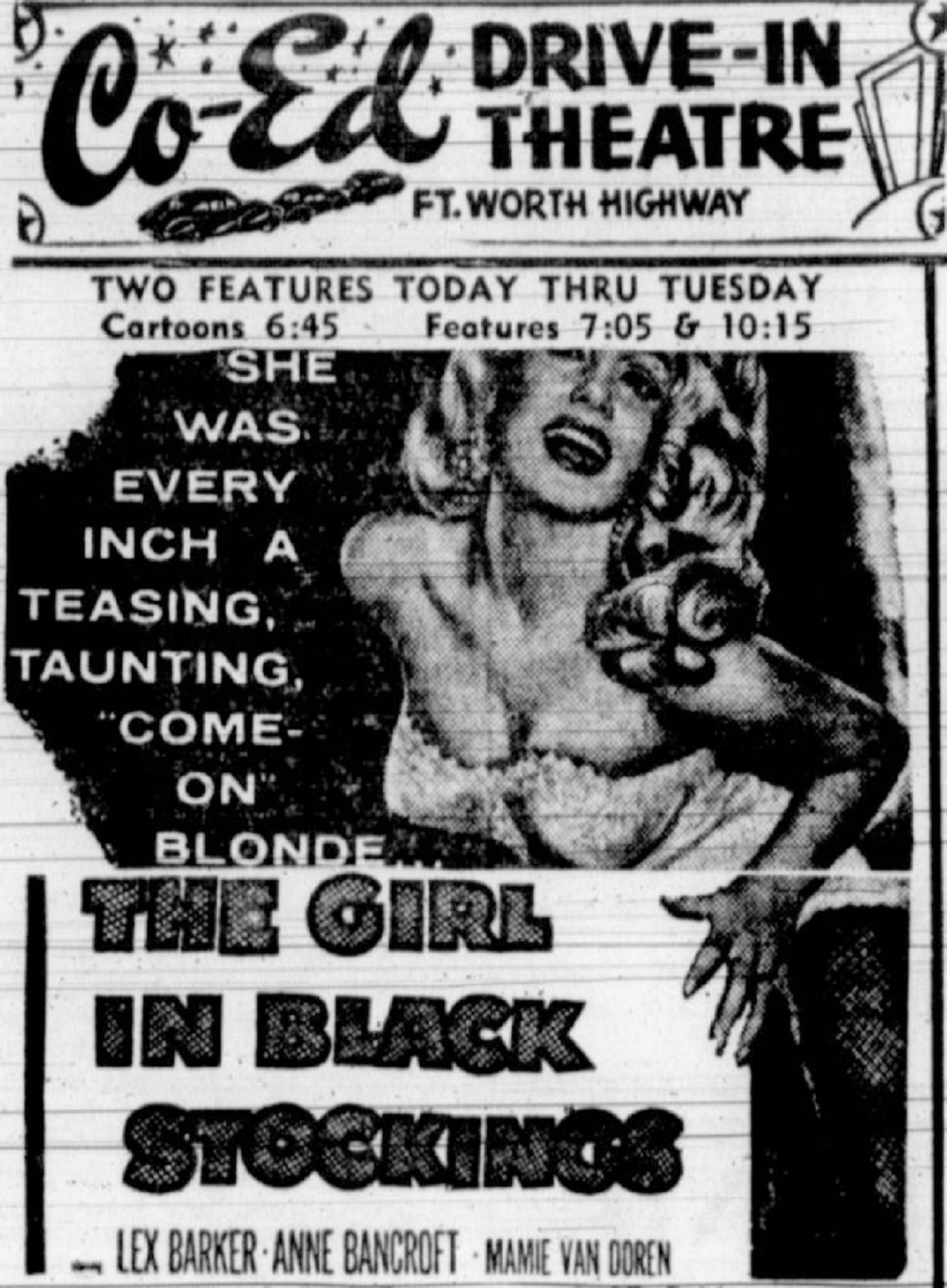
Drive-in advertisement from 1958

The murder of playgirl Marsha Morgan, her throat cut, disrupts the peace and quiet. Sheriff Holmes begins the investigation, starting with the wheelchair-using Parry, who admits to hating the dead woman, and Parry's possessive sister Julia, who helps him run the lodge. It turns out David once dated Morgan as well.

A new guest, Joseph Felton, checks in. The sheriff's suspects also include guests Norman Grant, a drunken actor, and his ambitious girlfriend, Harriet Ames. A missing kitchen knife believed to be the murder weapon is found by Indian Joe, who works at the lodge.

Beth eavesdrops on a phone call Felton makes from his room. She overhears him speaking to a man named Prentiss. Felton is later found killed by drowning, and it turns out he was a private detective. David becomes more and more convinced the Parrys are behind all this. Ames is seen kissing Edmund Parry, which does not please Edmund's sister or Grant. Shortly thereafter, Ames is brutally murdered.

To his shock, David arrives as Beth holds a knife to Julia Parry's bloody throat, claiming to have stabbed her in self-defense. It turns out, however, that Prentiss is Beth's husband, and he had hired the private investigator Felton to find the psychologically disturbed Beth, who is responsible for all the murders.

== Cast ==
- Lex Barker as David Hewson
- Anne Bancroft as Beth
- Mamie Van Doren as Harriet Ames
- John Dehner as Sheriff Holmes
- Ron Randell as Edmund Parry
- Marie Windsor as Julia Parry
- John Holland as Norman Grant
- Diana Vandervlis as Louise Miles
- Richard H. Cutting as Dr. Aiken
- Larry Chance as Joe
- Gene O'Donnell as Felton
- Norman Leavitt as Amos
- Gerald Frank as Frankie
- Stuart Whitman as Prentiss
- David Dwight as Judge Walters
- Karl MacDonald as Deputy
- Dan Blocker as Bartender
- Mark Bennett as Brackett

== Production ==
The movie was based on the story Wanton Murder by South African author Peter Godfrey that was set in Transvaal. The film rights were sold through Godfrey's American-based sister, Vonne Godfrey. The filmmakers relocated the story to Utah.

The movie's working title was Black Stockings. It was filmed on location in the small Utah city of Kanab; the lodge in the film is the real-life Parry Lodge in Kanab, which had often served to house movie crews filming in the area. Filming also took place at Three Lakes and the Moqui Cave in Utah and in Fredonia, Arizona. The filmmakers had also shot the western film Quincannon, Frontier Scout (1956) in the area.

The Girl in Black Stockings was Van Doren's first film after the birth of her son and her subsequent release from Universal.

Production began in July 1956.

Like much of Bel-Air's output, The Girl in Black Stockings was a low-budget exploitation film intended to be the second feature shown at a theater.

== Reception ==
The film took 14 months to be released. Variety called it a "welcome addition to the general program market... Richard Landau’s well-developed screenplay has received good direction from Howard W. Koch, and the various technical contributions all measure up. Deserving a nod for the overall result is exec producer Aubrey Schenck."

== See also ==
- List of American films of 1957
