= Lovespell =

- Directed by: Tom Donovan
- Written by: Claire Labine
- Produced by: Tom Hayes; Douglas Hughes; Claire Labine; Thomas H. Ryan
- Starring: Richard Burton; Kate Mulgrew; Nicholas Clay; Cyril Cusack; Niall O'Brien
- Cinematography: Richard H. Kline
- Edited by: Russell Lloyd
- Music by: Paddy Moloney
- Production company: Paramount Pictures
- Distributed by: John Lucas Ltd
- Release date: December 1981
- Running time: 97 minutes
- Countries: Ireland, United Kingdom
- Language: English

Lovespell is a 1981 fantasy romantic tragedy film featuring Richard Burton as King Mark of Cornwall. It was directed by Tom Donovan. It is based on the classic saga of Tristan and Isolde.

== Production ==
Filmed in Ireland in 1979 as Tristan and Isolde this film was eventually released for limited screenings in theaters in 1981 as Lovespell.

Harry Hamlin auditioned for the film as well as Clash of the Titans opting to do the latter so he could work with Laurence Olivier. Nicholas Clay also read for the role of Perseus in Clash of the Titans but when Hamlin got the role, Clay ended up as Tristan in Lovespell.

== Plot ==
Lovespell is based around a love triangle between King Mark of Cornwall (Richard Burton), Isolt (Kate Mulgrew), and Tristan (Nicholas Clay). Mark discovers Isolt's love for Tristan, and banishes Tristan. However, while being away, Tristan is mortally wounded. Isolt persuades Mark to go and take Tristan back to Cornwall. Mark says if he returns casting white sails Tristan is alive and if they are black Tristan is dead. Mark returns with Tristan barely alive with white sails, but casts black sails when Tristan reveals his plans to run away with Isolt as soon as he has recovered. This causes Isolt to kill herself by throwing herself off the White Cliffs of Dover. Mark helps Tristan swim to the shore, and as Tristan and Isolt's hands touch they both die, while Mark, knee deep in the water, looks on.

== Cast ==
- Richard Burton as King Mark of Cornwall
- Kate Mulgrew as Isolt
- Nicholas Clay as Tristan
- Cyril Cusack as Gormond of Ireland
- Geraldine Fitzgerald as Bronwyn
- Niall Toibin as Andred
- Diana Van der Vlis as Alix
- Niall O'Brien as Corvenal
- Kathryn Dowling as Yseult of the White Hand
- John Jo Brooks as Father Colm
- Trudy Hayes as Anne
- John Scanlon as Bishop
- Bobby Johnson as William the Guard
- John Labine as Eoghanin
