= Parker Playhouse =

Theater in Fort Lauderdale, Florida, United States

- Interactive map of Parker Playhouse
- Address: 707 NE 8th Street; Fort Lauderdale, Florida; United States
- Coordinates: 26.1342°N 80.1362°W
- Operator: Performing Arts Center Authority
- Capacity: 1,191

Construction
- Opened: February 6, 1967

Website
- www.parkerplayhouse.com

The Parker Playhouse is a 1,147-seat theatre in Fort Lauderdale, Florida.

The Playhouse was established by Dr. Louis Parker. The curtain rose for the first time on February 6, 1967 as E.G. Marshall and Dennis O'Keefe starred in Neil Simon’s The Odd Couple. Parker teamed with Broadway impresario Zev Buffman, who was also producing shows in Miami at the Coconut Grove Playhouse, to offer productions featuring many of the top theater artists of the day. Parker Playhouse has produced continuously for nearly 40 years..

Today, (2006) the Parker Playhouse is controlled by the Performing Arts Center Authority ("PACA") – the governing body that oversees the Broward Center for the Performing Arts which manages the theater and provides the programming on its stage.

The Broward Performing Arts Foundations raised $30 million to renovate the theater. Parker Playhouse re-opened in September of 2021, featuring an expanded lobby, renovated lounges and bathrooms, and numerous upgrades to the theater's lighting, electrical, and air systems. In addition to the upgrades, some of the theaters existing artwork was preserved, such as the East and West Lobbies' rotundas, which were painted by artist Donald Renner in 1983. The theater hosts concerts, comedy shows, theater productions, dance, and family events in partnership with Broward County Schools.
