= Diana Van der Vlis =

Canadian-American actress (1935–2001)

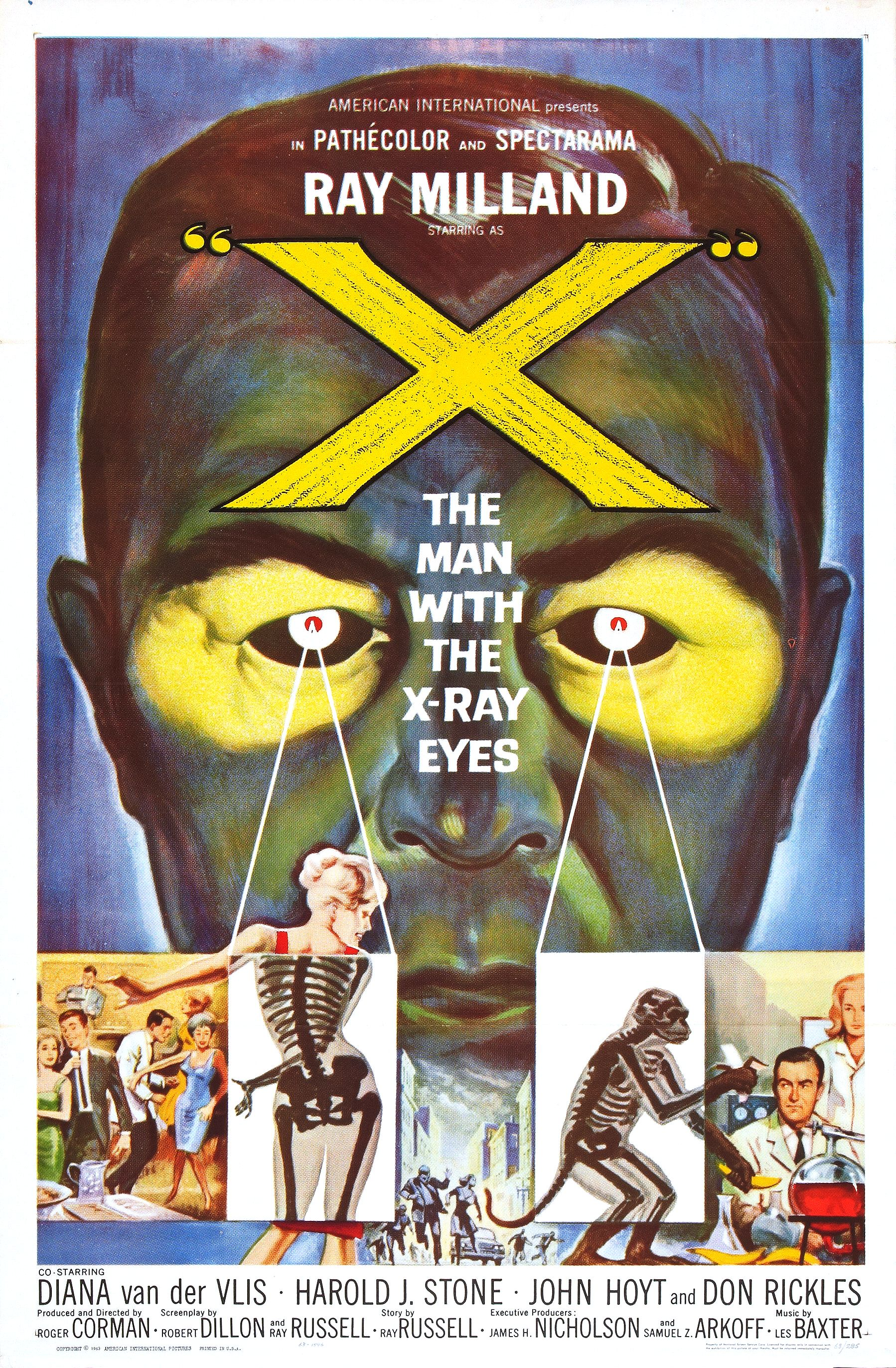
- Poster for X: The Man with the X-ray Eyes (1963) with Van der Vlis at bottom
- Born: Diana Mae Van Der Vlis; June 9, 1935; Toronto, Ontario, Canada
- Died: October 22, 2001 (aged 66); Missoula, Montana, U.S.
- Other names: Diana Vandervlis; Diana van der Vlis; Diana Van Der Vlis
- Years active: 1954–1989
- Spouse: Roger Donald (19??–2001)
- Children: 2

Diana Van der Vlis (June 9, 1935 – October 22, 2001) was a Canadian-American stage, screen and television actress best known for her characters Dr. Nell Beaulac (1975–76) on the ABC soap opera Ryan's Hope and Kate Hathaway Prescott on the soap opera Where the Heart Is. Two other roles on daytime dramas that she played were Sherry Rowan (1987–89) on Ryan's Hope and Susan Ames Carver on The Secret Storm, when she was a substitute for Judy Lewis in the role.

Van der Vlis went to university in Winnipeg, studied at the Royal Academy of Dramatic Arts (RADA) in London and acted in Canada, living in both Clarkson, Mississauga, Ontario and Vancouver, British Columbia, before booking a role in the Utah-filmed B-movie The Girl in Black Stockings (1957), and moving to New York City in 1956. On arrival, she auditioned for an NBC drama program; there, a page suggested that she try the Baum-Newborn Theatrical Agency.

Within six weeks of arriving in New York City, she was cast in the Broadway show The Happiest Millionaire. While in rehearsals, she reportedly was offered a three-picture non-exclusive film deal with an independent studio and a lead role in a weekly half-hour NBC program filmed in Paris. Her debut, opposite Walter Pidgeon, proved to be a hit. She toured with the show, including to Toronto.

Her subsequent Broadway productions include leading or featured roles in Comes a Day, A Mighty Man Is He, A Shot in the Dark, On an Open Road and The Waltz of the Toreadors.

Diana can be seen in the movies X: The Man with the X-ray Eyes (1963), The Incident (1967), The Swimmer (1968) and Lovespell (1981). She also appears in a 1967 TV film Ghostbreakers.

Van der Vlis guest-starred on numerous primetime TV shows, including Kraft Theatre, Naked City, Tactic, The United States Steel Hour, DuPont Show of the Month, The DuPont Show of the Week, Alfred Hitchcock Presents, Great Ghost Tales, Brenner, Checkmate, East Side/West Side, Route 66, Dr. Kildare, Flipper, Mr. Broadway, The Defenders, Twelve O'Clock High (as the "commander's pretty wife"), The Invaders, The Man from U.N.C.L.E., T.H.E. Cat, The F.B.I., and The Fugitive.

She was a naturalized U.S. citizen and mother of actor Matthew Powers.

On October 22, 2001, she died in Montana due to a cardiac arrest caused by a pulmonary embolism, following a brief illness.

== Filmography ==
Year	Title	Role	Notes
1957	The Girl in Black Stockings	Louise Miles	
1961	Alfred Hitchcock Presents	Elise Taylor	Season 6 Episode 37: "Make My Death Bed"
1963	X: The Man with the X-ray Eyes	Dr. Diane Fairfax	
1967	The Incident	Helen Wilks	
1968	The Swimmer	Helen Westerhazy	
1981	Lovespell	Alix	
