= Alma Mater (Play for Today) =

- Play for Today episode
- Episode no.: Series 1 Episode 11
- Directed by: James Ferman
- Written by: David Hodson
- Original air date: 7 January 1971

Episode chronology
← Previous "The Hallelujah Handshake"	Next → "Circle Line"

"Alma Mater" is the 11th episode of first season of the British BBC anthology TV series Play for Today. The episode was a television play that was originally broadcast on 7 January 1971. "Alma Mater" was written by David Hodson, directed by James Ferman and produced by Irene Shubik.

In the play civil servant Jimmy Nicholson (Ian Carmichael) returns home after a long period working in the Middle East to visit his son at boarding school, the same school that he himself attended. It is the school's sports day, and old school grudges come flooding back.

The cast included Max Adrian, Hilda Braid, Nigel Hawthorne, Dinah Sheridan, Anthony Andrews and Christopher Reynalds.

No recording of this Play for Today is known to survive.
