= X: The Man with the X-ray Eyes =

1963 science fiction/horror motion picture directed by Roger Corman

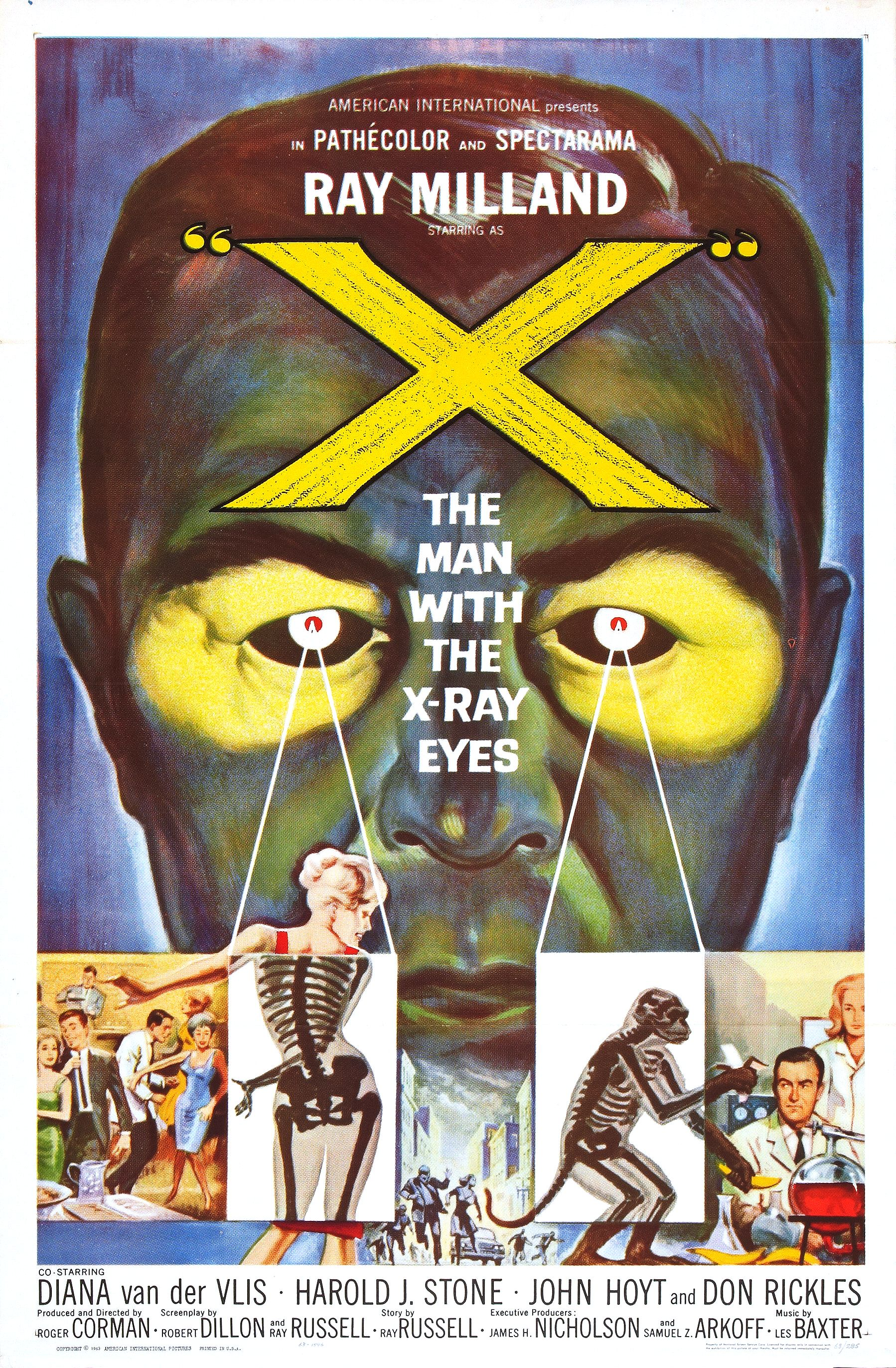
- Theatrical release poster by Reynold Brown
- Directed by: Roger Corman
- Screenplay by: Robert Dillon; Ray Russell
- Story by: Ray Russell
- Produced by: Roger Corman
- Starring: Ray Milland; Diana Van der Vlis; Harold J. Stone; John Hoyt; Don Rickles
- Cinematography: Floyd Crosby
- Edited by: Anthony Carras
- Music by: Les Baxter
- Production company: Alta Vista Productions
- Distributed by: American International Pictures
- Release date: September 18, 1963
- Running time: 79 minutes
- Country: United States
- Language: English
- Budget: ~$280,000
- Box office: 53,087 admissions (France)

X, better known by its promotional title, X: The Man with the X-ray Eyes, is a 1963 American science fiction horror film in Pathécolor, produced and directed by Roger Corman, from a script by Ray Russell and Robert Dillon. The film stars Ray Milland as a scientist who develops a method to extend the range of his vision, which results in unexpected complications. Comedian Don Rickles co-stars in one of his few dramatic roles. Diana Van der Vlis and veteran character actor Morris Ankrum also make appearances.

American International Pictures distributed the film in the fall of 1963 as a double feature with Francis Ford Coppola's horror thriller Dementia 13. The low-budget film was a major financial success.

== Plot ==
Dr. James Xavier develops eye drops intended to increase the range of human vision, allowing one to see beyond the visible spectrum into the ultraviolet and x-ray wavelengths and beyond. Believing that testing on animals and volunteers will produce uselessly subjective data, he tests the drops on himself.

Initially, Xavier discovers that he can see through people's clothing, and he uses his vision to save a young girl whose medical problem was misdiagnosed. Over time and with continued use of the drops, Xavier's visual capacity increases but his ability to control it decreases. Eventually, he can see the world only in forms of light and texture that his brain is unable to fully comprehend. Even closing his eyes brings no relief, as he can see through his closed eyelids.

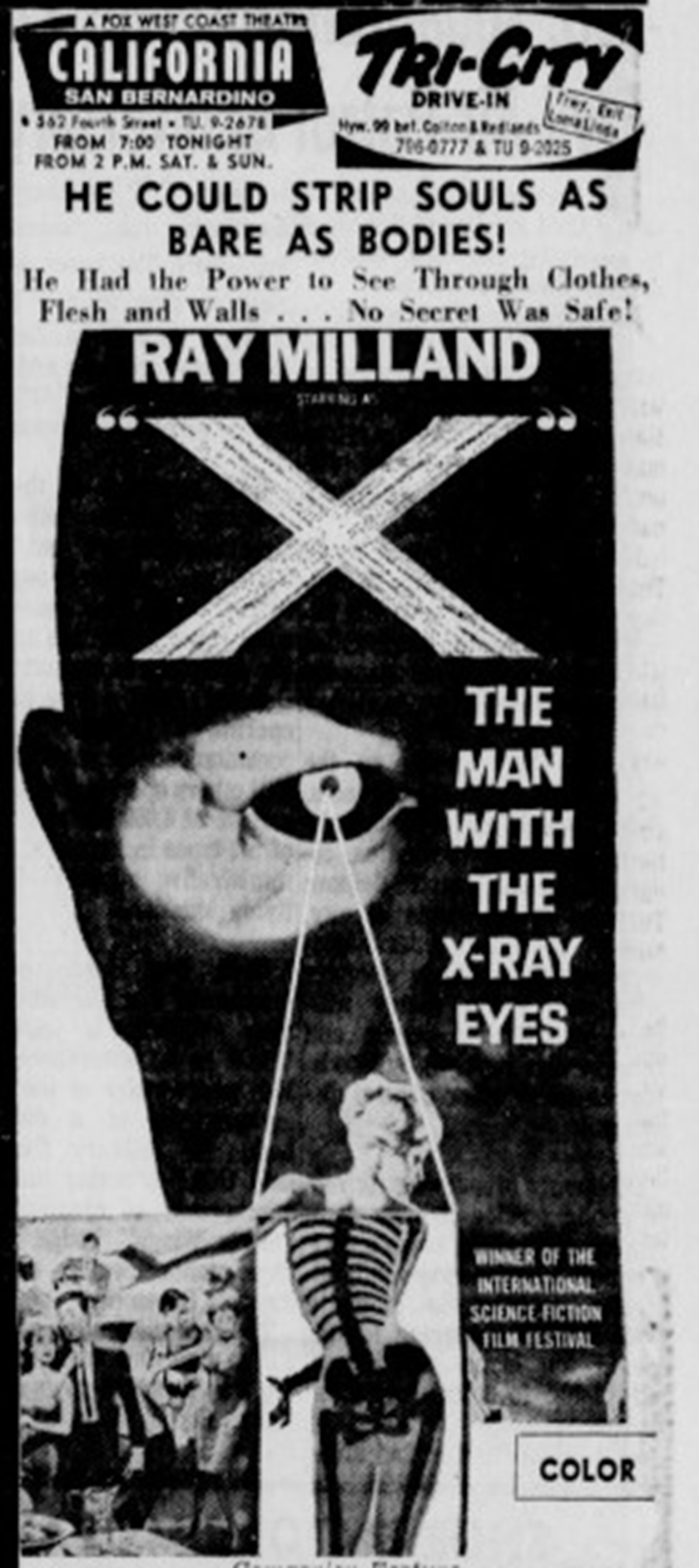
Advertisement from 1963

His friend Dr. Sam Brant advises him to stop the drops until they have had a chance to evaluate the effects, particularly since the eyes have a direct path to the brain. Xavier refuses, and during an argument he accidentally knocks Brant out a window. Xavier's friend Dr. Diane Fairfax persuades him that if he is found he will be convicted of murder, so he goes on the run. He works in a carnival as a mind reader. His manager Crane realises his skill is not a trick, especially when he diagnoses a girl's injuries when she falls from the Ferris wheel, and convinces him that he can make more money as a miracle diagnostician. Xavier's eyes start to change and he has to wear thick protective goggles to prevent overload. People queue up to see him. Fairfax tracks him down and goes into the consultancy. He no longer sees the outer surface so does not recognise her until she speaks. He explains how he can no longer close his eyes to achieve darkness and is haunted by his power. He moves to leave. Having researched Xavier's true identity, Crane threatens to summon the authorities to arrest him for Brant's death if he leaves the consultancy. Fairfax drives Xavier away.

They drive to Las Vegas to use his skill to cheat at a casino. As Brant feared, the drops have begun to affect Xavier's mind; in an irrational fit of anger, he deliberately provokes the casino owners by announcing which cards are in the blackjack dealer's hand and are about to be drawn. The casino calls security. His glasses are knocked off in a scuffle and his eyes are exposed as black and gold. He throws a bundle of cash into the crowd as a diversion, allowing him to escape.

Xavier drives out to the desert alone, but his eyesight is too strange to drive accurately, especially at high speed with a helicopter chasing him. He crashes. He wanders from the crash site and finds a large tent holding a religious revival. The helicopter lands. He tells the evangelist that he is beginning to see things at the edges of the universe, including an "eye that sees us all" in the center of the universe. The pastor replies that what he sees is "sin and the devil" and quotes the Gospel verse, "If thine eye offends thee, pluck it out!" Xavier tears out his eyes.

== Cast ==
Credits adapted from the Second Sight Films Blu-ray booklet.

- Ray Milland as Dr. James Xavier
- Diana Van der Vlis as Dr. Diane Fairfax
- Harold J. Stone as Dr. Sam Brant
- John Hoyt as Dr. Willard Benson
- Don Rickles as Crane

Uncredited:

- Morris Ankrum as Mr. Bowhead
- Lorrie Summers as Party Dancer
- Dick Miller as John Trask
- John Dierkes as Preacher
- Kathryn Hart as Mrs. Mart
- Jonathan Haze as Heckler
- Vicki Lee as Young Patient
- Barboura Morris as Nurse

== Production ==
Corman says the idea for the film was his. It was originally about a scientist, then he felt that was "too obvious" so he changed the protagonist to be "a jazz musician who had taken too much drugs, and I get into about four or five pages [of my outline], and I thought, 'You know, I don’t like this idea,' and so I threw the whole thing out, and started back and went back with the scientist, which was the original idea." The film was shot in three weeks on a budget of approximately $300,000.

The film was announced as part of AIP's release lineup for June 1962, with Lou Rusoff as the producer.

Corman made X: The Man with the X-ray Eyes after his 1963 H. P. Lovecraft film adaptation The Haunted Palace.

In his non-fiction book Danse Macabre, Stephen King claims there were rumors the ending originally went further, with Milland crying out "I can still see!" after gouging out his eyes. Corman has denied the existence of that ending but expressed enjoyment with the idea, saying "Now it's interesting. Stephen King saw the picture and wrote a different ending, and I thought, 'His ending is better than mine.'"

== Reception ==
At the film review aggregator website Rotten Tomatoes, the film holds an approval rating of 88%, based on 25 reviews, with a weighted average rating of 6.6/10. The site's critical consensus reads, "By turns lurid and disturbing, The Man with the X-Ray Eyes is a compelling piece of sci-fi pulp and one of Roger Corman's most effective movies."

=== Awards ===
The film won the Astronave D'argento ("Silver Spaceship") award in 1963 at the first International Festival of Science Fiction Film (Festival internazionale del film di fantascienza) in Trieste, Italy.

== In other media ==
- Gold Key comic book adaptation: X: The Man with the X-ray Eyes (September 1963)
- British band Bauhaus have a song referencing the film in their 1981 album Mask.
- American band Blue Öyster Cult have a song referencing the film in their 1998 album Heaven Forbid.
- Tim Burton developed a script for a remake of the film with writer Bryan Goluboff, but it went unproduced.

== See also ==
- List of cult films
