= The Search for Alexander the Great =

1981 TV mini series

- Poster by Ivan Chermayeff
- Genre: Historical drama
- Screenplay by: George Lefferts; Simon Raven
- Story by: George Lefferts
- Directed by: Peter Sykes
- Starring: James Mason; Nicholas Clay; Jane Lapotaire
- Narrated by: James Mason
- Theme music composer: Robert Sharples
- Countries of origin: United Kingdom; United States
- Original language: English
- No. of episodes: 4

Production
- Executive producers: Michael Peacock; Haidee Granger
- Producer: Michael Latham
- Cinematography: Peter Jessop
- Editor: Peter Pitt
- Production companies: Video Arts Television; Time-Life Television

Original release
- Network: PBS
- Release: 6 May 1981 – May 1981

The Search for Alexander the Great is a 1981 four part TV mini-series directed by Peter Sykes, and narrated by James Mason.

== Plot ==
Alexander the Great's family and friends reminisce at a banquet, looking back over his life, loves and conquests.

== Cast ==
- James Mason as Narrator
- Jane Lapotaire as Olympias
- Robert Stephens as Darius of Persia
- Julian Glover as Philip II
- Nicholas Clay as Alexander
- Ian Charleson as Hephaistion
- Michael Williams as Aristotle
- Michael Byrne as Demosthenes
- Gabriel Byrne as Ptolemy
- Barry Stanton as Cleitus
- Matthew Long as Attalus
- Jack Klaff as Bagoas
- Peter Porteous as Callisthenes
- Justin Sykes as Young Alexander
