= Riddler's Moon =

- Genre: Drama; Science fiction
- Written by: Karl Schiffman
- Directed by: Don McBrearty
- Starring: Corbin Bernsen; Daniel Newman; William Armstrong; Finbar Lynch; Miles Anderson; Kate Mulgrew
- Music by: John Welsman
- Country of origin: United States
- Original language: English

Production
- Executive producers: Lewis B. Chesler; David M. Perlmutter; Stephen Ujlaki
- Producer: Ken Gord
- Cinematography: Jon Joffin
- Editor: Dean Balser
- Running time: 90 minutes
- Production companies: Alliance Atlantis Communications; CLT-UFA; Delux Productions S.A.; Chesler/Perlmutter Productions

Original release
- Network: UPN
- Release: November 5, 1998

Riddler's Moon is a 1998 American science fiction drama television film created for UPN for the Thursday Night at the Movies block as part of the six-film Nightworld anthology. It was the second film in the anthology to air on the block. It was subsequently aired again in 1999, before being acquired by the Fox Family Channel in 2000, where it was frequently aired, until the network was purchased by Disney-ABC Television Group in October 2001.

== Premise ==
Previously barren Indiana farmland owned by a single mother and her disabled son experiences a supernatural bloom.

== Cast ==
- Corbin Bernsen as George Brenner
- Daniel Newman as Elias Riddler
- William Armstrong as Peter Morley
- Finbar Lynch as Kevin Sanders
- Miles Anderson as Ernie
- Kate Mulgrew as Victoria Riddler

== Production ==
Filming took place in Luxembourg in the summer of 1998. The production went through many obstacles, mainly with the script, which had to be rewritten multiple times by multiple screenwriters. Lead actress Kate Mulgrew even had a part in the writing of key pages. By the time filming began, only 10% of the original script was left. The unfortunate circumstances were a result of changes in network executive producers, filming locations, and clashes between executives from Paramount Television, Alliance Atlantis, and RTL Group.

== Home media ==
In the United States, Riddler's Moon was released in several DVD combo packs in 2010 by Echo Bridge Home Entertainment.

== See also ==
- List of television films produced for UPN
