= Rio Vista Dam =

Dam in San Marcos, Texas, US

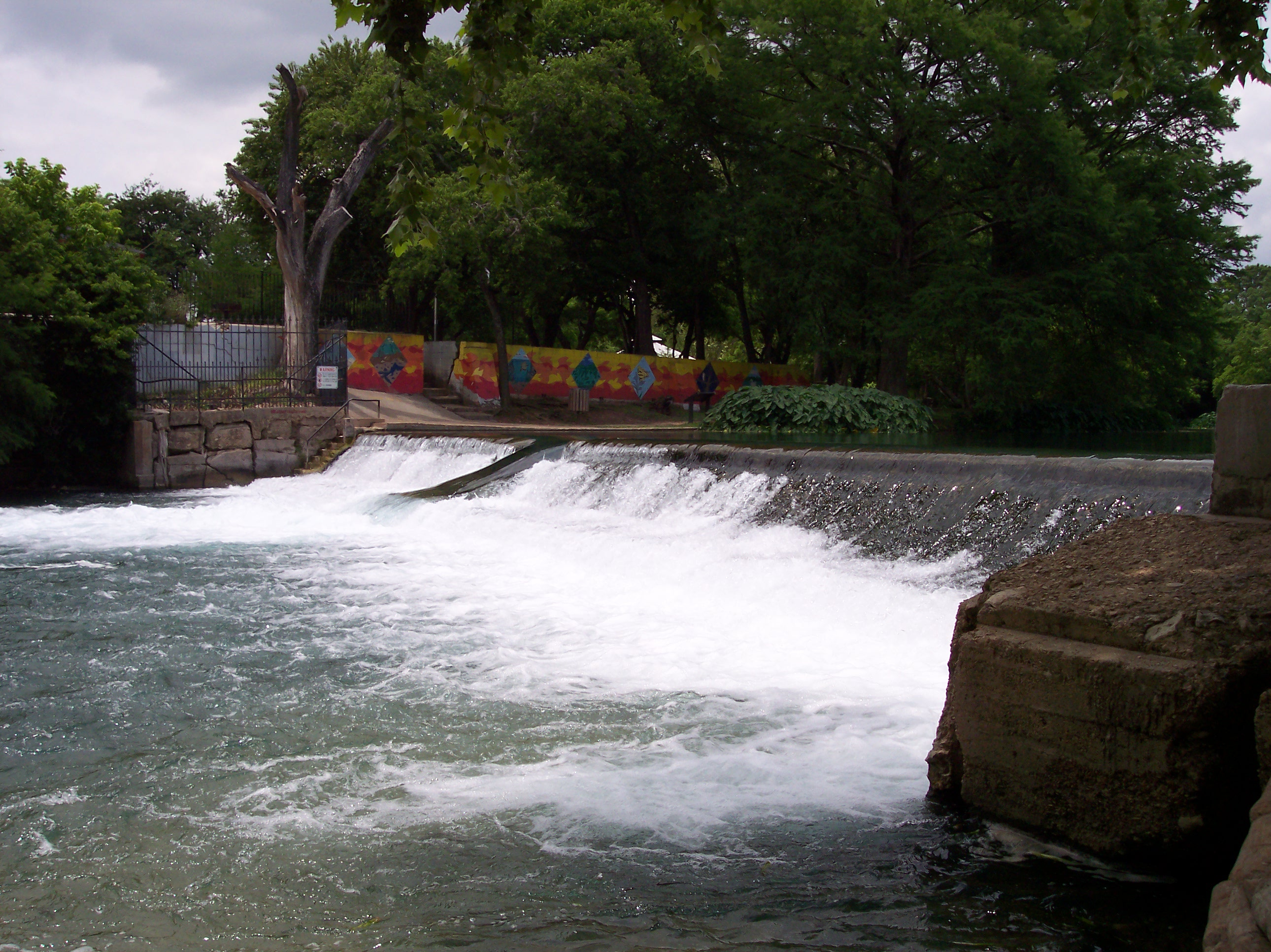
- The "old" Rio Vista Dam, prior to its reconstruction in 2006
- Coordinates: 29°52′43″N 97°55′57″W

Rio Vista Dam is a dam on the San Marcos River in San Marcos, Texas. The flood of 1998 badly damaged the dam.

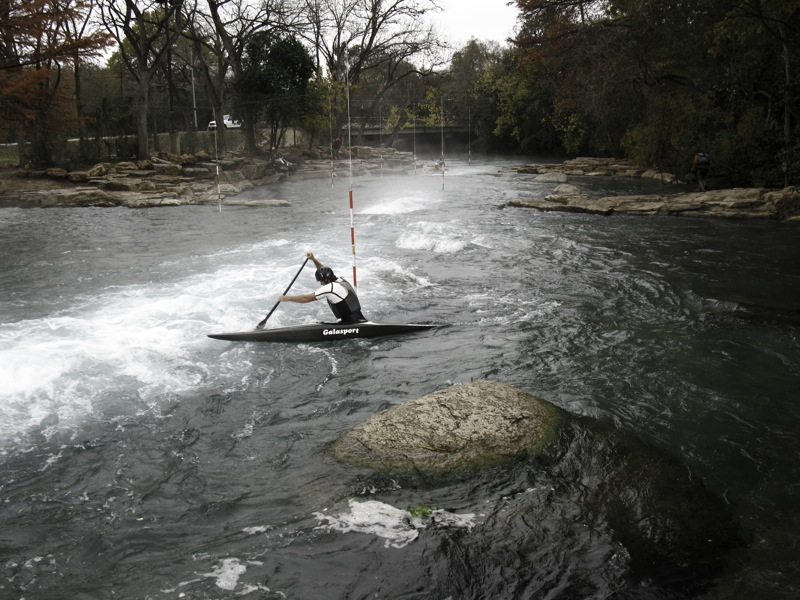
Whitewater slalom in Rio Vista Park

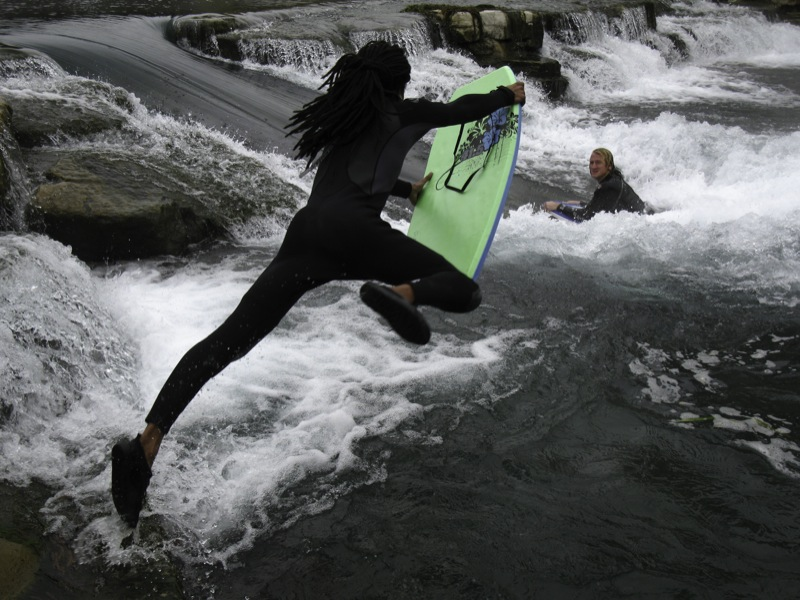
Bodyboarders in Rio Vista Park

Following a US$2.1 million project, Recreation Engineering and Planning (REP) was commissioned to reconstruct the failing dam to enhance existing usage for recreational visitors and tourists alike while improving a stimulant of the local economy. REP was capable of providing a design which was tailored to the needs of the Rio Vista Dam which drastically reduced the reconstruction costs from $1.8 million to $500,000. The reconstruction efforts done by KBR, included removing the failing concrete side walls, grading the banks down to the water, and the addition of artificial rapids. REP completed the project in just under four months when the park reopened on May 25, 2006.

== Rio Vista Park ==
The Rio Vista Park is a 13-acre (5.3 ha) park located on the dam, which serves as a local hotspot for swimming, tubing, canoeing, and kayaking.
