= Tea at Five =

Play written by Matthew Lombardo

Tea at Five is a 2002 one-woman play written by Matthew Lombardo, which presents the story of Katharine Hepburn through a monologue. It is based on Hepburn's book, Me: Stories of My Life. The initial production starred Kate Mulgrew, for whom the part was reportedly written.

Mulgrew has frequently been compared to Hepburn—a comparison she has described in interviews as "odious." Although she was not initially a fan of Hepburn, Mulgrew reportedly developed a deep appreciation for her while researching the role.

== Plot ==
Tea at Five offers an intimate look at Katharine Hepburn in her home at the Fenwick estate in Old Saybrook, Connecticut.

The first act takes place in September 1938. Despite her Broadway appearances and her first Oscar, Hepburn has just been labeled "box office poison" after a series of film flops. With her professional future in doubt, she reflects on her childhood in Hartford, her education, and her start in show business.

The second act takes place in February 1983, after Hepburn is injured in a car crash. The accident gives the now-legendary star an opportunity to reflect on the triumphs of her career and her heartbreaking romance with Spencer Tracy.

== Origin and productions ==
Aspiring playwright Matthew Lombardo was watching the television program Star Trek: Voyager with his friend Nancy Addison. Addison, an actress who had appeared on Ryan's Hope, was a cast member on the soap opera where Lombardo was then a staff writer.

As they watched Kate Mulgrew in the lead role of Captain Kathryn Janeway, Lombardo remarked, "I said, 'My God, she looks like Katharine Hepburn! Someone should write a play for her!' Nancy responded, 'You’re a playwright, you idiot. Write it, and I’ll get it to her.' So I did."

Kate Mulgrew originated the role of Katharine Hepburn at Hartford Stage in 2002 and continued with the show through various productions, including at Cleveland Play House, American Repertory Theatre (Cambridge, MA), Promenade Theatre (New York), Cuillo Center for the Arts (West Palm Beach, FL), Orpheum Theatre (Phoenix, AZ), The Bushnell Belding Theatre (Hartford, CT), The Shubert Theatre (Boston), Hippodrome Theatre (Baltimore), Seattle Repertory Theatre, Marines’ Memorial Theatre (San Francisco), and Pasadena Playhouse.

An audiobook production of Tea at Five was released on CD in September 2004. The script is published by Samuel French.

A tour starring four-time Tony Award nominee Tovah Feldshuh opened at the Northshore Center for the Performing Arts in Skokie, IL, and then ran at the Parker Playhouse in Fort Lauderdale, FL, from January 9 through 13, 2008.

A professionally licensed production of Tea at Five took place at the Stratford-upon-Avon Fringe Festival (UK) from June 2–9, 2012, starring Meg Lloyd as Katharine Hepburn. Directed by Christopher Wraysford and produced by Indefatigable Productions, the production won awards for Best Solo Production and Best Female Actor, and was also nominated for Best Director. The same production later moved to The Old Joint Stock Theatre in Birmingham (UK) for performances on September 14 and 15, 2012.

This production was also performed at the Edinburgh Fringe Festival in August 2013, co-directed by Richard Bunn and Rebecca Phillips, and starring Meg Lloyd.

Other actors who have starred in Tea at Five include Stephanie Zimbalist and Charles Busch.

It was announced in December 2018 that Faye Dunaway would headline a 2019 Broadway production of Tea at Five, marking her return to Broadway some thirty-seven years after her sole Broadway lead role in the 1982 flop The Curse of an Aching Heart, which was also Dunaway's first New York stage engagement in sixteen years. Lombardo reworked the play into a 70-minute single act, focused on Katharine Hepburn at age 75. Directed by John Tillinger, the production played at the Huntington Avenue Theatre in Boston from June 22 to July 14, 2019, with Dunaway in the lead.

Following this purported Broadway tryout engagement, there were reports that the play's producers had fired Dunaway for unprofessional backstage behavior. However, Tea at Five's Boston engagement had not been a major audience draw and received mixed reviews, which likely would not have encouraged a Broadway transfer. The producers issued a statement saying, "Plans are in development for the play to have its West End debut early next year with a new actress to play the role of Katharine Hepburn," but this debut never materialized.
