= Poinsettia Heights =

Coordinates: 26.1472756°N 80.1233175°W

- Interactive map of Poinsettia Heights
- Country: United States
- State: Florida
- City: Fort Lauderdale

Poinsettia Heights is a neighborhood in the northeast section of Fort Lauderdale, Florida, and its boundaries are west of Federal Highway (US 1), north of Sunrise Boulevard and adjacent to the neighborhoods of Lake Ridge and Middle River Terrace. The original development, called "North Ridge," was built by Gill Construction Company right after World War II in the 1940s and early 1950s.

Today homes line the streets from 15th Avenue on the west to 20th Avenue and Lake Melva on the east. The Middle River forms a natural boundary to the north and 13th Street separates it from the neighboring Lake Ridge.

Poinsettia Heights is zoned single family residents and allows townhomes and condos only along the two main thoroughfares. Two schools are located in within the neighborhood (Sunrise Middle School and Bennett Elementary School.) Shopping can be done along U.S. 1 and its eastside location. Homes generally range from 1,100 to 1,800 square feet (170 m^{2}) but with new construction can be in excess of 4,000 square feet (370 m^{2}).
