= Nicholas Clay =

English actor (1946–2000)

- Clay as Sir Lancelot in Excalibur (1981)
- Born: Nicholas Anthony Phillip Clay; 18 September 1946; Streatham, London, England
- Died: 25 May 2000 (aged 53); London, England
- Resting place: Saint Peter's Churchyard, Sibton, Suffolk, England
- Years active: 1961–2000
- Spouse: Lorna Heilbron (m. 1980)
- Children: 2

Nicholas Anthony Phillip Clay (18 September 1946 – 25 May 2000) was an English actor.

== Early life ==
Clay was born in Streatham, London on 18 September 1946, the son of a professional soldier in the British Army's Royal Engineers. The family settled in Kent, where Clay became interested in acting, performing at the Medway Little Theatre Club.

== Career ==
He had roles on TV in episodes of Ask Mr. Pastry (1961), ITV Television Playhouse, The Pocket Lancer (1961), and Tales of Mystery. He made his film debut with These Are the Damned (1962) and could be seen in Dixon of Dock Green, William, Sergeant Cork, and Drama 61-67. He studied at the Royal Academy of Dramatic Art (RADA).

Clay appeared in several West End theatre productions.

He returned to films with The Night Digger (1971), a horror film with Patricia Neal and was in episodes of Take Three Girls, Armchair Theatre, and Love Story.

Clay had the starring role of Charles Darwin in The Darwin Adventure (1972) and was in William: The Life, Works and Times of William Shakespeare (1972). He was cast in several of Laurence Olivier's Old Vic productions and during the 1970s came to be regarded as one of British theatre's most promising actors. At the National Theatre he played Aumerle in Richard II, Giovanni in Tis Pity She's a Whore (directed by Roland Joffe), Nugget in Equus, a Jumper in Jumpers (directed by Peter Wood), Rocca in Saturday Sunday Monday (directed by Franco Zeffirelli), Young Seward in Macbeth (directed by Michael Blakemore) and Acaste in The Misanthrope. Blakemore also directed him in the part of Young Inna in Arturo Ui at Nottingham Playhouse, where Clay acted several roles in Jonathan Miller's production of King Lear. He played Hastings in Clifford Williams's world tour of She Stoops to Conquer. The Misanthrope led Clay to the United States, where he also played this role on Broadway in 1975. On the West End stage, Clay was Maurice in Flint (Criterion Theatre) and Trigorin in The Seagull (Cambridge Theatre).

He appeared in In This House of Brede (1975) with Diana Rigg and played Alan in the 1976 version of The Picture of Dorian Gray, alongside Peter Firth. Clay was in Terror of Frankenstein (1977) then did Saturday Sunday Monday (1978) with Laurence Olivier.

In 1978 he played Henry Wriothesley, 3rd Earl of Southampton in the drama series Will Shakespeare, about the life of Shakespeare.

Clay had a small role in Zulu Dawn (1979) and was in Lovespell, filmed in 1979 but not released until 1981. He played Orestes in The Greeks: A Journey in Space and Time (1980).

In 1981 he gave his most widely seen screen performance, as Lancelot in the 1981 film Excalibur. He followed it playing the title role in The Search for Alexander the Great (1981). He appeared in Just Jaeckin's film version of D.H. Lawrence's Lady Chatterley's Lover (1981), playing Mellors, and in Agatha Christie's Evil Under the Sun (1982), the latter reuniting him with Diana Rigg, his co-star in The Misanthrope. Director of Evil Guy Hamilton said "I was looking for someone like Stewart Granger or Michael Rennie - handsome, dashing, physical, romantic. Nick has it all. A fine sense of timing, the right looks and a good physique."

For TV Clay was in The Agatha Christie Hour (1982), in an adaptation of "In a Glass Darkly" then Russian Night... 1941 (1983), The Hound of the Baskervilles (1983) and The Last Days of Pompeii (1984).

Clay continued working regularly on stage and appeared in a number of made-for-television films and miniseries. In 1984 he played Mike Preston in the Hammer House of Mystery and Suspense episode "Child's Play". He did Das Martyrium des heiligen Sebastian (1984) in Germany and The Corsican Brothers (1985) for TV. Clay was Doctor Percy Trevelyan in an episode of The Adventures of Sherlock Holmes entitled "The Resident Patient".

Clay had support parts in Sleeping Beauty (1987), Lionheart (1987) and Poor Little Rich Girl: The Barbara Hutton Story (1987). He also appeared in the UK ITV series Gentlemen and Players in 1988-89.

In 1992 he appeared with Kim Thomson in the BBC TV series Virtual Murder.

Later appearances included The New Adventures of Robin Hood, Zorro, Kavanagh QC, Shine on Harvey Moon, The Odyssey, Shanghai 1937, Bugs, Highlander, Psychos and playing Lord Leo in the 1998 TV miniseries Merlin starring Sam Neill. His final screen appearance was in Roger Ashton-Griffiths' short film And Beyond. Later theatre work included Design for Living (1995).

In the latter years Clay taught drama at The Actors' Centre and the Academy of Live and Performing Arts, and also worked in association with the Royal Academy of Dramatic Art, generally in the role of promoting the organisation, or providing advice to acting students.

== Death ==
Clay died in London on 25 May 2000, at age 53 from liver cancer.

== Personal life ==
In 1980, Clay married actress Lorna Heilbron; they had two daughters.

== Filmography ==
=== Film ===
Year	Title	Role	Notes	References
1963	The Damned	Richard		
1971	The Night Digger aka The Road Builder	Billy Jarvis		
1972	The Darwin Adventure	Charles Darwin		
1977	Terror of Frankenstein	Henry Clerval		
1979	Zulu Dawn	Lt. Raw		
1981	Excalibur	Lancelot		
1981	Lady Chatterley's Lover	Oliver Mellors		
1981	Lovespell	Tristan		
1982	Evil Under the Sun	Patrick Redfern		
1987	Sleeping Beauty	The Prince		
1987	Lionheart	Charles De Montfort		

=== Television ===
Year	Title	Role	Notes	References
1975	In This House of Brede	David	TV movie	
1978	Will Shakespeare	Earl of Southampton	Television miniseries	
1981	The Search for Alexander the Great	Alexander the Great	TV miniseries	
1983	The Hound of the Baskervilles	Jack Stapleton	TV movie	
1984	The Last Days of Pompeii	Glaucus	TV miniseries	
1985	The Adventures of Sherlock Holmes	Percy Trevelyan	Episode: "The Resident Patient"	
1987	Poor Little Rich Girl: The Barbara Hutton Story	Prince Alexis Mdivani	TV movie	
1988	Gentlemen and Players	Mike Savage		
1991	Zorro	Viscount Armand de Jussac	2 episodes	
1992	Virtual Murder	Dr. John Cornelius		
1995	Shine on Harvey Moon	Squadron Leader Cunningham	4 episodes	
1995	Kavanagh QC	Mr Justice Fulbright	Episode "Blood Money"	
1997	The Odyssey	Menelaus	TV miniseries	
1997	The New Adventures of Robin Hood	Sheriff of Nottingham	2 episodes	
1997	Highlander	Loxley	Episode: "Unusual Suspects"	
1998	Merlin	Lord Leo	TV miniseries	
1999	Psychos	Dr. Angus Harvey	6 episodes	
