= Palm Aire =

Palm Aire, Florida
- neighborhood
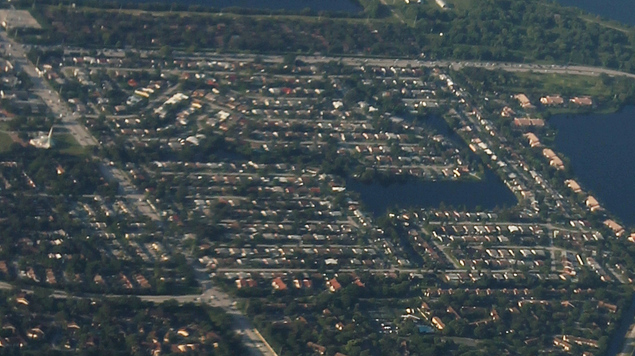
- Aerial view of Palm Aire
- Interactive map of Palm Aire, Florida
- Coordinates: 26°12′22″N 80°11′30″W
- Country: United States
- State: Florida
- County: Broward

Area
  - Total: 0.23 sq mi (0.6 km^{2})
  - Land: 0.23 sq mi (0.6 km^{2})
  - Water: 0 sq mi (0.0 km^{2})
- Elevation: 10 ft (3.0 m)

Population (2000)
  - Total: 1,539
  - Density: 6,894/sq mi (2,661.7/km^{2})
- Time zone: UTC-5 (Eastern (EST))
  - Summer (DST): UTC-4 (EDT)
- FIPS code: 12-53935
- GNIS feature ID: 1853272

Palm Aire, Florida was an unincorporated census-designated place in Broward County, Florida consisting of residential property, commercial businesses, and four golf courses. Palm Aire describes both Palm Aire Village, a collection of single-family houses, and Palm Aire Country Club, a 5,000-acre (20 km^{2}) property with condominiums, villas, estate homes, and four golf courses. It is now part of the cities of Fort Lauderdale and Pompano Beach.

== Data ==
As of the 2005 census, the CDP population was 5,784 in Fort Lauderdale and a population of 12,137 in Pompano Beach. The city of Fort Lauderdale incorporates the subdivision known as Palm Aire Village West, as well as a portion of the subdivision known as Palm Aire Village East.

The subdivision was unincorporated until the residents voted to incorporate into the city of Fort Lauderdale in September, 1999. Although the 2000 census reported it as a separate area, by September, 2000, it was fully legally incorporated into Fort Lauderdale.

The area commonly known as Palm Aire is actually a considerable portion of southwest Pompano Beach, comprising numerous condominium developments, golf courses, rental units and valuable homes. Palm Aire Country Club is home to several smaller sub-communities: Misty Oaks, Vizcaya, Fairview Pointe, Cypress Reach, Oasis, Palm Aire Gardens, & Royal Point.

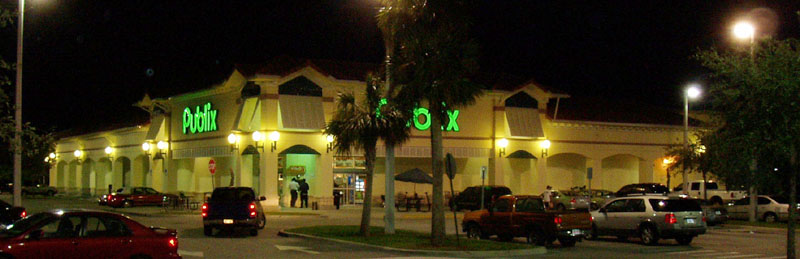
The "Publix" of Palm Aire Country Club

== Geography ==
According to the United States Census Bureau, the CDP has a total area of 0.6 km^{2} (0.23 sq mi), all land.

== Demographics ==
As of the census of 2000, there were 1,539 people, 533 households, and 422 families residing in the CDP. The population density was 2,701.0 people/km^{2} (6,996 people/mi^{2}). There were 544 housing units at an average density of 954.7 units/km^{2} (2,473 units/mi^{2}). The racial makeup of the CDP was 83.82% White (71.7% were Non-Hispanic White,) 9.29% African American, 0.39% Native American, 1.75% Asian, 0.19% Pacific Islander, 2.08% from other races, and 2.47% from two or more races. Hispanic or Latino of any race were 14.81% of the population.

There were 533 households, out of which 36.2% had children under the age of 18 living with them, 63.8% were married couples living together, 9.6% had a female householder with no husband present, and 20.8% were non-families. 13.3% of all households were made up of individuals, and 5.1% had someone living alone who was 65 years of age or older. The average household size was 2.89 and the average family size was 3.18.

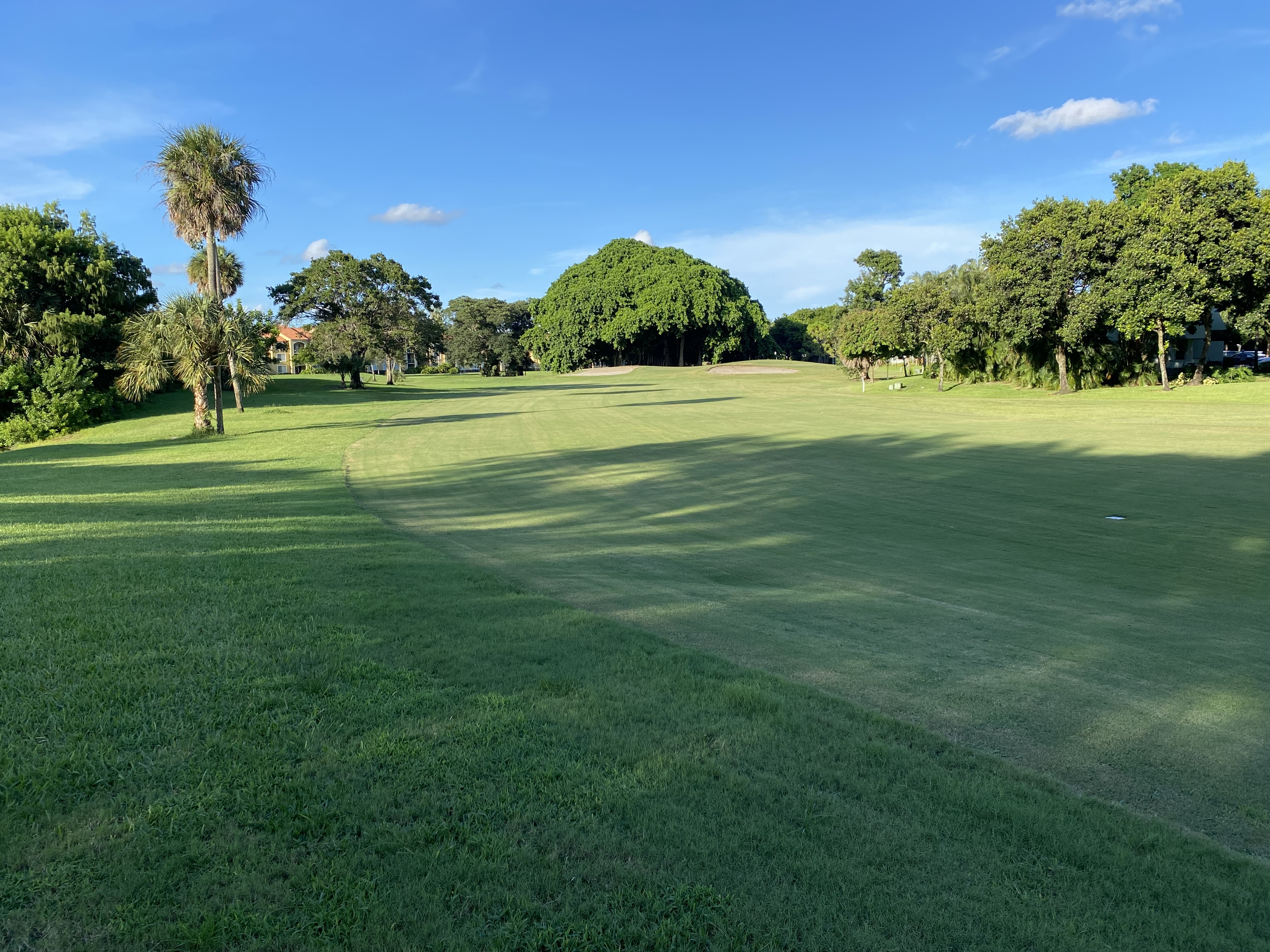
Cypress course at Palm Aire Country Club

In the CDP, the population was spread out, with 25.9% under the age of 18, 6.4% from 18 to 24, 34.0% from 25 to 44, 23.9% from 45 to 64, and 9.7% who were 65 years of age or older. The median age was 37 years. For every 100 females, there were 104.1 males. For every 100 females age 18 and over, there were 100.4 males.

The median income for a household in the CDP was $57,097, and the median income for a family was $62,031. Males had a median income of $50,304 versus $28,810 for females. The per capita income for the CDP was $24,557. About 4.7% of families and 7.9% of the population were below the poverty line, including 13.2% of those under age 18 and 4.7% of those age 65 or over.

As of 2000, English as a first language accounted for 85.71% of all residents and Spanish as a first language for 14.28% of the population.

== Notable residents ==
- Harry Newman (1909–2000), All-Pro football quarterback
