= Marilyn Bendell =

American painter

- Born: September 21, 1921; Grand Ledge, Michigan
- Died: May 18, 2003 (aged 81)
- Education: American Academy of Art
- Movement: Chicago Galleries Association

Mountain Stream, oil on canvas painting by Marilyn Bendell, private collection

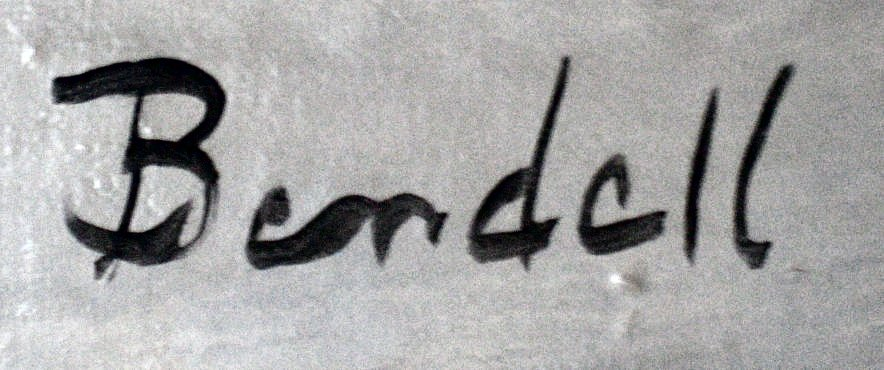
Typical signature of Marilyn Bendell

Marilyn Bendell (September 19, 1921 – May 18, 2003) was an American impressionist painter.

== Life ==
She was born in Grand Ledge, Michigan. She was training to become a concert pianist, but at age 17, decided to pursue painting instead. She studied painting at the American Academy of Art in Chicago and privately with Arnold E. Turtle (1892–1954). She became an artist member of the Chicago Galleries Association, and was elected a Fellow of the Royal Society for the Encouragement of the Arts in 1965.

About 1960, she moved to Longboat Key, Florida, where she ran an art school on Cortez Road with her husband George Burrows. She painted figural compositions, still lifes, and abstract compositions.

Her final move was to Nambé Pueblo, New Mexico (20 miles from Santa Fe) in 1983, where she continued to give private instruction until 1993. Thereafter, she pursued painting exclusively, until her death on May 18, 2003, at age 81. Her New Mexico oeuvre consists primarily of impressionistic paintings of Native Americans and other women. Her paintings are generally signed "Bendell" without a date.

Her son and student, David Hyams, is also a painter of the Santa Fe School.
