= Rio Vista (Fort Lauderdale) =

Neighborhood in Fort Lauderdale, Florida, US

Coordinates: 26.1112111°N 80.1302969°W

The Rio Vista neighborhood is a community of over 1,000 homes, situated next to downtown Fort Lauderdale, Florida. Its name means "River View" in Spanish. It is one of the oldest communities in Fort Lauderdale and features tree-lined streets, sidewalks and unique architecture.

At the close of World War I, Ft. Lauderdale had approximately 2,000 residents. An era of prosperity and new transportation in the 1920s allowed Fort Lauderdale to begin the migration from an agricultural community to a resort town. Residential areas, such as Rio Vista and Colee Hammock, began to develop. The first plat of the area was recorded by Mary Brickell (wife of William Brickell) of Miami and major landholder. Upon her death, the land was purchased by C.J. Hector, who began his "River View" development. By February 1923, the Ft. Lauderdale Herald (now the Sun Sentinel) reported that Rio Vista was booming, with over 5,000 feet of sidewalk laid and streetlights were installed.

The land boom reached its zenith by 1925, when Ft. Lauderdale's population reached 16,000. On September 18, 1926, the coast of South Florida was devastated by the 1926 Miami Hurricane which put the area into a depression, three years before the rest of the country entered its economic depression. With the onset of World War II, thousands of servicemen discovered this area and settled here after the war. Rio Vista development began again, and today, the area reflects the history.

The community is bounded by Federal Highway (U.S. 1) on the west, bordered on the east by the Intracoastal Waterway, south of the New River and north of SE 12th Street (north of the neighborhoods of Harbordale and Lauderdale Harbours.)
