= North Woodlawn Cemetery =

Historic cemetery in Fort Lauderdale, Broward County, Florida, US

- U.S. National Register of Historic Places
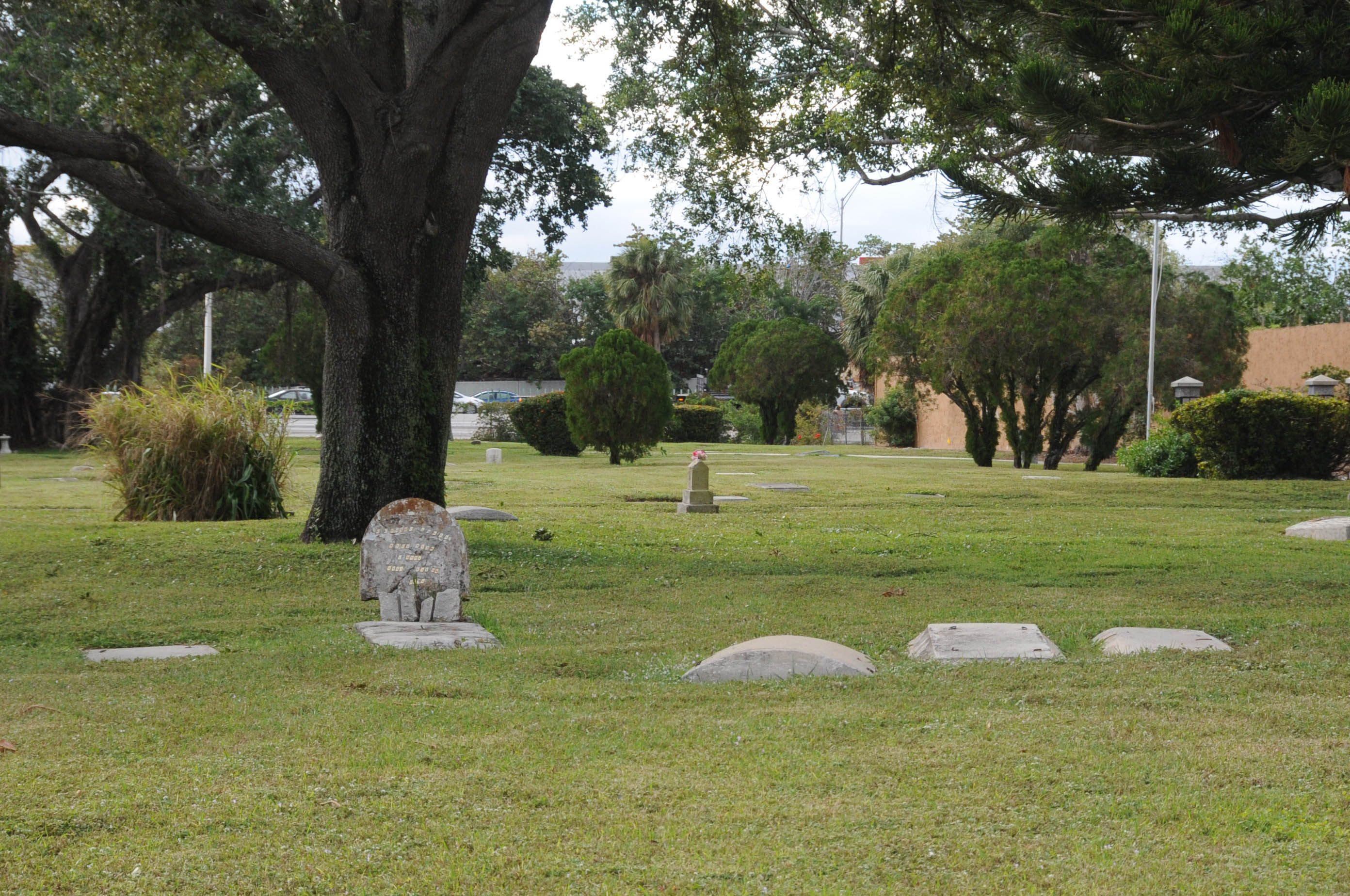
- Cemetery in 2018
- Location: 1936 NW 9th St, Fort Lauderdale, FL 33311
- Coordinates: 26°02′18″N 80°08′50″W
- NRHP reference No.: 100001861
- Added to NRHP: 29 November 2017

North Woodlawn Cemetery, an African-American cemetery located east of Interstate 95 near Sunrise Boulevard in Fort Lauderdale, Florida. Not used for new burials, it was added to the National Register of Historic Places on 29 November 2017. Founded in the 1920s, lynch victim Reuben Stacey was buried there in 1935. An area that may have been unmarked graves was built over in the construction of Interstate 95 in the 1970s. Another section of unmarked graves of infants may have been paved over in 1995. Maintained by the City of Fort Lauderdale, it was restored in 2002.
