= Fort Lauderdale, Florida =

- City
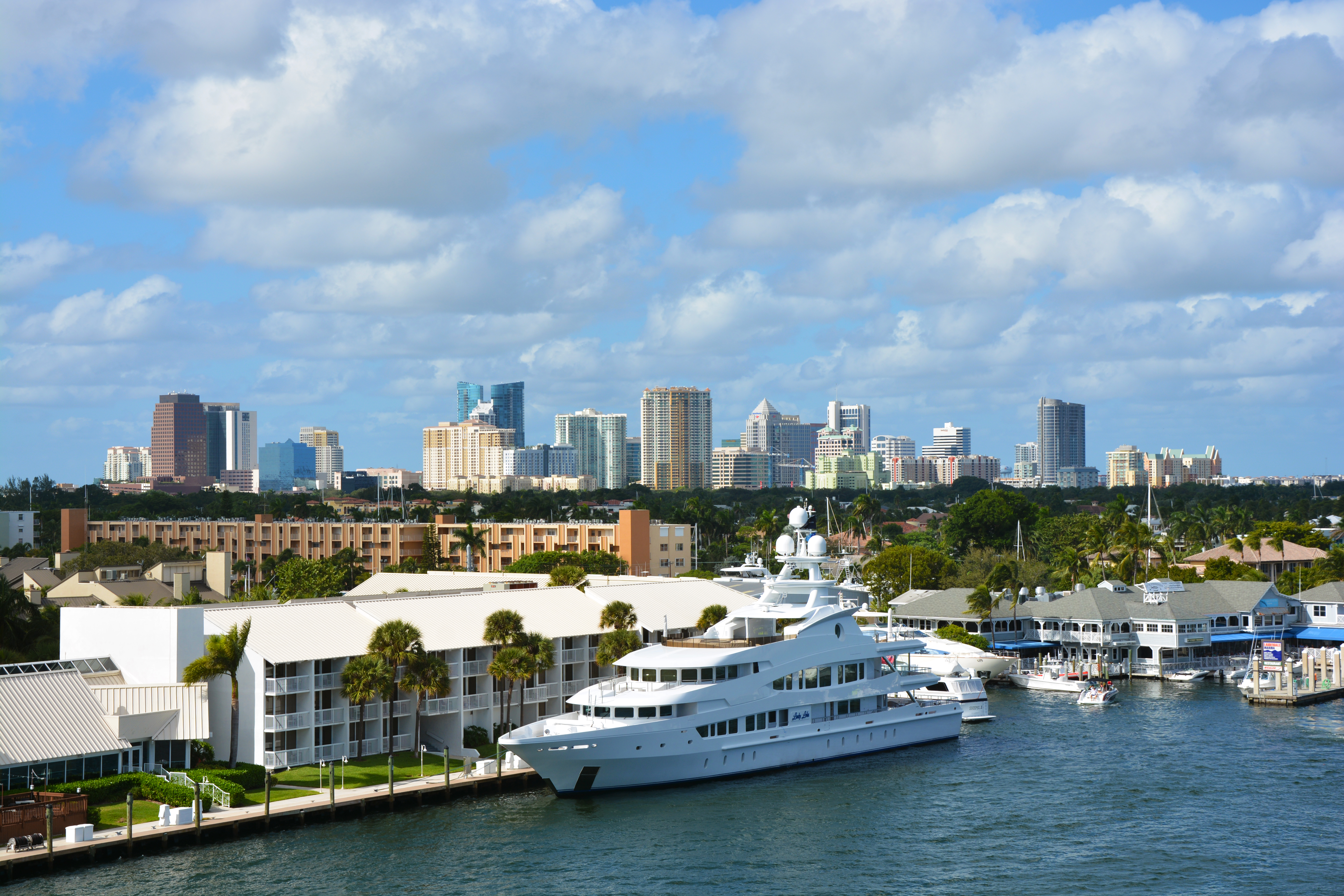
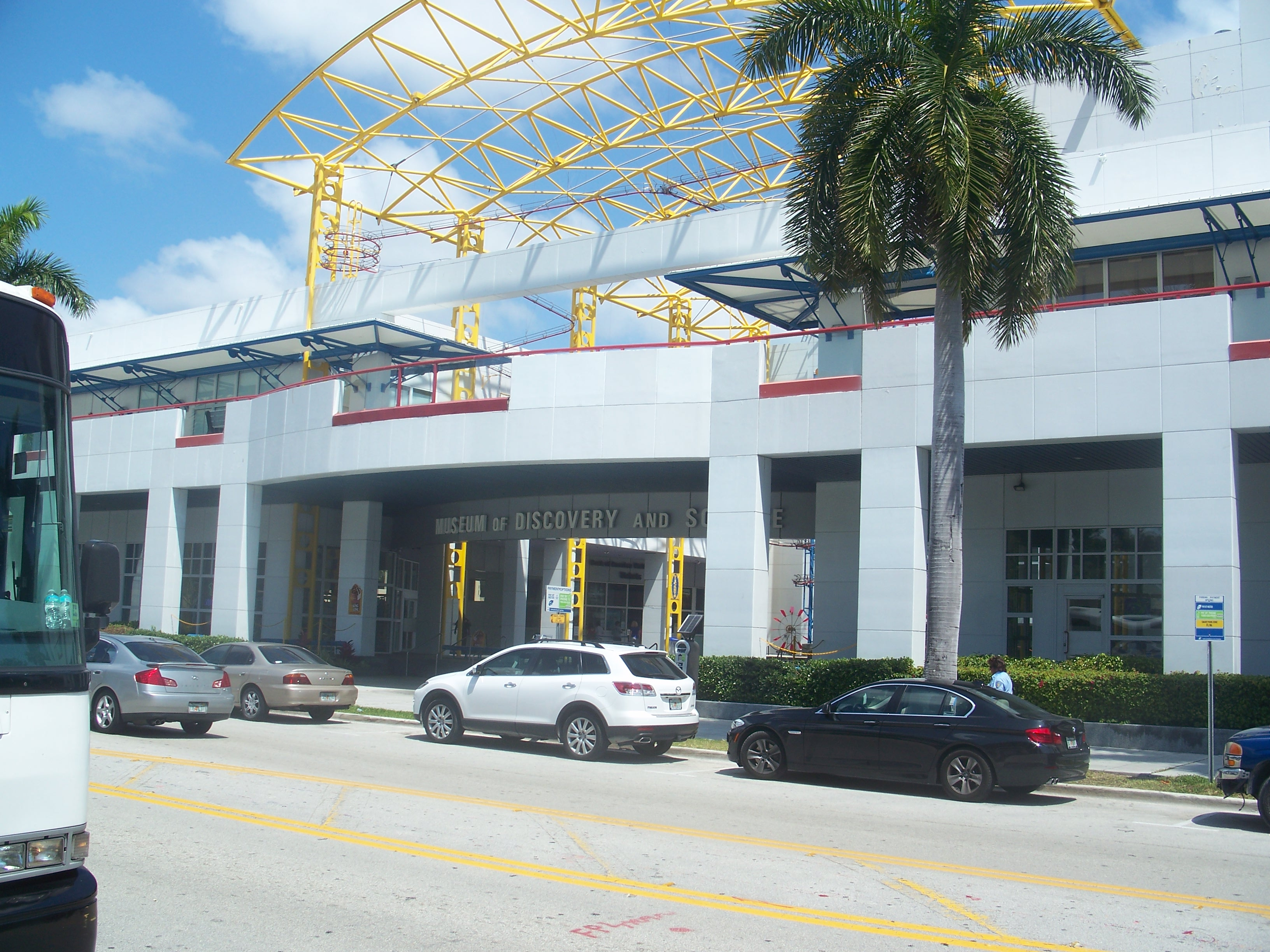
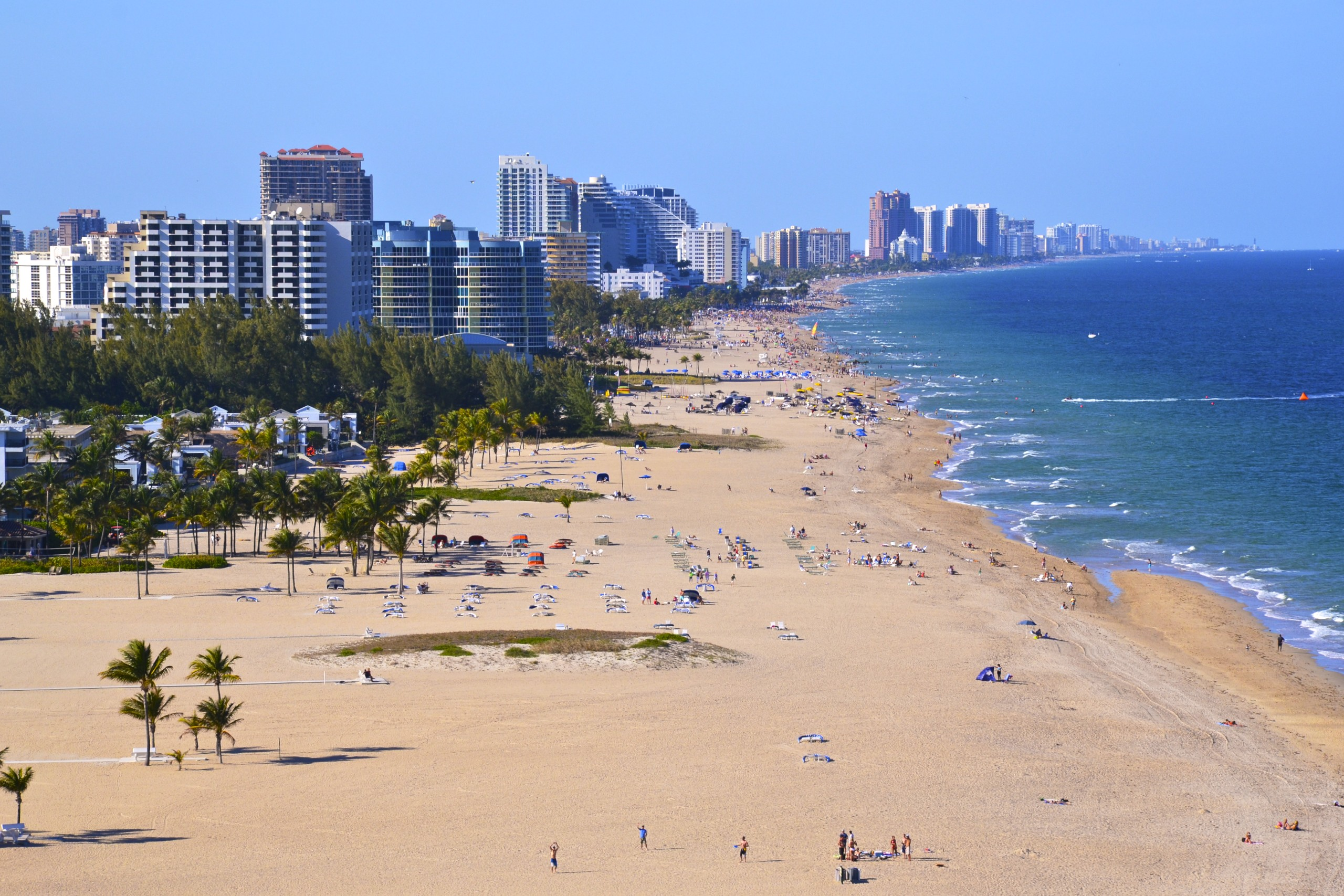
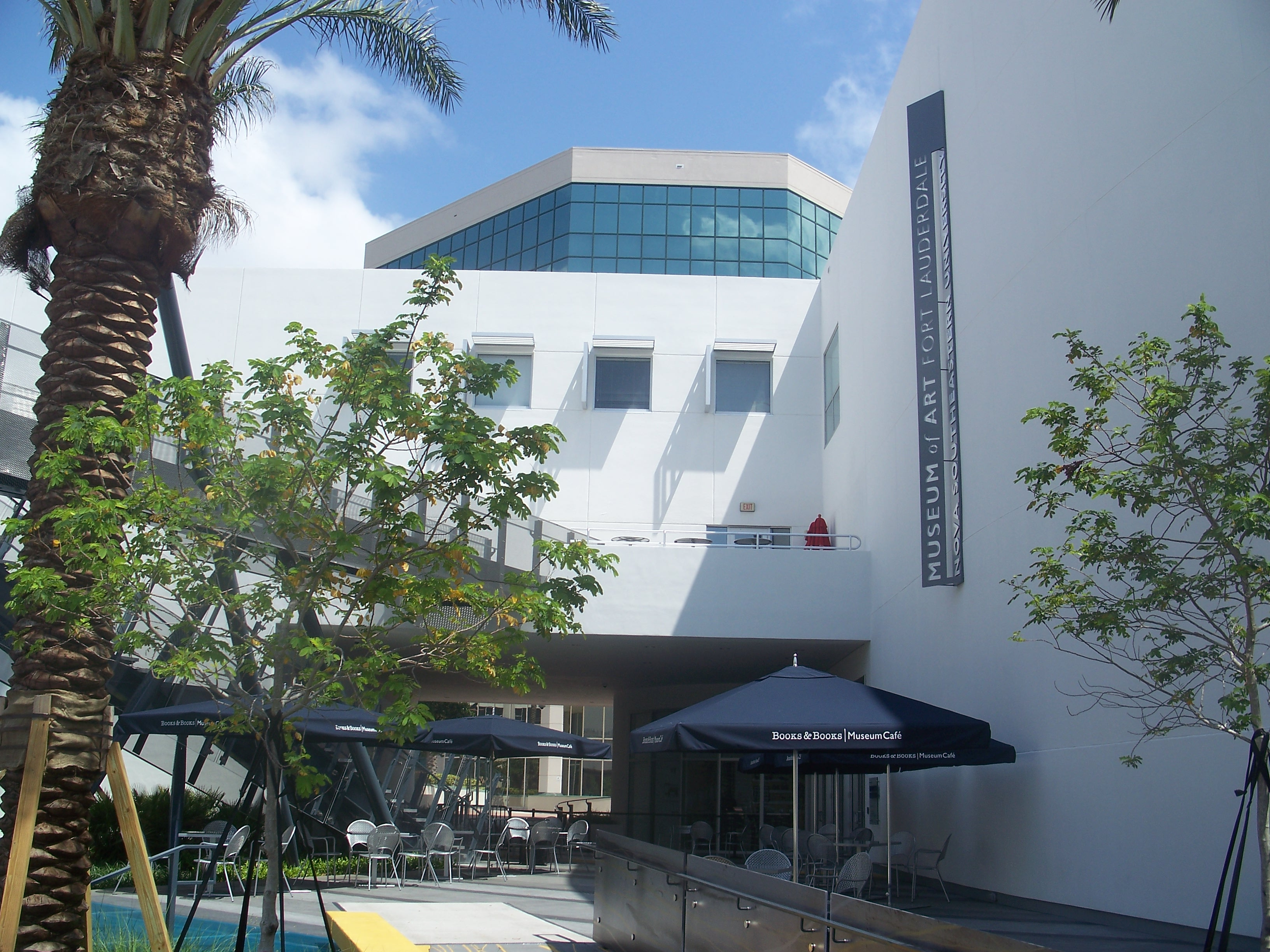
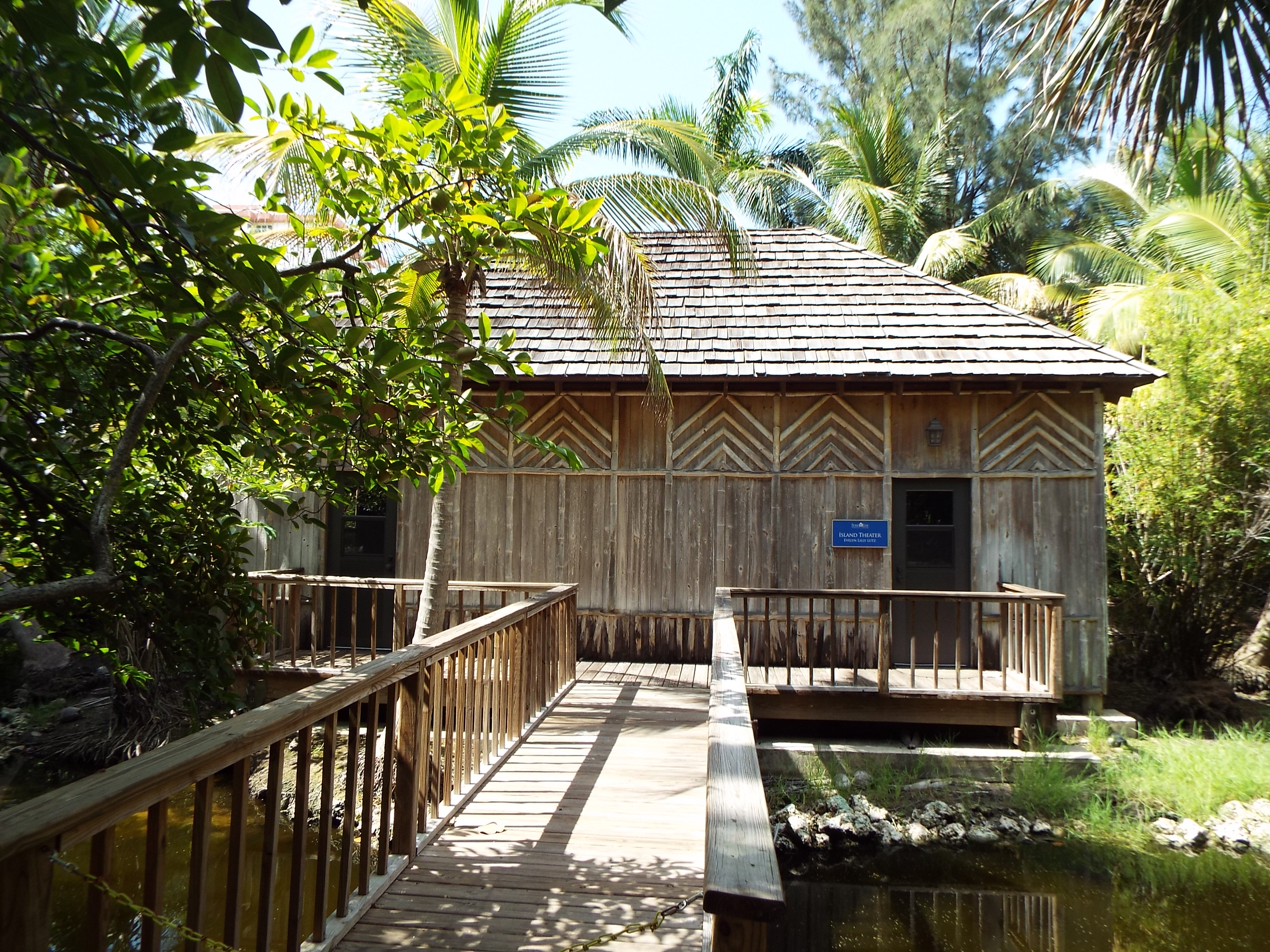
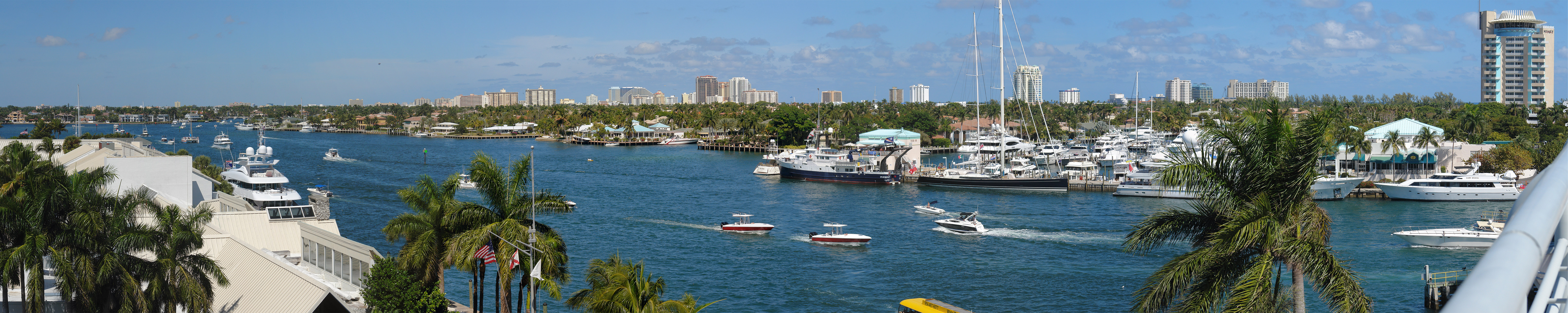
- City skyline Museum of Discovery and Science Beach along FL A1A Museum of Art Island Theater at Bonnet House Intracoastal Waterway

- Flag Seal
- Nickname: Venice of America
- Interactive map of Fort Lauderdale, Florida
- Location within Florida Location within the United States
- Coordinates: 26°08′28″N 80°08′40″W
- Country: United States
- State: Florida
- County: Broward
- Established: March 27, 1911
- Named for: William Lauderdale

Government
  - Type: Commission-Manager
  - Mayor: Dean Trantalis (D)
  - Commissioners: John Herbst (District 1); Steven Glassman (District 2); Pamela Beasley-Pittman (District 3); Ben Sorensen (District 4)
  - City Manager: Rickelle Williams

Area
  - Total: 36.30 sq mi (94.01 km^{2})
  - Land: 34.59 sq mi (89.58 km^{2})
  - Water: 1.71 sq mi (4.44 km^{2}) 4.71%
- Elevation: 7 ft (2.1 m)

Population (2020)
  - Total: 182,760
  - Estimate (2024): 190,641
  - Rank: 136th in the United States; 10th in Florida
  - Density: 5,284.1/sq mi (2,040.21/km^{2})
- Demonym: Fort Lauderdalians
- Time zone: UTC−5 (Eastern (EST))
  - Summer (DST): UTC−4 (EDT)
- ZIP Codes: 33301–33332, 33334–33340, 33345–33346, 33348–33349, 33351, 33355, 33359, 33388, 33394
- Area codes: 754, 954
- FIPS code: 12-24000
- GNIS feature ID: 2403640
- Primary Airport: Fort Lauderdale–Hollywood International Airport
- Website: fortlauderdale.gov

Fort Lauderdale (/ˈlɔː.dər.deɪl/) is a coastal city located in the U.S. state of Florida, 30 miles (48 km) north of Miami along the Atlantic Ocean. It is the seat of government of and most populous city in Broward County with a population of 182,760 at the 2020 census, making it the tenth-most populous city in Florida. After Miami and Hialeah, Fort Lauderdale is the third-most populous city in the Miami metro area, which had a population of 6,166,488 in 2019.

Built in 1838 and first incorporated in 1911, Fort Lauderdale is named after a series of forts built by the United States during the Second Seminole War. The forts took their name from Major William Lauderdale (1782–1838), younger brother of Lieutenant Colonel James Lauderdale. Development of the city did not begin until 50 years after the forts were abandoned at the end of the conflict. Three forts named "Fort Lauderdale" were constructed, including the first at the fork of the New River, the second at Tarpon Bend on the New River between the present-day Colee Hammock and Rio Vista neighborhoods, and the third near the site of the Bahia Mar Marina.

Known as the "Venice of America", Fort Lauderdale has 165 miles of inland waterways across the city. In addition to tourism, Fort Lauderdale has a diversified economy including marine, manufacturing, finance, insurance, real estate, high technology, avionics/aerospace, film, and television production. The city is a popular tourist destination with an average year-round temperature of 75.5 °F (24.2 °C) and 3,000 hours of sunshine per year. Greater Fort Lauderdale, encompassing all of Broward County, hosted more than 13 million overnight visitors in 2018. Nearly four million cruise passengers annually pass through its Port Everglades, making it the world's third-busiest cruise port. With over 50,000 registered yachts and 100 marinas, Fort Lauderdale is also known as the "yachting capital of the world."

== History ==
The area of present-day Fort Lauderdale was inhabited for at least 2,000 years by Indigenous peoples associated with the Tequesta culture. Contact with Spanish explorers in the 16th century contributed to the decline of Native populations in South Florida through the introduction of Eurasian diseases, including smallpox, to which Indigenous communities had little immunity. Disease, warfare, and regional displacement contributed to the decline of the Tequesta and neighboring peoples over the following two centuries. The area was then incorporated within the Spanish Empire during the 16th century.

=== 18th century ===
By 1763, Native populations in South Florida had been greatly reduced, and surviving groups were reported to have migrated to Cuba when Spain ceded Florida to Great Britain under the Treaty of Paris (1763), which ended the Seven Years' War. Florida remained under British control until 1783, when Spain regained Florida with the Treaty of Paris (1783) that followed the British defeat in the American Revolutionary War.

=== 19th century ===
The area remained sparsely settled until the late 19th and early 20th centuries. Before the city developed, the area was commonly known as the "New River Settlement". In the 1830s, approximately 70 settlers were living along the New River. William Cooley, the local Justice of the Peace, was a farmer and wrecker, who traded with the Seminole Indians. On January 6, 1836, while Cooley was leading an attempt to salvage a wrecked ship, a band of Seminoles attacked his farm, killing his wife, children, and the children's tutor. The other farms in the settlement were not attacked, but all the white residents in the area abandoned the settlement, fleeing first to the Cape Florida Lighthouse on Key Biscayne, and then to Key West.

The first United States stockade, named Fort Lauderdale, was built in 1838. It was subsequently a site of fighting during the Second Seminole War. The fort was abandoned in 1842 after the war, and the area remained unsettled by colonists until the 1890s. In 1893, a ferry operated by Frank Stranahan provided transit across the New River. The Florida East Coast Railroad was also completed, providing a route through the area and sparking the city's development.

=== 20th century ===
In 1911, the city was incorporated. In 1915, it was designated the county seat of the newly formed Broward County.

Fort Lauderdale's first major development began in the 1920s, during the Florida land boom. The Great Miami Hurricane of 1926 and the Great Depression of the 1930s caused a great deal of economic dislocation. In July 1935, an African-American man named Rubin Stacy was accused of robbing a white woman at knifepoint. He was arrested and being transported to a Miami jail when police were run off the road by a mob. A group of 100 white men proceeded to hang Stacy from a tree near the scene of his alleged robbery. His body was riddled with some 20 bullets. The murder was subsequently used by the press in Nazi Germany to discredit U.S. critiques of its own persecution of Jews, Communists, and Catholics.

Andrews Ave, Fort Lauderdale, Florida, in approximately 1940

When World War II began, Fort Lauderdale became a major U.S. base, with a Naval Air Station to train pilots, radar operators, and fire control operators. A Coast Guard base at Port Everglades was also established.

Until July 1961, only whites were allowed on Fort Lauderdale beaches. There were no beaches for African-Americans in Broward County until 1954, when "the Colored Beach," today Dr. Von D. Mizell-Eula Johnson State Park, was opened in Dania Beach; however, no road was built to it until 1965. On July 4, 1961, African Americans started a series of wade-ins as protests at beaches that were off-limits to them, to protest "the failure of the county to build a road to the Negro beach." On July 11, 1962, a verdict by Ted Cabot went against the city's policy of racial segregation of public beaches, and Broward County beaches were desegregated in 1962.

Fort Lauderdale is a major center for yachting, one of the nation's largest tourist destinations, and the center of a metropolitan division with 1.8 million people.

=== Population ===
After end of World War II, service members returned to the area, spurring an enormous population explosion that dwarfed the 1920s boom. The 1960 census counted 83,648 people in the city, about 230% of the 1950 figure. A 1967 report estimated that the city was approximately 85% developed, and the 1970 population figure was 139,590.

After 1970, growth in the area shifted to suburbs to the west. As cities such as Coral Springs, Miramar, and Pembroke Pines experienced explosive growth, Fort Lauderdale's population stagnated, and the city actually shrank by almost 4,000 people between 1980, when the city had 153,279 people, and 1990, when the population was 149,377. A slight rebound brought the population back up to 152,397 at the 2000 census. Since 2000, Fort Lauderdale has gained slightly over 18,000 residents through annexation of seven neighborhoods in unincorporated Broward County.

== Geography ==
=== Location ===
According to the United States Census Bureau, the city has a total area of 38.6 square miles (99.9 km^{2}), 34.7 square miles (90.0 km^{2}) of which is land and 3.8 square miles (9.9 km^{2}) of which is water (9.87%). Fort Lauderdale is known for its extensive network of canals; there are 165 miles (266 km) of waterways within the city limits.

The city of Fort Lauderdale is adjacent to the Atlantic Ocean, includes 7 miles (11 km) of beaches, and borders the following municipalities:

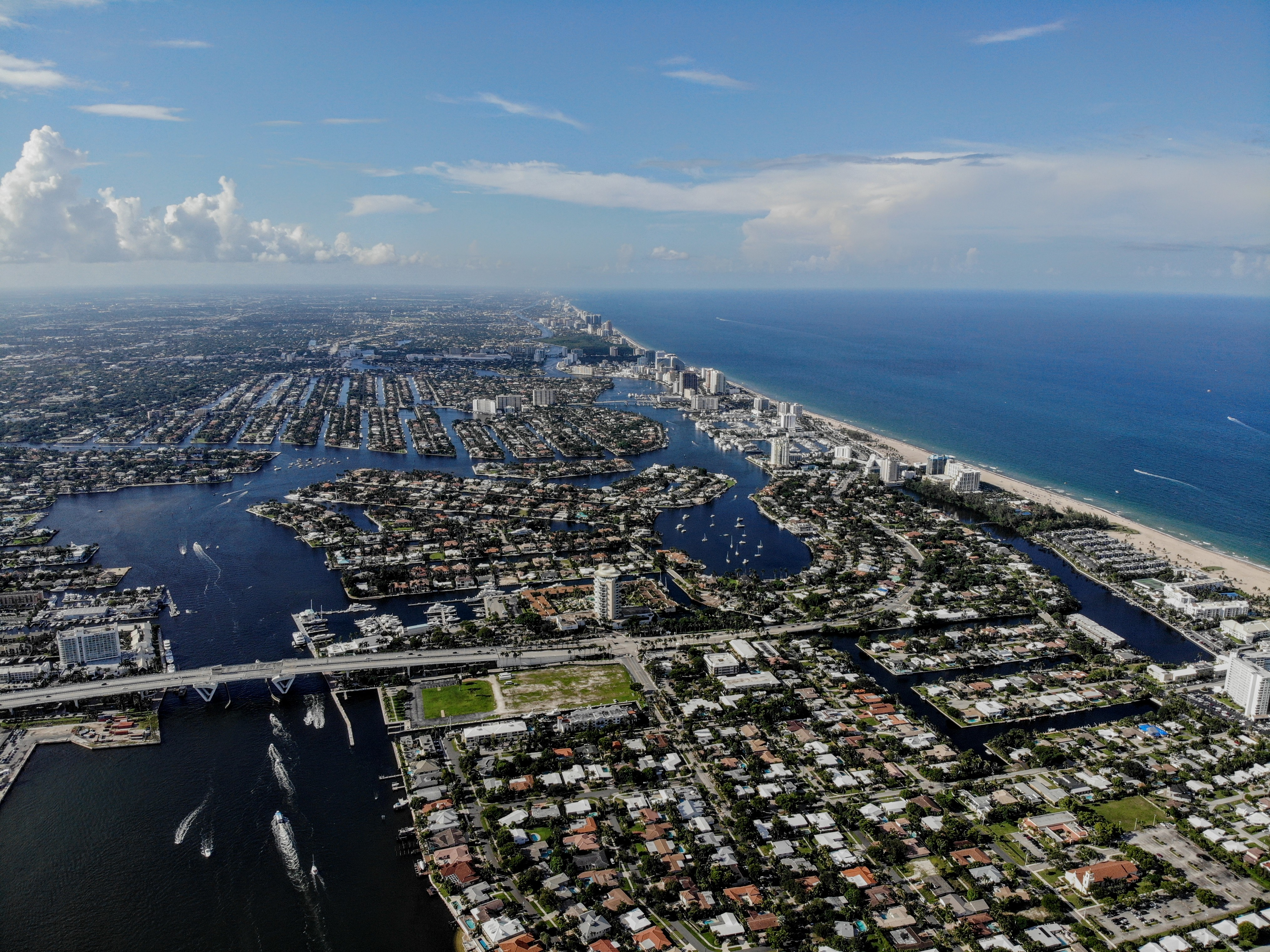
Aerial photo of Fort Lauderdale

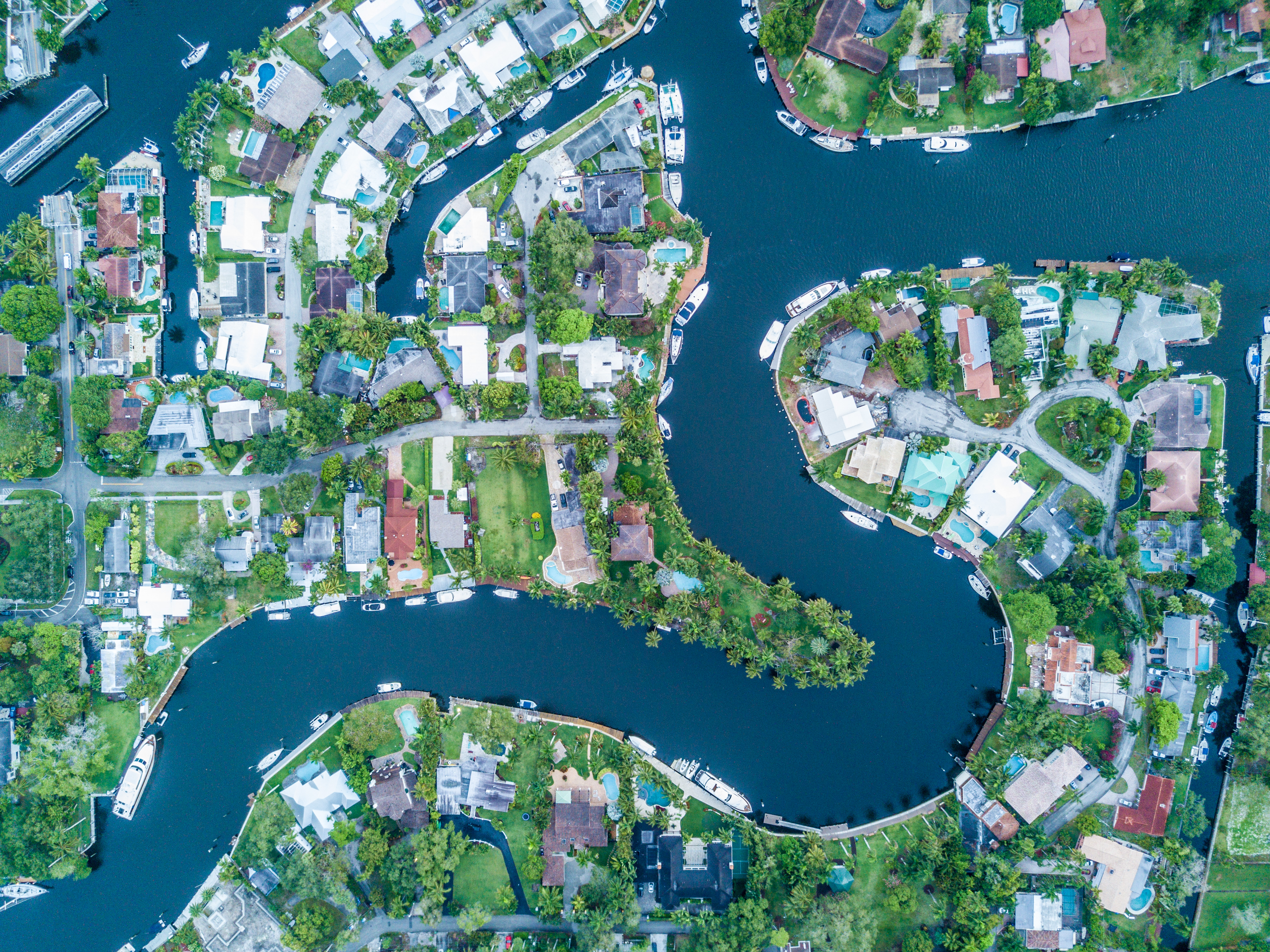
Tarpon River neighborhood in Fort Lauderdale

On its east:

- Lauderdale-by-the-Sea
- Sea Ranch Lakes

On its south:

- Hollywood
- Dania Beach

On its southwest:

- Davie

On its west:

- Plantation
- Lauderhill
- Lauderdale Lakes

On its northwest:

- North Lauderdale
- Oakland Park
- Tamarac

On its north:

- Wilton Manors
- Pompano Beach

The northwestern section of Fort Lauderdale is separate from the remainder of the city, connected only by the Cypress Creek Canal as it flows under I-95. This section of Fort Lauderdale borders the cities of Tamarac and Oakland Park on its south side. Oakland Park also borders Fort Lauderdale on the west side of its northeastern portion. The greater portion of Fort Lauderdale in the south is bordered, along its north side by Wilton Manors.

Off the coast of Fort Lauderdale is the Osborne Reef, an artificial reef made of discarded tires that has proven to be an ecological disaster. The dumping began in the 1960s, with the intent of providing habitat for fish, while disposing of trash from the land. However, in the rugged and corrosive environment of the ocean, nylon straps used to secure the tires wore out, cables rusted, and tires broke free. The tires posed a particular threat after breaking free from their restraints. The tires then migrated shoreward, and ran into a living reef tract, washed up on its slope, and killed many things in their path. In recent years, thousands of tires have also washed up on nearby beaches, especially during hurricanes. Local authorities are now working to remove the 700,000 tires, in cooperation with the U.S. Army, Navy, and Coast Guard.

=== Neighborhoods ===
Fort Lauderdale has a program for designating and recognizing neighborhoods. Under the Neighborhood Organization Recognition Program, more than 60 distinct neighborhoods have received official recognition from the city. An additional 25–30 neighborhoods exist without official recognition, although the city's neighborhood map displays them as well.

=== Climate ===
According to the Köppen climate classification, Fort Lauderdale has a tropical rainforest climate (Köppen Af). While the city does not have a fully dry season, much of the seasonal rainfall comes between May and October. Winters are frequently dry and sunny, and drought can be a concern in some years.

Fort Lauderdale is situated in USDA hardiness zones 10b to 11a near the coast.

The wet season runs from May through October, and weather is typically hot, humid, and wet with average high temperatures of 86–90 °F (30–32 °C) and lows of 73–78 °F (23–26 °C). During this period, more than half of summer days may bring brief afternoon or evening thunderstorms with lightning and bursts of intense rainfall. The record high temperature of 100 °F (38 °C) was recorded on June 22, 2009, and August 4, 1944.

The dry season often arrives some time in November, and lasts through early to mid April. Seasonable weather is often warm, dry, and sunny. Average high temperatures of 75–83 °F (24–28 °C) and lows of 60–70 °F (16–21 °C) are typical in the dry season. On rare occasions, cool fronts may make it all the way south to Fort Lauderdale, and the city will see a day or two of highs in the 60s °F (16–21 °C) and lows in the 40s °F (4–10 °C). Rare frosts occur every few decades, and only once in recorded history have snow flurries been reported in the air, which occurred on January 19, 1977. During the dry season (winter), brush fires can be a concern in many years.

Annual average precipitation is 60.95 inches (1,550 mm), with most of it occurring during the wet season from May through October. However, rainfall occurs in all months, even during the drier months from November through April, such as during the April 2023 flash flood where about two feet of rain fell in half a day. Fort Lauderdale has an average of 131 precipitation days annually. The hurricane season is between June 1 and November 30, with major hurricanes most likely to affect the city or state in September and October. The most recent storms to directly affect the city were Hurricane Irma in 2017, in addition to Hurricane Katrina and Hurricane Wilma, both of which struck the city in 2005. Other direct hits were Hurricane Cleo in 1964, Hurricane King in 1950, and the 1947 Fort Lauderdale Hurricane. On April 12, 2023, Fort Lauderdale received 25.91 inches (658 mm) of rainfall, causing historic flooding and the temporary closure of the Fort Lauderdale–Hollywood International Airport.

Climate data for Fort Lauderdale–Hollywood International Airport, Florida (1991–2020 normals, (Note: Mean monthly maxima and minima (i.e. the highest and lowest temperature readings during an entire month or year) calculated based on data at said location from 1991 to 2020.) extremes 1912–present)
Month	Jan	Feb	Mar	Apr	May	Jun	Jul	Aug	Sep	Oct	Nov	Dec	Year
Record high °F (°C)	92 (33)	94 (34)	94 (34)	96 (36)	99 (37)	100 (38)	99 (37)	100 (38)	99 (37)	95 (35)	91 (33)	90 (32)	100 (38)
Mean maximum °F (°C)	83.8 (28.8)	85.7 (29.8)	88.4 (31.3)	90.2 (32.3)	91.7 (33.2)	93.6 (34.2)	94.0 (34.4)	93.6 (34.2)	92.6 (33.7)	90.7 (32.6)	86.4 (30.2)	84.6 (29.2)	95.0 (35.0)
Mean daily maximum °F (°C)	75.6 (24.2)	77.4 (25.2)	79.7 (26.5)	82.9 (28.3)	85.8 (29.9)	88.4 (31.3)	90.0 (32.2)	90.0 (32.2)	88.3 (31.3)	85.4 (29.7)	80.8 (27.1)	77.7 (25.4)	83.5 (28.6)
Daily mean °F (°C)	68.3 (20.2)	70.3 (21.3)	72.6 (22.6)	76.4 (24.7)	79.7 (26.5)	82.5 (28.1)	83.8 (28.8)	84.0 (28.9)	82.7 (28.2)	79.9 (26.6)	74.6 (23.7)	71.2 (21.8)	77.2 (25.1)
Mean daily minimum °F (°C)	60.9 (16.1)	63.3 (17.4)	65.6 (18.7)	69.9 (21.1)	73.5 (23.1)	76.6 (24.8)	77.6 (25.3)	77.9 (25.5)	77.1 (25.1)	74.4 (23.6)	68.3 (20.2)	64.7 (18.2)	70.8 (21.6)
Mean minimum °F (°C)	43.1 (6.2)	47.0 (8.3)	50.8 (10.4)	58.3 (14.6)	65.8 (18.8)	71.0 (21.7)	72.3 (22.4)	72.6 (22.6)	72.3 (22.4)	63.8 (17.7)	54.3 (12.4)	48.1 (8.9)	40.7 (4.8)
Record low °F (°C)	28 (−2)	28 (−2)	32 (0)	40 (4)	49 (9)	57 (14)	64 (18)	66 (19)	61 (16)	46 (8)	35 (2)	29 (−2)	28 (−2)
Average precipitation inches (mm)	2.90 (74)	2.38 (60)	2.38 (60)	3.02 (77)	5.56 (141)	9.55 (243)	5.41 (137)	7.89 (200)	8.02 (204)	7.37 (187)	3.69 (94)	2.78 (71)	60.95 (1,548)
Average precipitation days (≥ 0.01 in)	7.0	5.9	6.3	6.6	10.4	16.0	15.7	17.0	16.1	12.2	9.6	8.4	131.2
Source: NOAA

== Demographics ==
Historical population
Census	Pop.	Note	%±
1920	2,065		—
1930	8,666		319.7%
1940	17,996		107.7%
1950	36,328		101.9%
1960	83,648		130.3%
1970	139,590		66.9%
1980	153,279		9.8%
1990	149,377		−2.5%
2000	152,397		2.0%
2010	165,521		8.6%
2020	182,760		10.4%
2024 (est.)	190,641	▲	4.3%
U.S. Decennial Census; 1920–1970 1980 1990; 2000 2010 2020 2022

Fort Lauderdale is the second-largest city in the Miami metropolitan area and the largest city in Broward County, holding nearly a tenth of the county's population. It grew at a fast pace throughout the first seventy years of the twentieth century, with its population expanding from 91 in 1900 to 139,590 in 1970. After this, it experienced a period of slow growth. During the 1970s, the city's population only grew by 10.2% to 153,279 in 1980.

This began a period of stagnation for the city of Fort Lauderdale, even as the metro area and the county continued their population boom. In the 1980s, the population of the city shrank for the first time, and by the 1990 census the number of residents of Fort Lauderdale fell just below 150,000. The next decade saw a slight rebound, but by the time of the 2000 census, the city's population was at 152,397, still below its first peak in 1980.

In the 21st century, the population grew significantly. By the 2010 census, the city's population had reached 165,521 as its population grew by 8.6% over the previous decade. By the 2020 census, the city's population had reached 182,760 as its population grew by 10.4% over the previous decade.

Historical demographics	2020	2010	2000	1990	1980
White (non-Hispanic)	47.5%	52.5%	57.5%	64.5%	74.5%
Black or African American (non-Hispanic)	27.1%	30.4%	28.5%	27.3%	20.5%
Hispanic or Latino	19.2%	13.7%	9.5%	7.2%	4.2%
Asian (non-Hispanic)	2.0%	1.5%	1.0%	0.8%	0.8%
Native American (non-Hispanic)	0.2%	0.2%	0.2%	0.2%	0.8%
Some other race (non-Hispanic)	0.7%	0.3%	0.2%	0.1%	0.8%
Two or more races (non-Hispanic)	3.3%	1.4%	3.2%	N/A	N/A
Population	182,760	165,521	152,397	149,377	153,279

Racial composition before 1980	1970	1960	1950	1940	1930
White (including Hispanic)	85.2%	76.5%	76.6%	71.2%	77.0%
Black or African American (including Hispanic)	14.6%	23.3%	23.4%	28.8%	23.0%
Asian (including Hispanic)	0.1%	N/A	N/A	N/A	N/A
Some other race (including Hispanic)	0.2%	0.1%	< 0.1%	< 0.1%	< 0.1%
Hispanic or Latino	2.2%	N/A	N/A	N/A	N/A
Non-Hispanic White	83.1%	N/A	N/A	N/A	N/A
Population	139,590	83,648	36,328	17,996	8,666

Demographic characteristics	2020	2010	2000	1990	1980
Households	103,140	93,159	80,862	66,440	67,623
Persons per household	1.77	1.78	1.88	2.25	2.27
Sex Ratio	109.7	111.8	110.0	101.7	92.5
Ages 0–17	16.2%	17.6%	19.4%	18.8%	19.3%
Ages 18–64	64.6%	67.1%	65.3%	63.4%	61.6%
Ages 65 +	19.2%	15.3%	15.3%	17.8%	19.1%
Median age	43.9	42.2	39.3	37.1	36.3
Population	182,760	165,521	152,397	149,377	153,279

Economic indicators
2017–21 American Community Survey	Fort Lauderdale	Broward County	Florida
Median income	$38,304	$36,222	$34,367
Median household income	$66,994	$64,522	$61,777
Poverty Rate	15.4%	12.4%	13.1%
High school diploma	89.1%	90.0%	89.0%
Bachelor's degree	39.3%	34.3%	31.5%
Advanced degree	15.5%	13.1%	11.7%

Language spoken at home (Note: Language spoken at home among residents at least five years old; only languages (or language groups) which at least 2% of residents have spoken at any time since 1980 are mentioned)	2015 (Note: Refers to 2013–2017 American Community Survey data; the last Decennial Census where language data was collected was in the 2000 census)	2010 (Note: Refers to 2008–2012 American Community Survey data; the last Decennial Census where language data was collected was in the 2000 census)	2000	1990	1980
English only	71.4%	74.0%	75.1%	80.7%	90.3%
Spanish or Spanish Creole	15.9%	13.0%	9.4%	6.8%	3.6%
French or Haitian Creole	6.9%	7.4%	9.6%	7.6%	1.6%
Other languages	5.8%	5.6%	5.9%	4.9%	4.5%

Nativity	2015 (Note: Refers to 2013–2017 American Community Survey data; the last Decennial Census where foreign-born population data was collected was in the 2000 census)	2010 (Note: Refers to 2008–2012 American Community Survey data; the last Decennial Census where foreign-born population data was collected was in the 2000 census)	2000	1990	1980
% population native-born	76.2%	78.1%	78.3%	82.6%	90.1%
... born in the United States	73.7%	75.7%	76.4%	80.8%	89.0%
... born in Puerto Rico or Island Areas	1.5%	1.5%	1.1%	0.9%	1.1%
... born to American parents abroad	1.0%	0.9%	0.8%	0.9%	1.1%
% population foreign-born (Note: Only countries of birth which at least 1.5% of residents were born in at any time since 1980 are mentioned)	23.8%	21.9%	21.7%	17.4%	9.9%
... born in Haiti	4.6%	4.1%	5.8%	4.3%	N/A (Note: Not counted separately; aggregated into "Other" category)
... born in Jamaica	2.3%	2.0%	1.7%	1.1%	0.7%
... born in Cuba	1.6%	1.8%	1.3%	1.2%	0.9%
... born in other countries	15.3%	14.0%	12.9%	10.8%	8.3%

As of 2010, those of (non-Hispanic white) European ancestry accounted for 52.5% of Fort Lauderdale's population. 10.3% of city residents were of Irish origin, 10.1% German, 8.1% Italian, 7.1% English, 3.0% Polish, 2.1% French, 1.9% Russian, 1.7% Scottish, 1.2% Scotch-Irish, 1.0% Dutch, 1.0% Swedish, 0.6% Greek, 0.6% Hungarian, 0.5% Norwegian, and 0.5% French Canadian.

As of 2010, those of African ancestry accounted for 31.0% of Fort Lauderdale's population, which includes African Americans. 10.0% of city residents were of West Indian or Afro-Caribbean American origin (6.4% Haitian, 2.5% Jamaican, 0.4% Bahamian, 0.2% Other or Unspecified West Indian, 0.2% British West Indian, 0.1% Trinidadian and Tobagonian, 0.1% Barbadian), 0.6% were Black Hispanics, and 0.5% Subsaharan African.

As of 2010, those of Hispanic or Latino ancestry accounted for 13.7% of Fort Lauderdale's population. 2.5% of city residents were of Cuban origin, 2.3% Puerto Rican, 1.7% Mexican, 1.1% Colombian, 0.9% Guatemalan, 0.8% Salvadoran, 0.6% Honduran, and 0.6% Peruvian.

As of 2010, those of Asian ancestry accounted for 1.5% of Fort Lauderdale's population. 0.4% of city residents were of Indian origin, 0.3% Filipino, 0.3% Other Asian, 0.2% Chinese, 0.1% Vietnamese, 0.1% Japanese, and 0.1% Korean.

As of 2010, 0.6% were of Arab ancestry.

In 2010, 7.1% of the population considered themselves to be of only American ancestry (regardless of race or ethnicity).

In 2000, Fort Lauderdale had the twenty-sixth highest percentage of Haitian residents in the United States, at 6.9% of the city's population, and the 127th highest percentage of Cuban residents, at 1.7% of the city's residents.

The city, along with adjacent small cities Oakland Park and Wilton Manors, is known for its notably large LGBT community, and has one of the highest ratios of gay men and lesbians, with gay men being more largely present. The city is also known as a popular vacation spot for gays and lesbians, with many LGBT or LGBT-friendly hotels and guesthouses. Fort Lauderdale hosts the Stonewall Library & Archives, and in neighboring Wilton Manors, there is the Pride Center, a large LGBT community center, in addition to the World AIDS Museum and Educational Center. The current mayor of Fort Lauderdale, Dean Trantalis, is the first openly gay person to hold this office.

== Economy ==
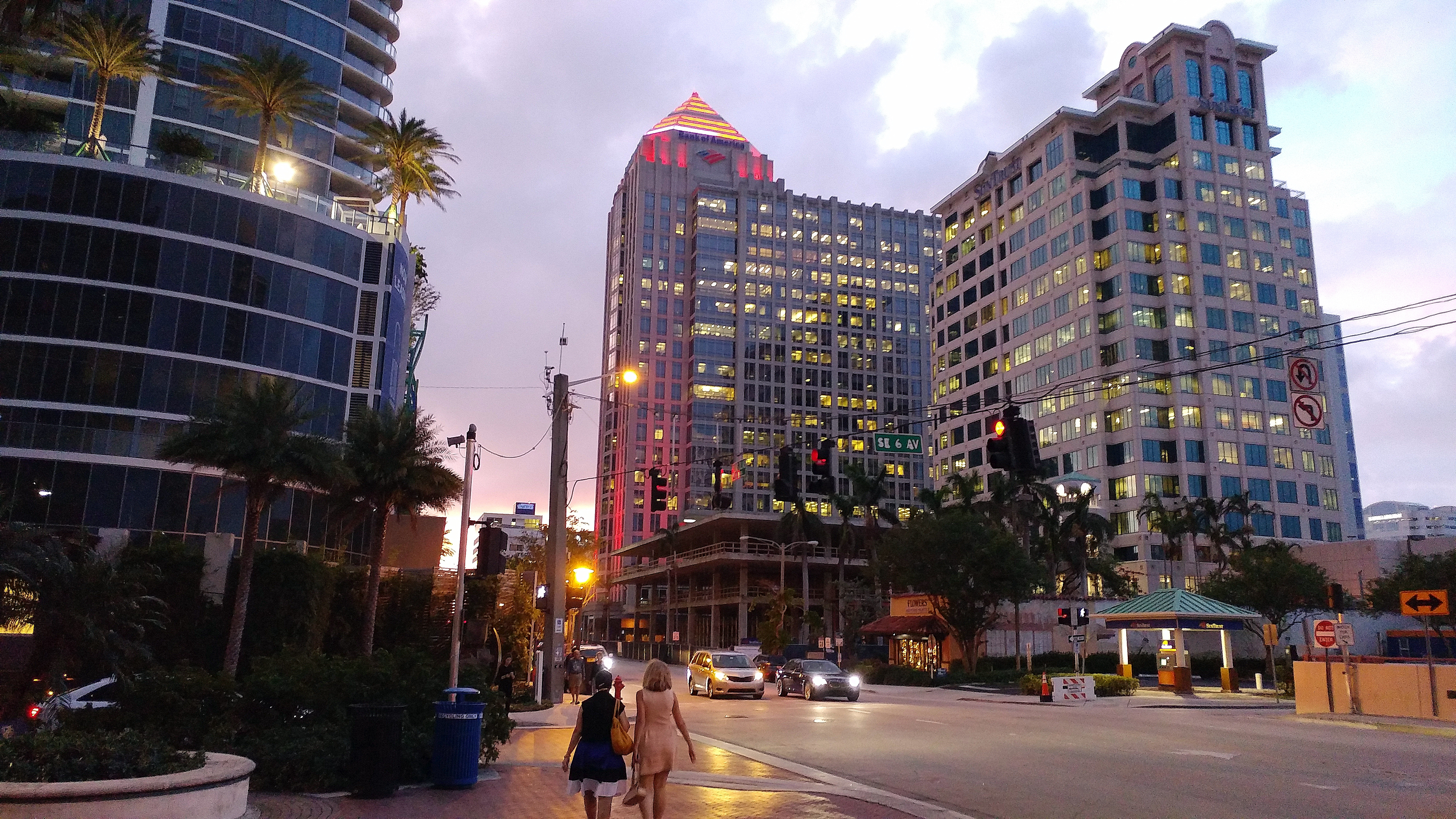
Fort Lauderdale's central business district is the largest in Broward County, and second-largest in South Florida after Miami.

Fort Lauderdale's economy has diversified over time. From the 1940s through the 1980s, the city was known as a spring break destination for college students. The college crowd has since dwindled, however, with the city now attracting wealthier tourists. Cruise ships and nautical recreation provide the basis for much of the revenue raised by tourism. There is a convention center west of the beach and southeast of downtown, with 600,000 square feet (55,742 m^{2}) of space, including a 200,000-square-foot (18,581 m^{2}) main exhibit hall. Approximately 30% of the city's 10 million annual visitors attend conventions at the center.

The downtown area, especially around Las Olas Boulevard, first underwent redevelopment starting in 2002, and now hosts many new hotels and high-rise condominium developments. The city's central business district is the largest downtown in Broward County, although there are other cities in the county with commercial centers. Office buildings and high-rises include: Las Olas River House, Las Olas Grand, 110 Tower (formerly AutoNation Tower), Bank of America Plaza, One Financial Plaza, Broward Financial Center, One East Broward Boulevard, Barnett Bank Plaza, PNC Center, New River Center, One Corporate Center, SunTrust Centre, 101 Tower, and SouthTrust Tower.

Fort Lauderdale is a major manufacturing and maintenance center for yachts. The boating industry is responsible for over 109,000 jobs in the county. With its many canals, and proximity to the Bahamas and Caribbean, it is also a popular yachting vacation stop, and home port for 42,000 boats, and approximately 100 marinas and boatyards. Additionally, the annual Fort Lauderdale International Boat Show, the world's largest boat show, brings over 125,000 people to the city each year.

=== Top employers ===
According to the Greater Fort Lauderdale Alliance 2020 report, the city's top employers include:

Employer	Employees
AutoNation	3,000
Citrix	1,700
Kaplan	1,291
Rick Case Automotive Group	905
Sun-Sentinel	897

== Arts and culture ==
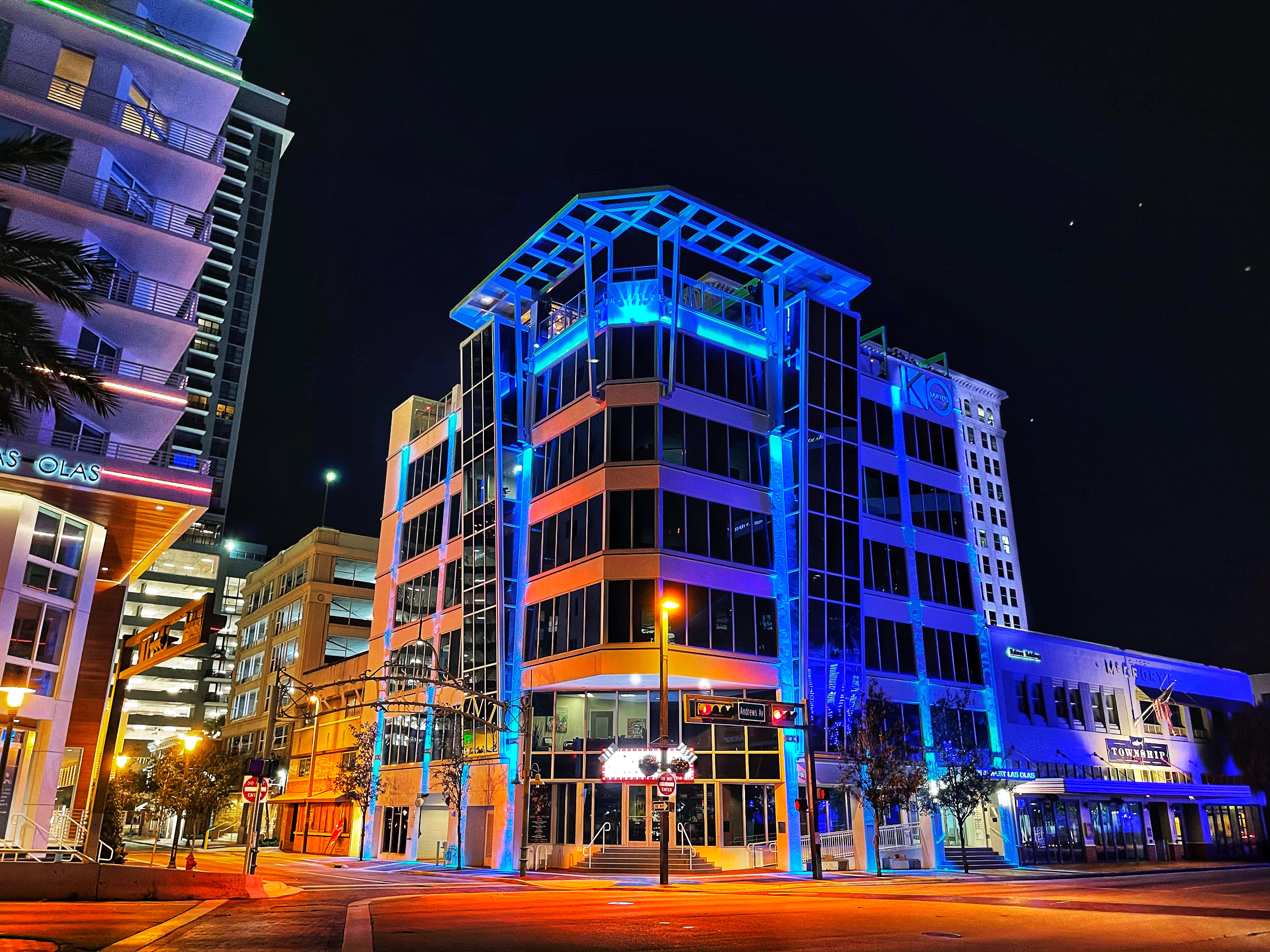
Downtown nightlife

Like many parts of Florida, the city's population has a strong seasonal variation, as "snowbirds" from the northern United States, Canada, and Europe spend the winter and spring in Florida. The city is known for its beaches, bars, nightclubs, and history as a spring break location, back in the 1960s and 1970s, for tens of thousands of college students. The city has discouraged college students from visiting the area since the mid-1980s, however, by passing strict laws aimed at preventing the mayhem that occurred in the 1970s and 1980s. The city had an estimated 350,000 college visitors for spring break 1985; by 1989, that number had declined to about 20,000. Since the 1990s, Fort Lauderdale has increasingly catered to those seeking the resort lifestyle seasonally or year-round, and is often a host city to many professional venues, concerts, and art shows.

Fort Lauderdale's arts and entertainment district, otherwise known as the Riverwalk Arts & Entertainment District, runs east–west along Las Olas Boulevard, from the beach to the heart of downtown. The district is anchored in the West by the Broward Center for the Performing Arts, and runs through the city to the intersection of Las Olas and A1A. This intersection is the "ground zero" of Fort Lauderdale Beach, and is the site of the Elbo Room bar featured in the 1960 film Where the Boys Are, which led in large measure to the city's former reputation as a spring break mecca. The city and its suburbs host over 4,100 restaurants and over 120 nightclubs, many of them in the arts and entertainment district. The city is also the setting for the 1986 movie Flight of the Navigator, and host of Langerado, an annual music festival. In 2013, the county welcomed about 1.3 million LGBT travelers who spent about $1.5 billion in area restaurants, hotels, attractions, and shops, according to the Greater Fort Lauderdale Convention & Visitors Bureau.

=== Film festival ===
The Fort Lauderdale International Film Festival has been presented annually since 1986.

=== Sites of interest ===
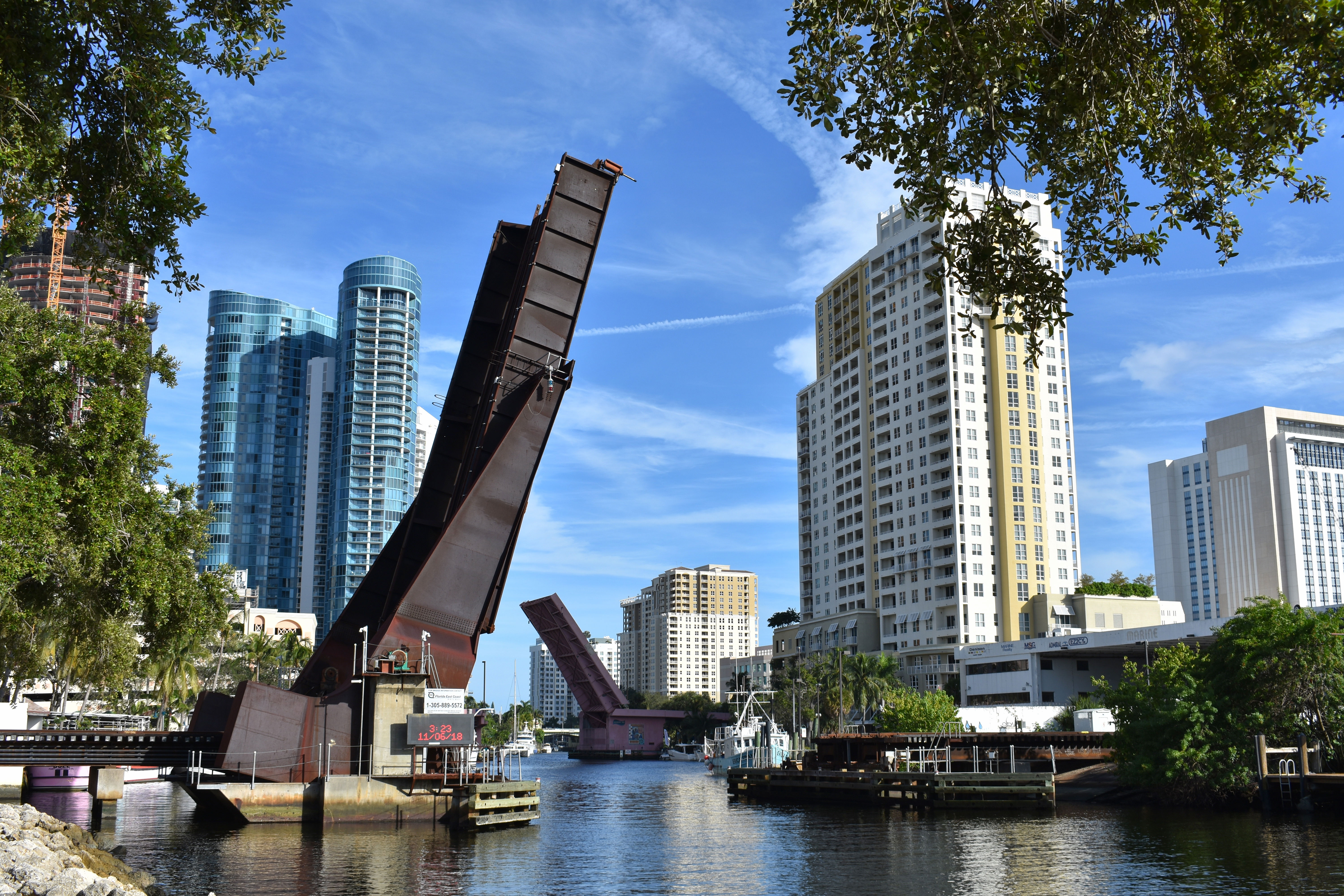
The New River provides a popular and scenic route for watercraft.

Hugh Taylor Birch State Park is a 180-acre (0.73 km^{2}) park along the beach, with nature trails, camping and picnicking areas, canoeing, and features the Terramar Visitor Center, with exhibits about the ecosystem of the park. Hugh Taylor Birch came to Florida in 1893. He purchased ocean-front property for about a dollar per acre, he eventually owned a 3.5-mile stretch of beachfront. The Bonnet House is a historic home in Fort Lauderdale, Florida, United States. Bonnet House's modern history began when Birch gave the Bonnet House property as a wedding gift to his daughter, Helen, and her husband, Chicago artist Frederic Clay Bartlett in 1919. The site was listed on the National Register of Historic places in 1984, and declared a historic landmark by the City of Fort Lauderdale in 2002.

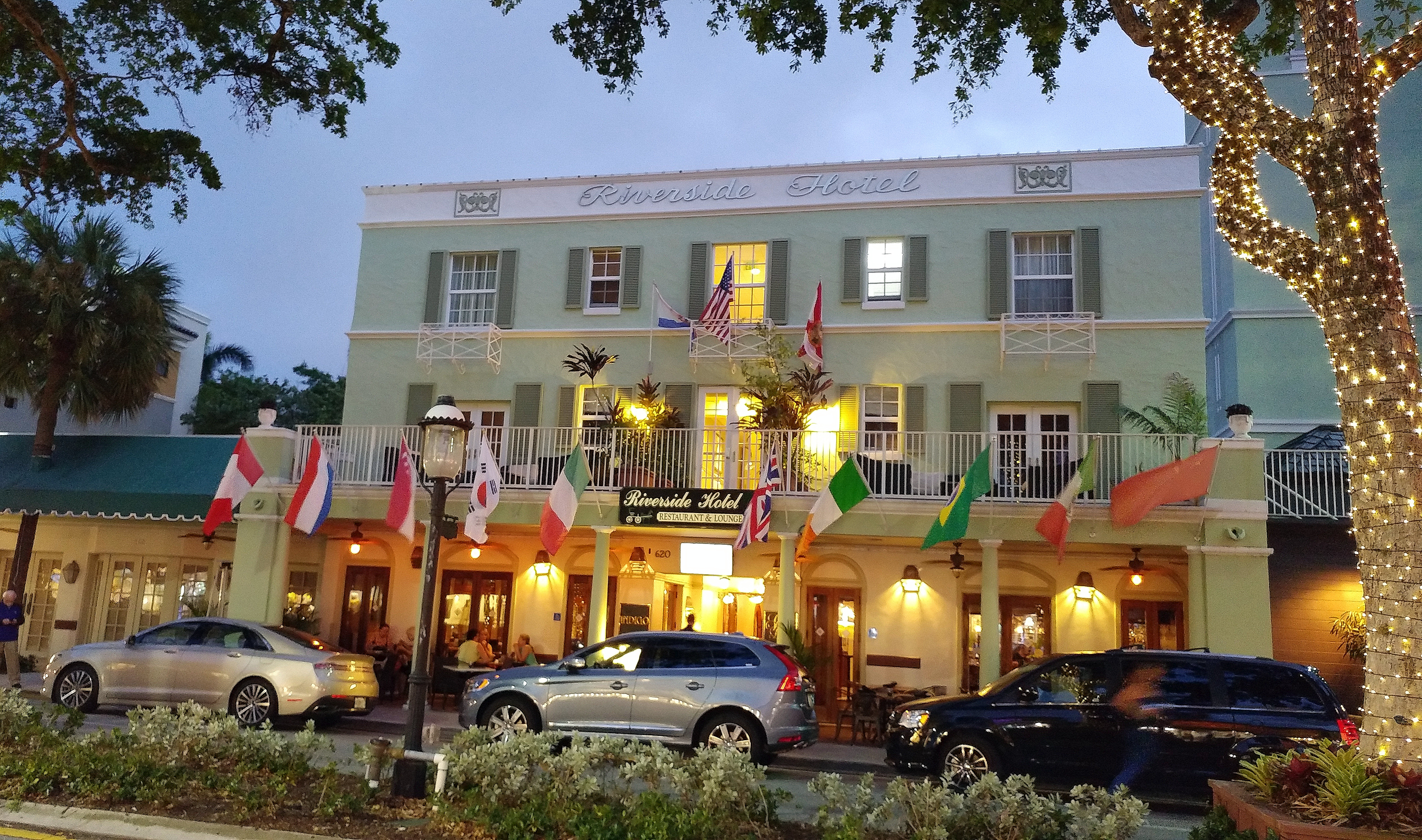
The Riverside Hotel, Fort Lauderdale's oldest operating hotel

Henry E. Kinney Tunnel on U.S. Route 1 is the only tunnel on a state road in the state of Florida. It was constructed in 1960, and its 864-foot (263 m) length travels underneath the New River and Las Olas Boulevard.

The Riverwalk Arts and Entertainment District in downtown Fort Lauderdale features the Broward Center for the Performing Arts; Museum of Discovery and Science, with its AutoNation 3D IMAX Theater; Florida Grand Opera; Fort Lauderdale Historical Center; Stranahan House; the Riverside Hotel; and the Museum of Art.

Las Olas Boulevard is a thoroughfare in downtown Fort Lauderdale that runs from Andrews Avenue in the Central Business District to A1A and Fort Lauderdale Beach. The boulevard is a popular attraction for locals and visitors, being close to Fort Lauderdale beach, Fort Lauderdale-Hollywood International Airport, and Port Everglades.

In addition to its museums, beaches, and nightlife, Fort Lauderdale is home to: the Fort Lauderdale Swap Shop, a large indoor/outdoor flea market, and the site of the world's largest drive-in movie theater, with 13 screens; North Woodlawn Cemetery, an African-American cemetery east of Interstate 95 near Sunrise Boulevard, which was added to the National Register of Historic Places in 2017; Calvary Chapel Fort Lauderdale, an evangelical megachurch in Fort Lauderdale; and the annual Fort Lauderdale International Boat Show, where almost 500 boats, yachts, and mega-yachts are on display.

=== Historic structures ===
The following are images of some of the remaining historical structures in Fort Lauderdale. Some are listed in the National Register of Historic Places:

Fort Lauderdale, Florida
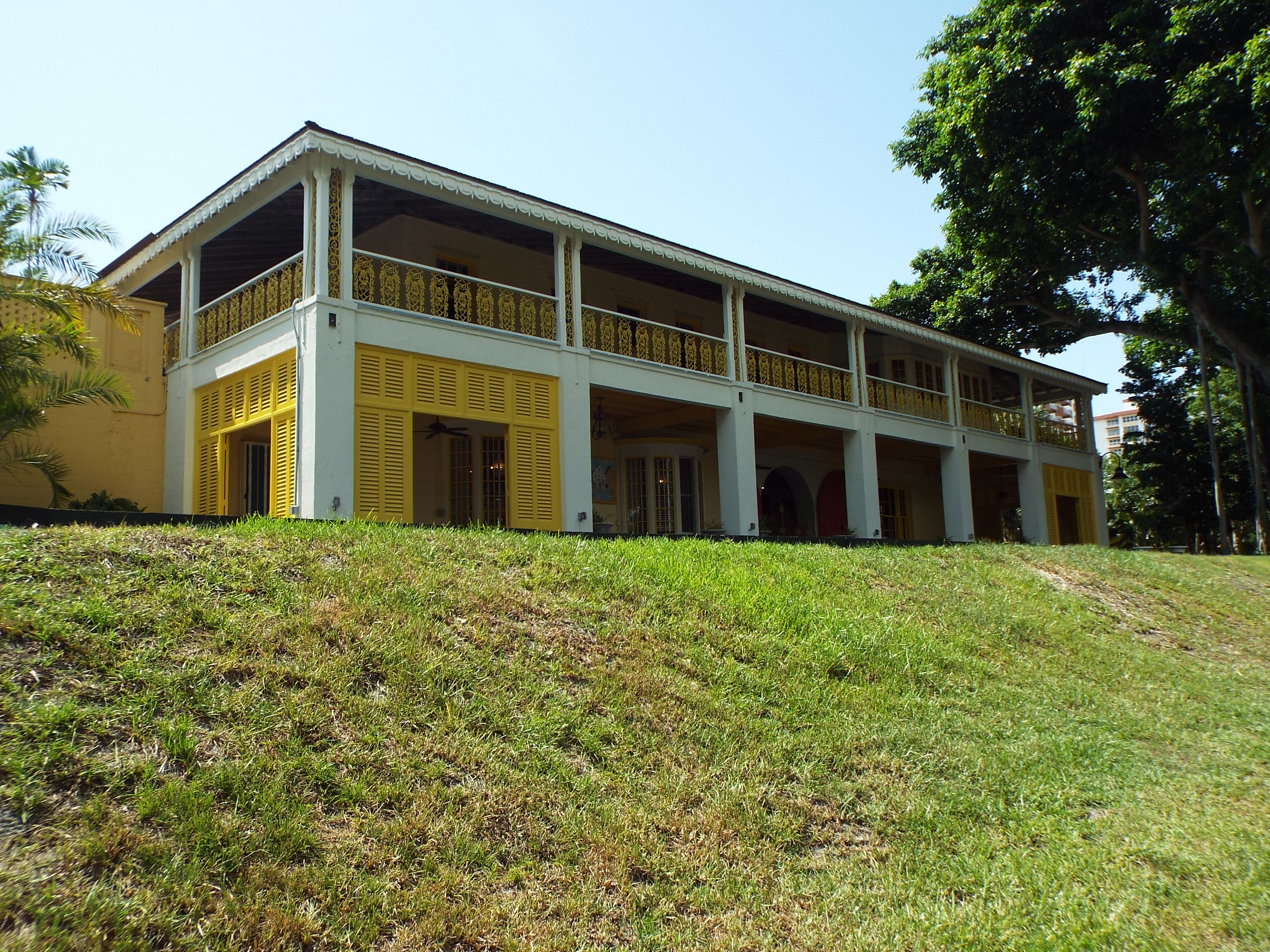
The Bonnet House was built in 1895 and is at 900 Birch Road. In 1919, the owner, Hugh Taylor Birch, gave the property to his daughter Helen and artist Frederic Clay Bartlett as a wedding gift. The property was listed in the National Register of Historic Places on July 5, 1984; reference #84000832.

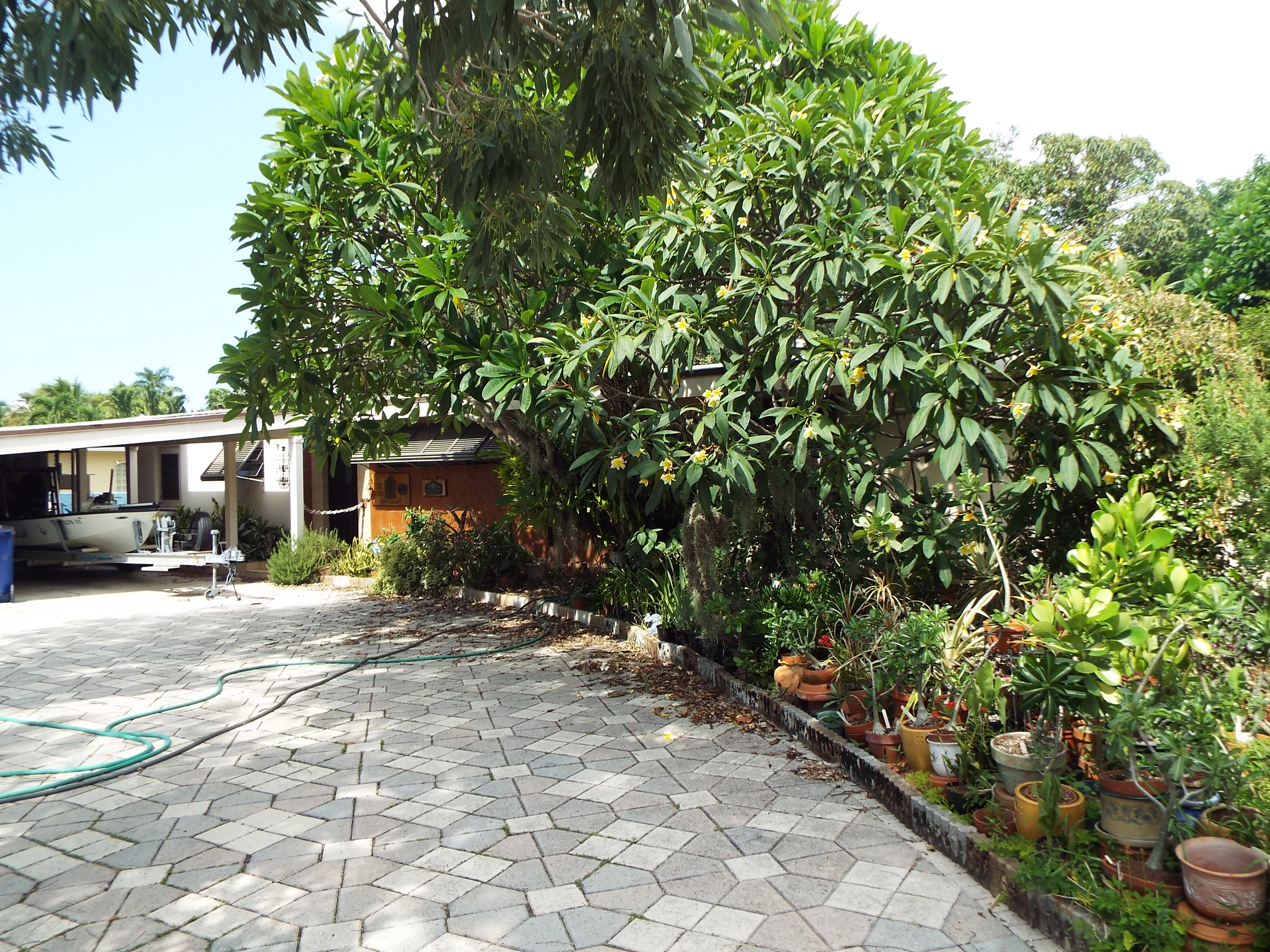
The Dr. Willard Van Orsdel King House was built in 1951 and is at 1336 Seabreeze Boulevard. On February 21, 2006, it was listed in the National Register of Historic Places; reference #06000059.

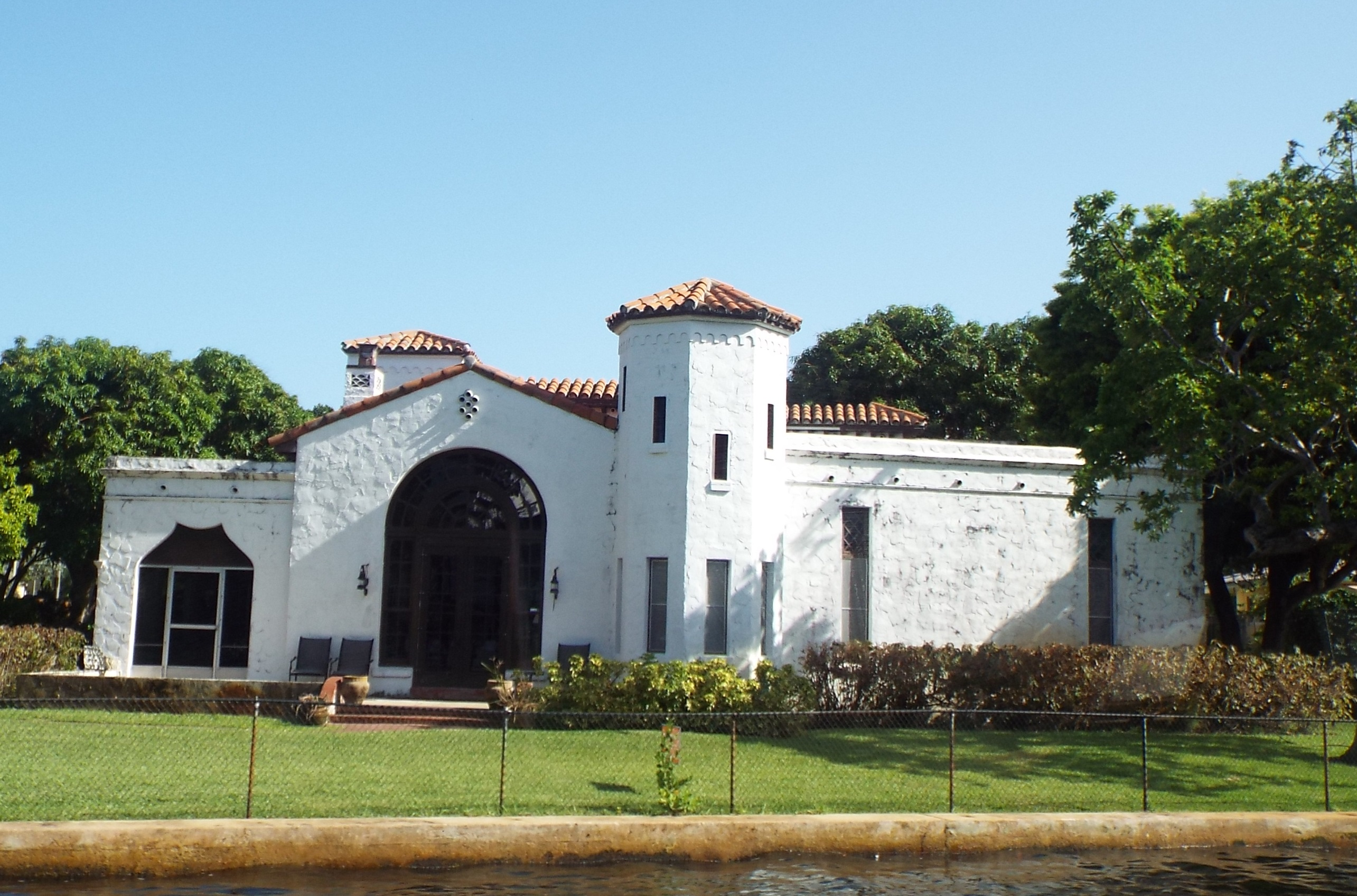
The Benjamin "Bugsy" Siegel House in Fort Lauderdale, Florida along the riverside of New River. This was the residence of the infamous mobster known as Bugsy Seigel.

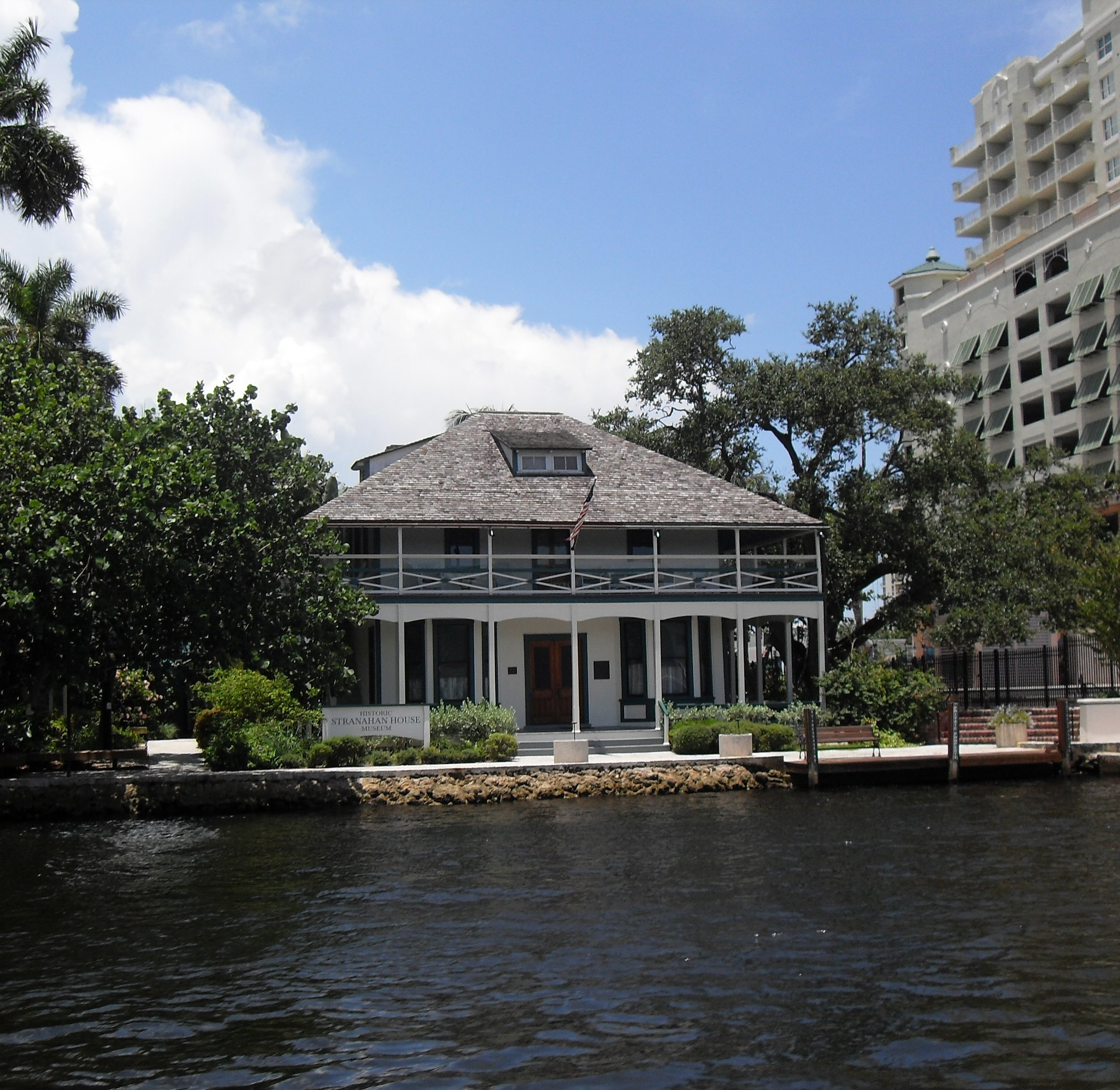
Stranahan House, the oldest building in Fort Lauderdale, originally built as a trading post.

== Sports ==
Lockhart Stadium in Fort Lauderdale was the home of the Fort Lauderdale Strikers, which played in the most recent incarnation of the North American Soccer League. It was the home of the original Fort Lauderdale Strikers, which played in the previous version of the North American Soccer League. The Miami Fusion of Major League Soccer played home games at this stadium from 1998 to 2002. The Florida Atlantic University Owls football team played its home games at Lockhart Stadium from 2003 through 2010.

The Fort Lauderdale Fighting Squids compete in the United States Australian Football League.

The New York Yankees, Baltimore Orioles, and Kansas City Royals used to conduct spring training in the city at Fort Lauderdale Stadium.

Fort Lauderdale is also home to the Fort Lauderdale Aquatic Complex, which is at the International Swimming Hall of Fame. It contains two 25-yard (23 m) by 50-meter competition pools, as well as one 20 by 25-yard (23 m) diving well. The complex is open to Fort Lauderdale residents, and has also been used in many different national and international competitions since its opening in 1965. Ten world records have been set there, from Catie Ball's 100 m breaststroke in 1966, to Michael Phelps' 400 m individual medley in 2002.

Chase Stadium was opened in 2020 as the home of Inter Miami CF II (then Fort Lauderdale CF) which played in USL League One from 2020 to 2021 and plays in MLS Next Pro from 2022, and was the temporary home of 2020 MLS expansion team Inter Miami CF, until the completion of Nu Stadium in Miami in 2026.

The War Memorial Auditorium has hosted professional wrestling, boxing, and mixed martial arts shows since its opening in 1950. In 2019, the Florida Panthers signed a 50-year lease with the venue, with plans to renovate it and add hockey facilities.

The Fort is a pickleball center that opened in 2024. It feature 43 pickleball courts, including the world's first dedicated pickleball stadium, a 4,000-square-foot (370 m^{2}) event center, and several other sporting and entertainment venues. It serves as the headquarters and training center for the Association of Pickleball Players.

Fort Lauderdale United is a professional women's soccer team who plays in the USL Super League at Beyond Bancard Field. The team is set to launch a men's side in USL League One in 2026.

== Government ==
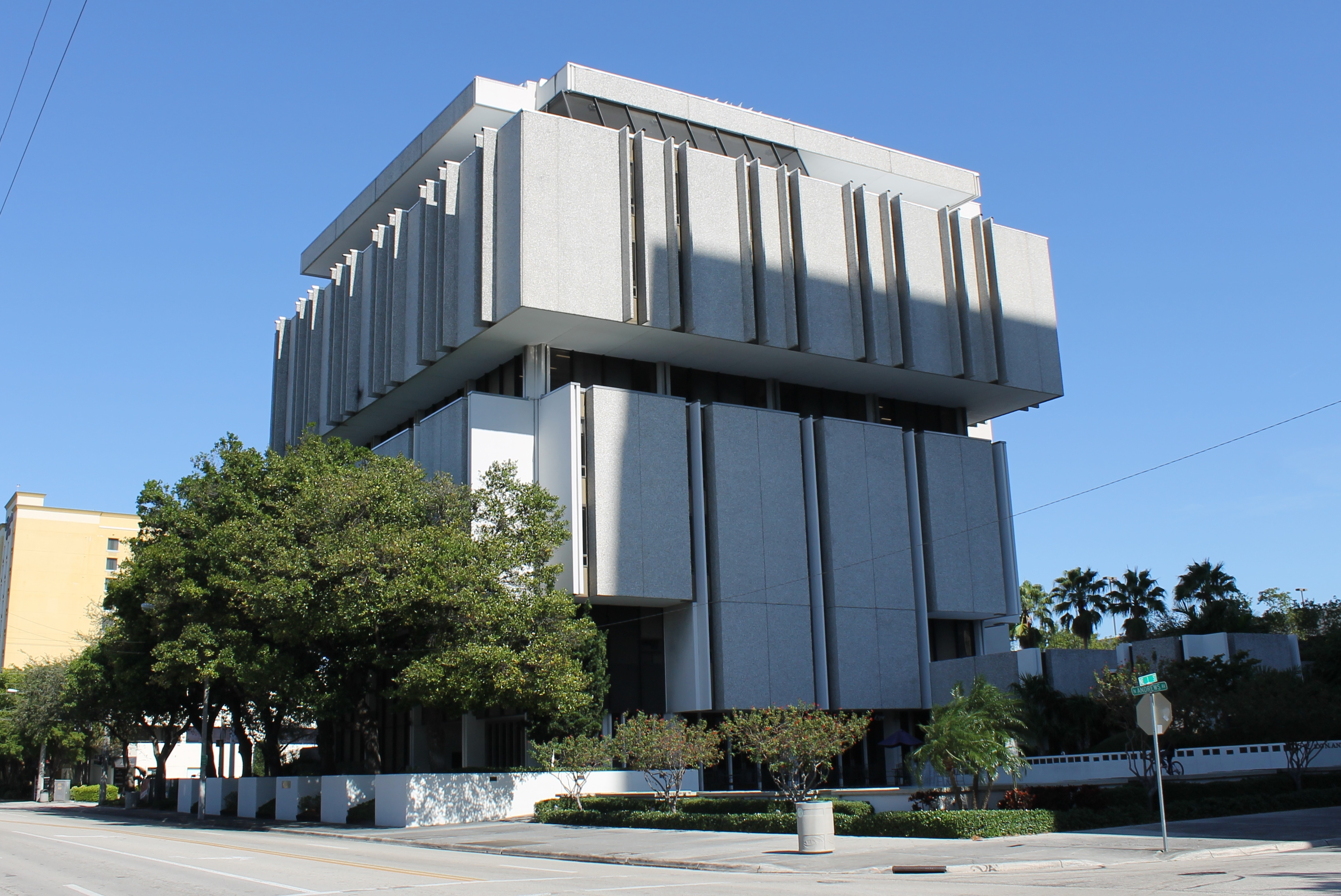
Fort Lauderdale City Hall

Fort Lauderdale has a commission-manager form of government. City policy is set by a city commission of five elected members: the mayor and four district commission members. In 1998, the municipal code was amended to limit the mayoral term. The mayor of Fort Lauderdale now serves a three-year term, and cannot serve more than three consecutive terms. The current mayor is Dean Trantalis, who succeeded Jack Seiler in 2018. The longest-serving mayor is Jim Naugle, who served from 1991 to 2009. Administrative functions are performed by a city manager, who is appointed by the city commission. Fort Lauderdale Fire-Rescue Department provides Fire and Emergency Medical Services.

The town of Fort Lauderdale council in 1911 appointed Kossie A. Goodbread as its first City Marshal. G. D. Tenbrook, appointed Marshal in 1920, was the first to receive the title of Chief of Police. Between 1924 and 1926, the size of the Fort Lauderdale Police Department increased from two officers to 26 officers. Scott Israel, later the Sheriff of Broward County and the Opa-locka Police Chief, worked for the Fort Lauderdale Police Department from 1979 to 2004. As of 2022, the department had 499 officers.

== Education ==
According to 2000 census data, 79.0% of the city's population aged 25 or older were high school graduates, slightly below the national figure of 80.4%. Additionally, 27.9% held at least a baccalaureate, slightly higher than the national figure of 24.4%. Broward County Public Schools operates 23 public schools in Fort Lauderdale. The 2007 Florida Comprehensive Assessment Test (FCAT) results for Fort Lauderdale's public schools were mixed; while 10 (of 16) elementary schools and one (of four) middle schools received "A" or "B" grades, Sunland Park Elementary School and Arthur Ashe Middle School received failing grades. Boyd Anderson High School, which is in Lauderdale Lakes but whose attendance zone includes part of Fort Lauderdale, also received a failing grade. None of the three failing schools have failed twice in a four-year period, thus triggering the "Opportunity Scholarship Program" school choice provisions of the Florida's education plan.

Ten institutions of higher learning have main or satellite campuses in the city:

- The Art Institute of Fort Lauderdale
- Broward College BC (Willis Holcombe Downtown Center)
- City College
- Embry-Riddle Aeronautical University (satellite campus)
- Florida Atlantic University FAU (satellite campus)
- Florida International University FIU (satellite campus)
- Keiser University
- Jersey College
- Nova Southeastern University NSU
- University of Phoenix (Cypress Creek Learning Center)

Additionally, the Davenport, Iowa-based Kaplan University's Corporate headquarters and an academic support center are in the city.

== Media ==
Fort Lauderdale is served by English-language newspapers South Florida-Sun Sentinel and The Miami Herald, Spanish-language newspapers El Sentinel, El Nuevo Herald, and an alternative newspaper New Times Broward-Palm Beach.

== Transportation ==
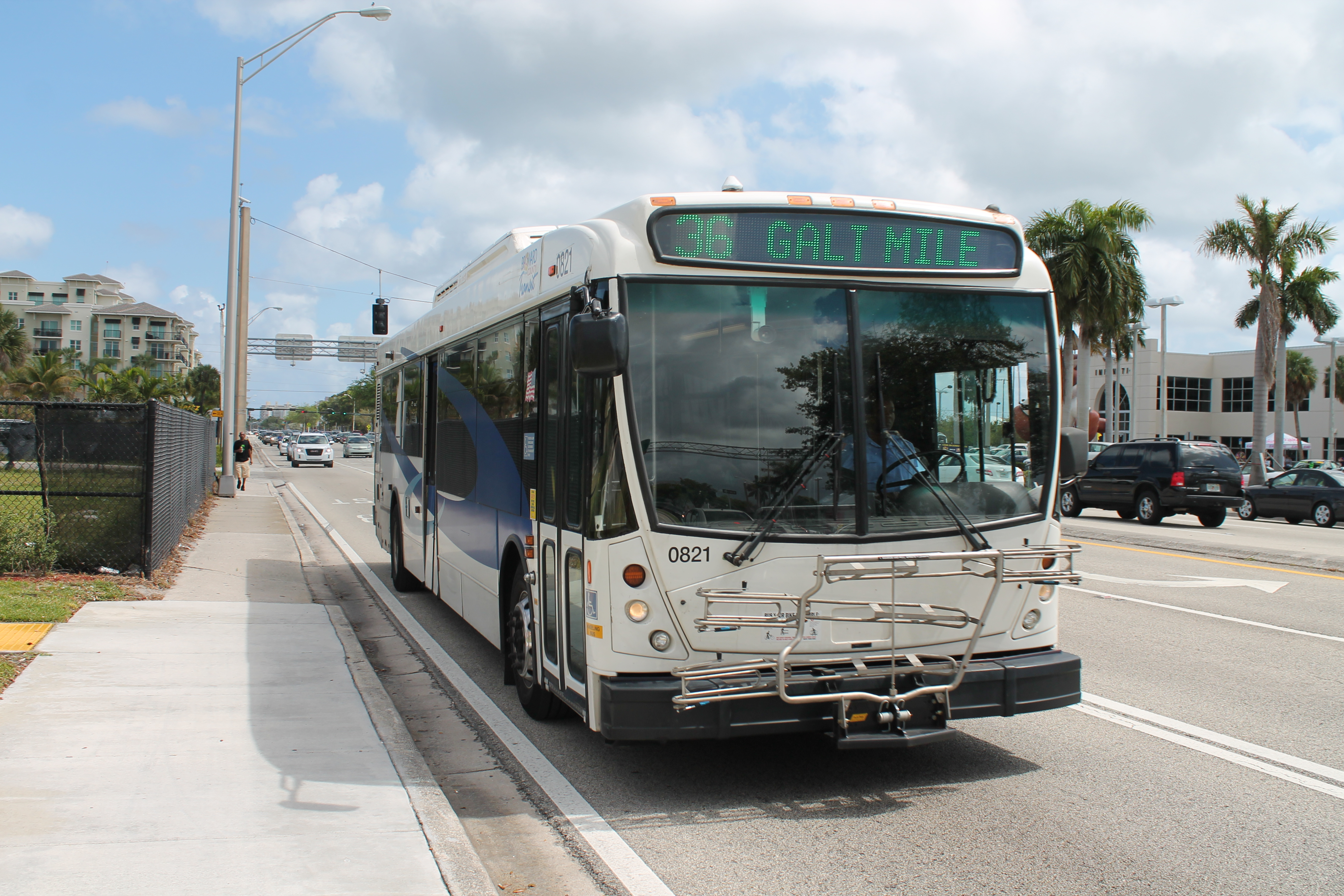
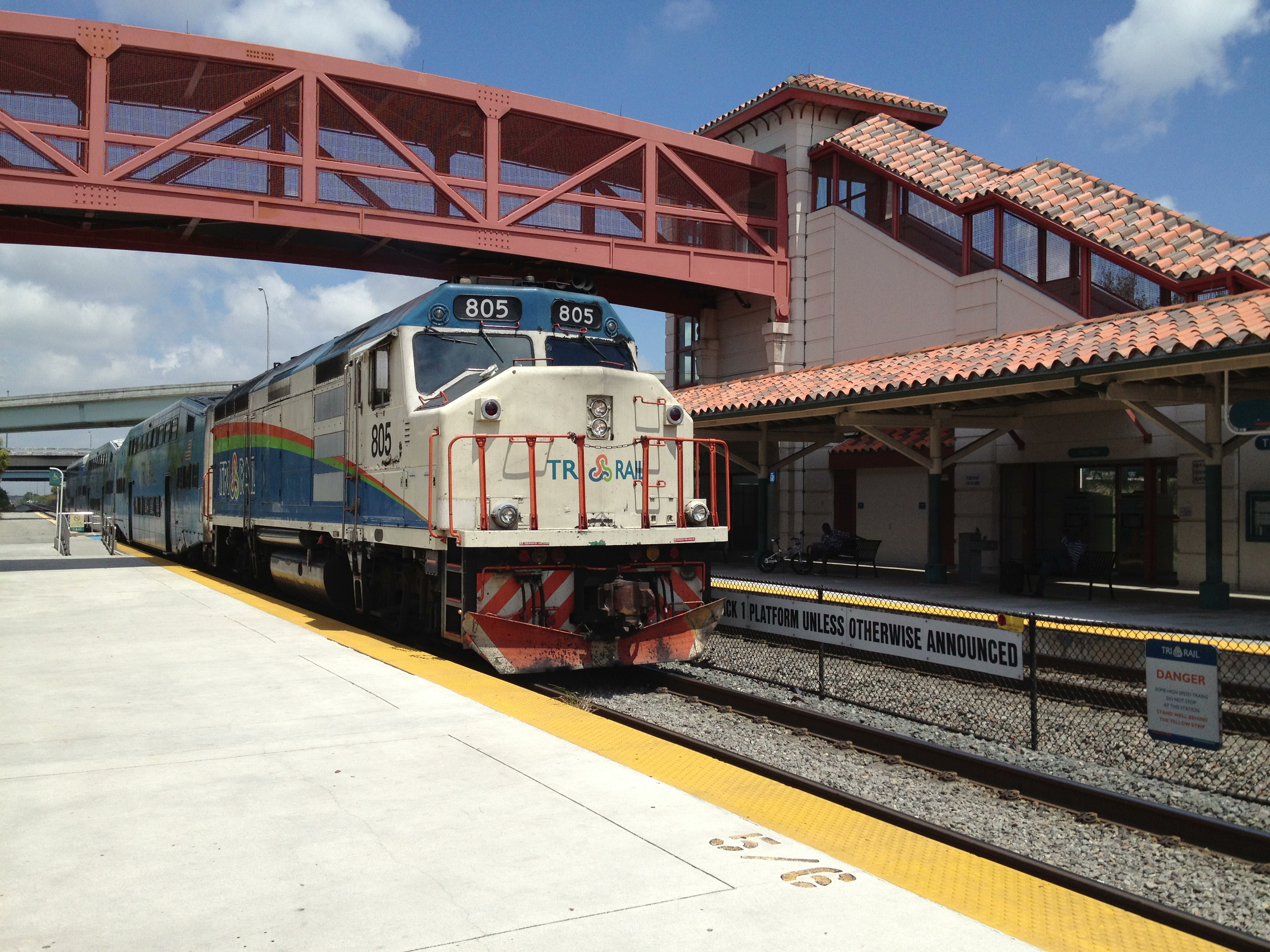
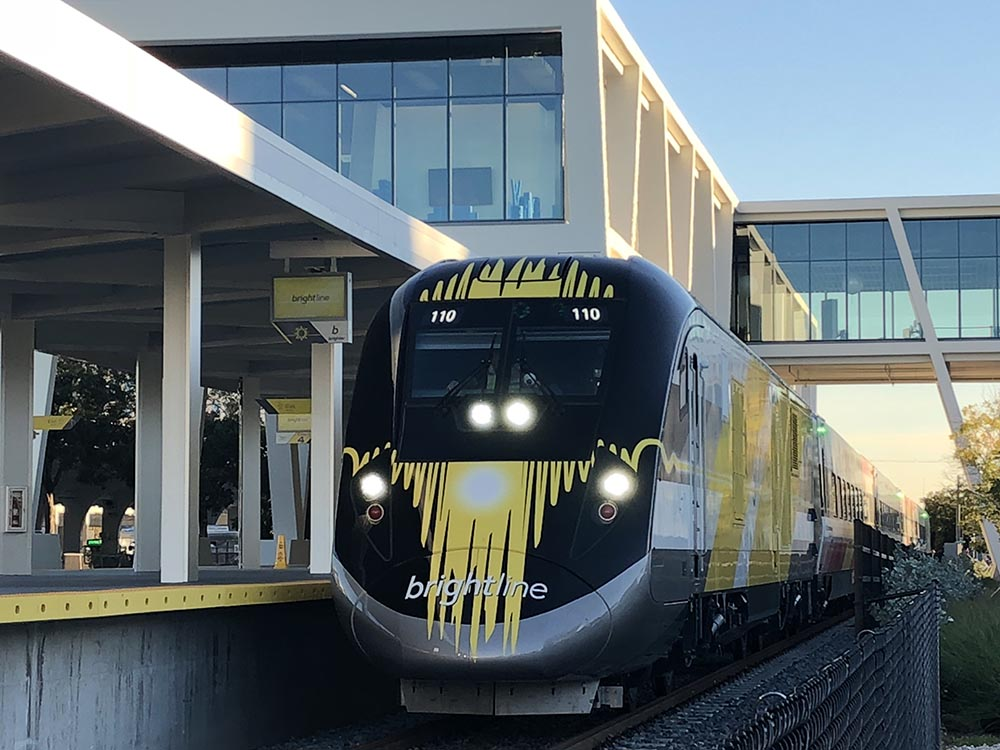
Fort Lauderdale is serviced by three major forms of public transit: Broward County Transit bus system (top), commuter rail Tri-Rail (middle), and inter-city rail Brightline (bottom).

=== Transit ===
Broward County Transit (BCT), the county bus system, provides local bus transportation. BCT provides for connections with the bus systems in other parts of the metropolitan area: Metrobus in Dade County, and Palm Tran in Palm Beach County. Tri-Rail, a commuter rail system, connects south Florida's major cities and airports. In November 2006, Broward County voters rejected a one-cent-per-hundred sales tax increase intended to fund transportation projects, such as light rail and bus system expansion. The Wave, a new 2.7-mile (4.3 km) electric streetcar system costing $125 million, was being planned for the downtown. Most of the construction funding would have come from federal ($62.5 million), state ($37 million), and city taxpayers ($10.5 million), with approximately $15 million from assessments on properties within the Downtown Development Authority. Broward County (BCT) had committed to operating the system for the first 10 years at an expected annual cost of $2 million, and had guaranteed funding to cover any shortfall in ridership revenues. The construction cost of $50 million per mile was considerably higher than other recently built streetcar projects, in part due to the challenges of building an electric transit system over the 3rd Avenue drawbridge. The project was canceled in 2018 by the city and the county.

The Sun Trolley is a bus service, running buses (styled as streetcars) around Fort Lauderdale and Broward County.

=== Passenger rail ===
Brightline has a station in Fort Lauderdale, which connects to Miami and West Palm Beach with multiple trains daily. Construction recently completed extending the line beyond West Palm Beach to Orlando.

Tri-Rail also provides daily commuter service between Palm Beach County, Broward County (including two stations in Fort Lauderdale), and Miami-Dade County with dozens of local stations. Amtrak provides long-distance passenger service daily on the Silver Meteor and Silver Star lines connecting to cities on the Atlantic coast via the Fort Lauderdale station.

=== Airports ===
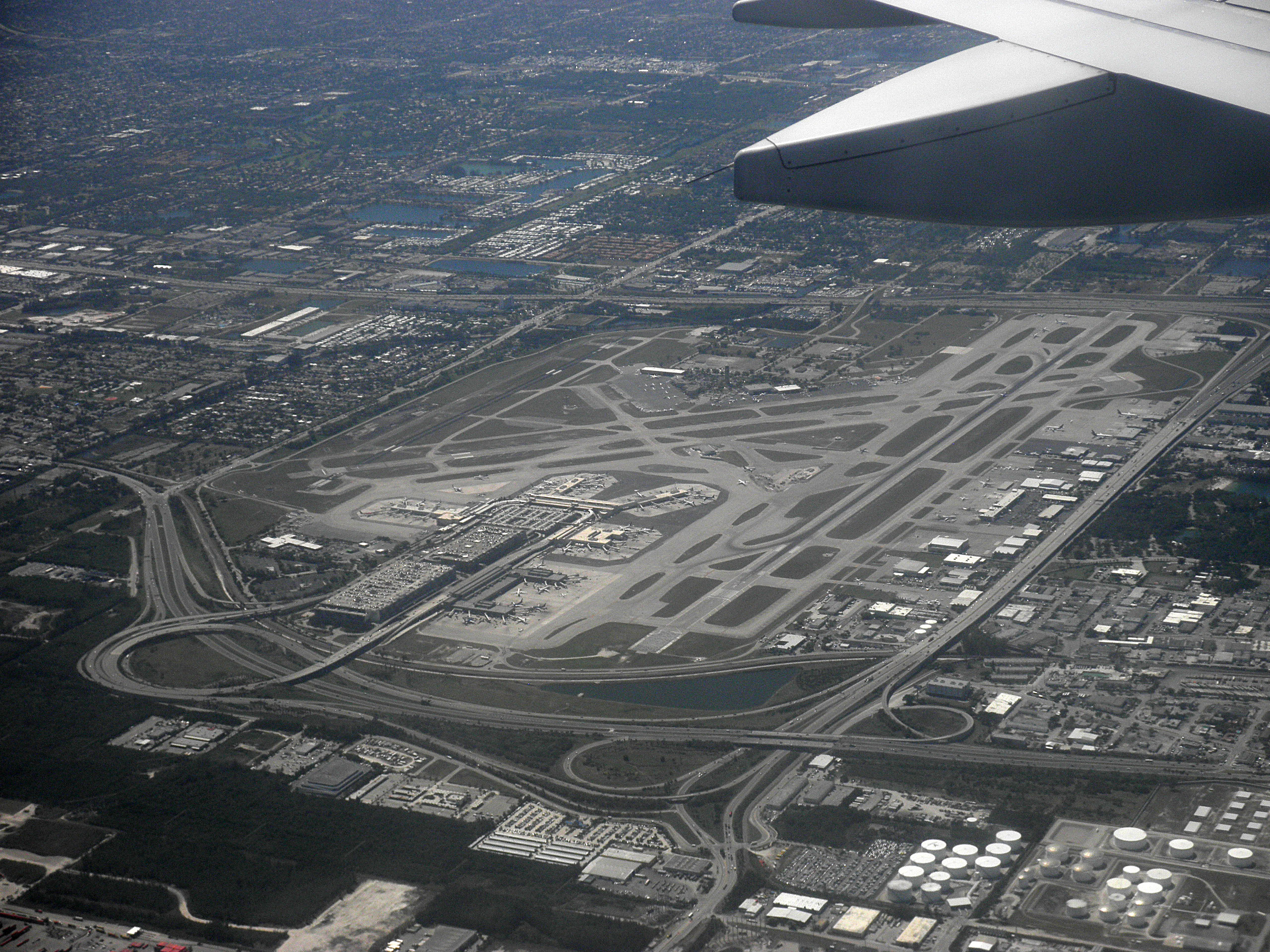
Fort Lauderdale–Hollywood International Airport

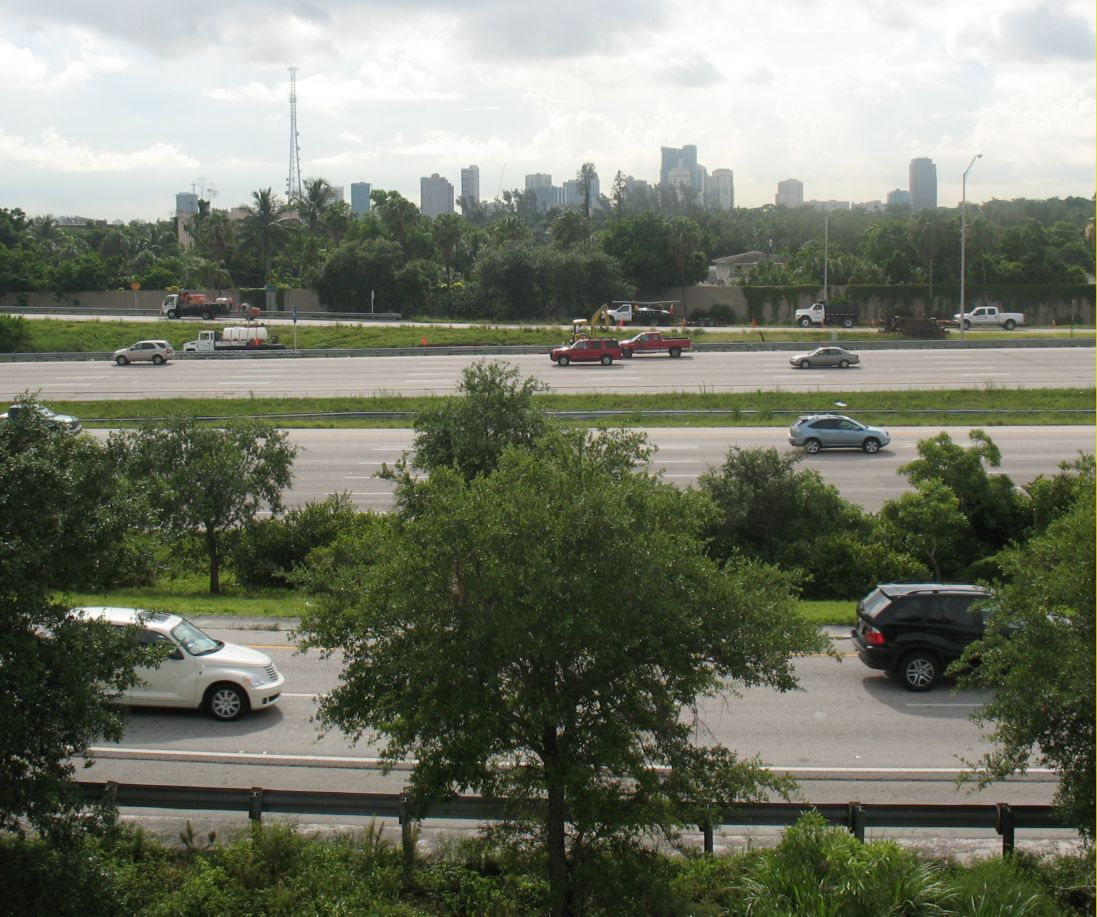
Interstate 95 as it passes through Fort Lauderdale. The city's skyline can be seen in the background.

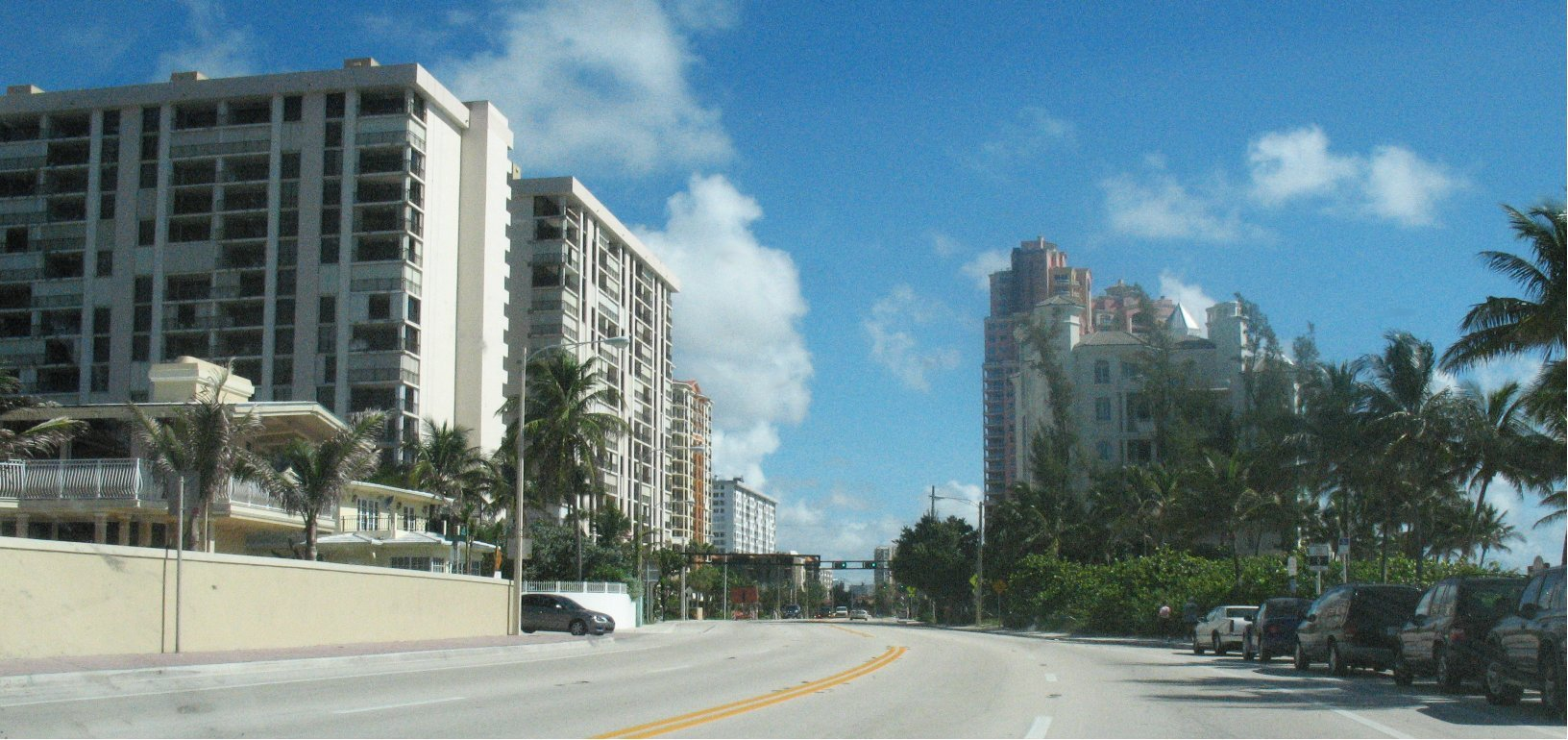
Florida State Road A1A, north of Sunrise Blvd.

Fort Lauderdale–Hollywood International Airport, near Dania Beach, Florida, is the city's main airport and is the fastest-growing major airport in the country as of 2005. This was, in part, attributable to service by low-cost carriers, such as Spirit Airlines, JetBlue Airways, Southwest Airlines, and Silver Airways, resulting in lower airfares than nearby Miami International Airport.

Fort Lauderdale-Hollywood is an emerging international gateway for the Caribbean and Latin America. Miami International Airport and President Donald J. Trump International Airport also serve the city.

=== Waterways ===
Fort Lauderdale is home to Port Everglades, the nation's third busiest cruise port. It is Florida's deepest port, and is an integral petroleum receiving point. Fort Lauderdale is served by a regular international passenger ferry service to Freeport, Grand Bahama Island, Bahamas operated by Baleària Caribbean.

=== Roads ===
Broward County is served by three major interstate highways (I-75, I-95, I-595) and U.S. Highways, such as US 1, US 27 and US 441. The interchange between I-95 and I-595/SR 862 is known as the Rainbow Interchange. It is also served by Florida's Turnpike and State Road 869, also known as the Sawgrass Expressway.

== Healthcare ==
Fort Lauderdale is served by Broward General Medical Center and Imperial Point Medical Center, which are operated by Broward Health, the third-largest hospital consortium in the United States. Broward General is a 716-bed acute care facility that is designated as a Level I trauma center. It is also home to Chris Evert Children's Hospital and a Heart Center of Excellence. The hospital serves as a major training site for medical students from Nova Southeastern University's College of Osteopathic Medicine, as well as nursing and paramedic programs from throughout the area.

Imperial Point Medical Center is a 204-bed facility with a hyperbaric medicine program. Holy Cross Hospital, a 571-bed hospital operated by the Sisters of Mercy, was named by HealthGrades as one of the 50 best hospitals in the country for 2007.

== Sister cities ==
Fort Lauderdale's sister cities are:

- Agogo, Ghana
- Belo Horizonte, Brazil
- Cap-Haïtien, Haiti
- Duisburg, Germany
- Gold Coast, Australia
- Haifa, Israel
- Kaohsiung, Taiwan
- Mar del Plata, Argentina
- Margarita Island, Venezuela
- Mataró, Spain
- Medellín, Colombia
- Muğla, Turkey
- Panama City, Panama
- Quepos, Costa Rica
- Rimini, Italy
- La Romana, Dominican Republic
- São Sebastião, Brazil
- Thessaloniki, Greece
- Venice, Italy

== See also ==
- List of people from Fort Lauderdale, Florida
- List of sister cities of Fort Lauderdale, Florida
- List of tallest buildings in Fort Lauderdale
