= Dr. Willard Van Orsdel King House =

- U.S. National Register of Historic Places
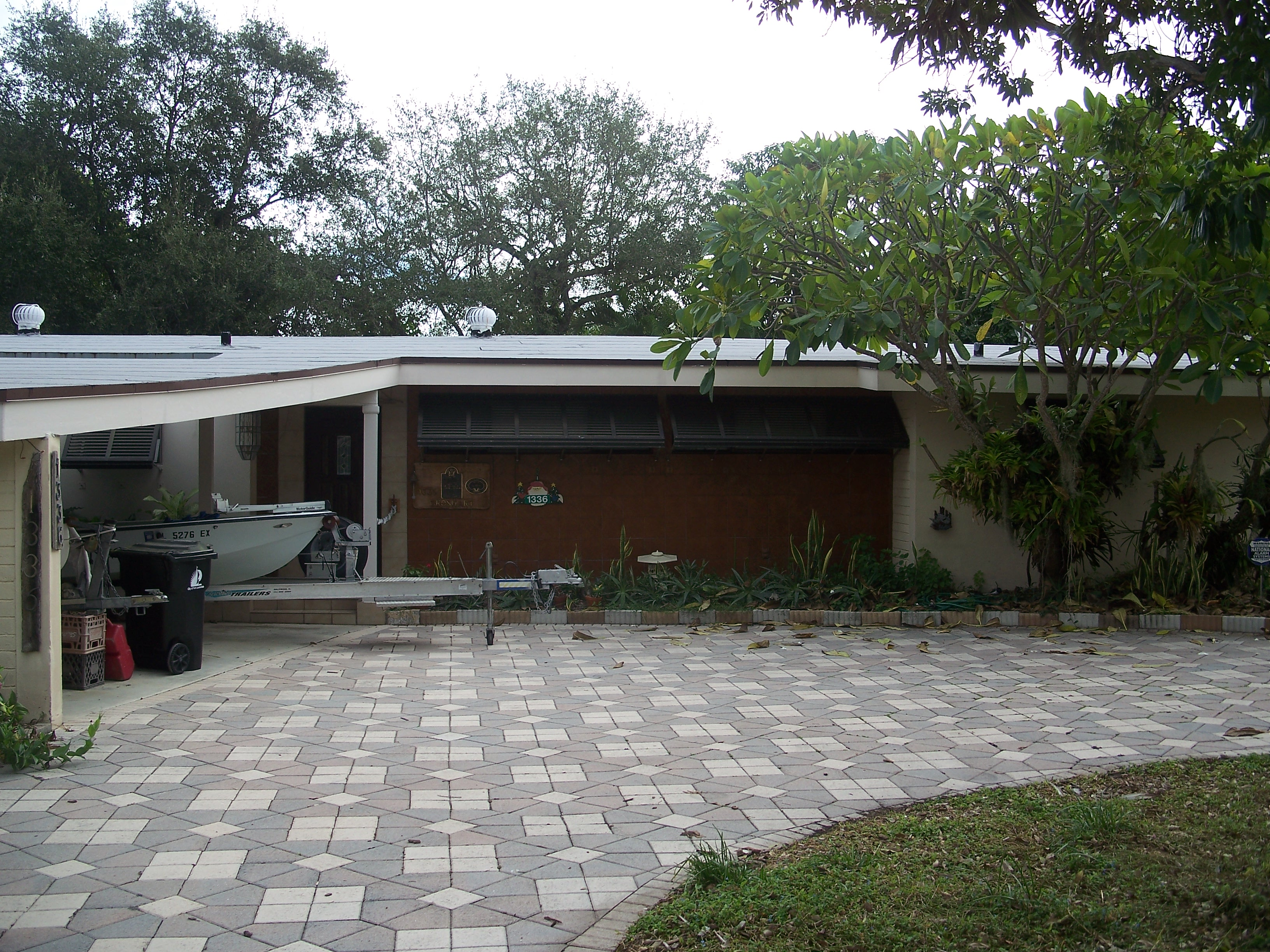

- Location within Florida Location within the United States
- Location: Fort Lauderdale, Florida
- Coordinates: 26°6′18″N 80°6′31″W
- Built: 1951
- Built by: Alan Morton
- Architect: William F. Bigoney Jr.
- Architectural style: Mid-century modern
- NRHP reference No.: 06000059
- Added to NRHP: 21 February 2006

The Dr. Willard Van Orsdel King House is an historic U.S. home in Fort Lauderdale, Florida. It is located at 1336 Seabreeze Boulevard. It was built in 1951 and is an architectural example of the Mid-century modern design movement. On February 21, 2006, it was added to the U.S. National Register of Historic Places.

The three bedroom home was designed by William F. Bigoney to be bright but cool in the subtropic environment. A large central room with two walls of windows is the central axis of the building. It was built in the beginning of the post war development boom in Fort Lauderdale. Entomologist Willard Van Orsdel King who worked in mosquito control lived in the home.

== Building ==
The building is solid concrete block with an irregular floor plan resting on a poured concrete slab. A crescent shaped driveway leads to the front (west) of the building. This view is dominated by a trapezoidal car port (2 car). The north and south elevations are fronted by patios with doors leading into a central room. The house has approximately 2,000 square feet of living space. The attached carport at the northwest end is 658 square feet. The roof is flat over the central "Florida room" and low pitched at the front and back. There are a variety of window forms including window walls, horizontal sliding windows and clerestory windows. The three bedroom home has two and a half baths, a kitchen a combination living/dining room and a Florida room.

The south elevation presents two sections of stucco over concrete block with a section of four sliding glass doors between them. The east wall of the living room has a sliding glass doors leading to the southern exterior patio another set of sliding glass doors just to the south on that wall lead to the master bedroom. These doors are also used on the north and south of the Florida room.

=== Interior ===
The front (west) door leads to a small redwood and rosewood paneled hallway opening to the living/dining room which then, is not separated from the sunken Florida room by a wall. The ceiling of the living/dining room is high pitched, pine, with exposed beams. The Florida room's is low, flat and pine. This central room has sliding glass doors along the full length of its north and south walls.

The Florida room is central to the house with access to the front and rear exterior patios, two of the bedrooms and across much of the length of the living/dining room. Two pods join the Florida room from the east and west. The kitchen is on the north end of the west pod while the master bedroom and bath are to the south. The east pod consists of two bedrooms with a shared bathroom between them. Another half bath is between the kitchen and carport.

The two bedrooms and bath to the east of the central room have high pitched, plastered ceilings. Original features of these bedrooms that remain include clerestory windows, louvered sliding closet doors and tiled window sills. The shared bathroom retains its pocket doors, cabinets, tile and colored fixtures. To the south of the living room, the bathroom for the master bedroom also still has its original pocket door, tile and colored fixtures. North of the dining room the kitchen has original cabinets and wall tile.

=== Alterations ===
The south half of Florida room ceiling was originally glass. In 1964 Hurricane Cleo damaged the glass panels and they were removed and replaced with solid wood, matching the rest of the ceiling. In about 1974 the sliding glass doors on the north and south of the Florida were installed as replacements for the fixed glass and jalousie windows. Salt air had corroded the jalousies so they were stuck. The terrazzo flooring has been covered over with ceramic tiles and in the master bedroom teak parquet tiles. The metal awning windows were replaced with new ones of the same size keeping the look the same in about 1989. Wall unit air conditioners were put in the bedrooms in the 1960s. A swimming pool was built in the south patio in 1986 and is not contributory to the home as historic.

=== Setting ===
The property is located in the Harbor Beach neighborhood where construction began in the early 1950s. It was one of the early houses built in the subdivision which was developed by L.C. Judd. Arriving in Fort Lauderdale in 1937 Judd was to become one of the counties most successful real estate investors. His development work includes much of the single family beachfront properties in Fort Lauderdale and the development of Plantation from flood prone farm land. The City of Fort Lauderdale was going to honor Judd, who had died in 1985, as a founder in 2005 but decided not to after allegations of racism and antisemitism were made.

Fort Lauderdale developed slowly after the 1926 hurricane and the collapse of the Florida land boom of the 1920s. Judd played a notable role in the post World War II return of substantial and sustained development. Harbor Beach was an early success with all 73 lots selling within a year at a starting price of $5,500. The acquisition of the land, legal arrangements and paper work was handled by George English. Most residential development in the 1940s and 1950s in the area were minimal traditional or ranch style homes without much in the way of unique individual design. The King House is an example of Mid-century modern architecture, designed by William F. Bigoney Jr.

== William F. Bigoney Jr. ==
The King House is one of the few remaining buildings designed by pioneering Fort Lauderdale architect William Francis Bigoney Jr. (1921-1996). Bigoney studied under Walter Gropius, founder of the bauhaus design school. Bigoney is one of Fort Lauderdale's most notable modernist architects. In 2000 the city named him an "Honored Founder". The Fort Lauderdale Police Station was designed by Bigoney as well as 233 waterfront homes. He was a civic leader in the city playing a key role in the creation of the Riverwalk project.

His home designs made use of the ocean breezes, foliage and placement to mitigate the heat and sun. The King House exemplifies this with the Florida rooms two full walls of windows and north–south orientation. The house makes extensive use of natural lighting but avoids admitting the direct sunlight. The home reflects the architect's style and retains a high degree of integrity of design and materials.

== Williard Van Orsdel King ==
Willard Van Orsdel King (1888-1970) was an entomologist who made significant and substantial contributions in the research of mosquitoes in the southeast United States, their life cycle and control. King lived in the house from 1953 until he died in the home on March 21, 1970. It is the building most closely associated with King.

Starting in 1917 King worked with Leland Ossian Howard at a field laboratory the latter established in Mound, Louisiana. He worked for the United States Bureau of Entomlology there for the next 13 years. An important aspect of King's work was that although his field was entomology he published in medical journals, so his research results would reach medical scientists. King found that particular species of mosquitoes were efficient hosts for the parasite that causes malaria. His work guided malaria control efforts in the southeast United States. This included a mosquito surveillance and control program for military camps during World War II.

King was the first person to use aerial spraying for mosquito control. One of his most important publications was Mosquitoes of the Southeastern States in 1939. King continued to make important contributions to the field up to the 1950s, identifying over fifty new species of mosquito in New Guinea with Harry Hoogstrael, leading the 1946 establishment of a United States Department of Agriculture laboratory in Orlando to study insects affecting man and animals. In 1954 the first handbook summarizing the evaluation of 12,000 compounds as insecticides and repellents, which he prepared, was published.

In Orlando, Florida, King was director of the mosquito control activities of the United States Bureau of Entomology. He moved there in 1930 and by 1931 it was the headquarters for the mosquito control work of the bureau. In the early 1940s he made several surveys of Fort Lauderdale and was a consultant for the Florida Department of Health. King's work contributed to the progress of Florida by helping combat diseases spread by insects. Commissioned a colonel in the US Army Sanitary Corps in 1941, he served in the South Pacific until 1946 when he returned to Orlando. The US Army awarded King a certificate of merit for his service noting his development and implementation of plans for surveillance of mosquitoes, his efforts resulting in a reduced level of malaria which was causing considerable hospitalization among combat personnel. It also stated he refused evacuation despite hospitalization for serious illness, remaining to serve with distinction.

Retiring in 1953 he moved to Fort Lauderdale and into the Dr. Willard Van Ordel King House. He continued to consult for the United States Bureau of Entomology on mosquito control. After living in the house for 17 years he died there on March 21, 1970.
