= List of tallest buildings in Fort Lauderdale =

Skyline of Fort Lauderdale
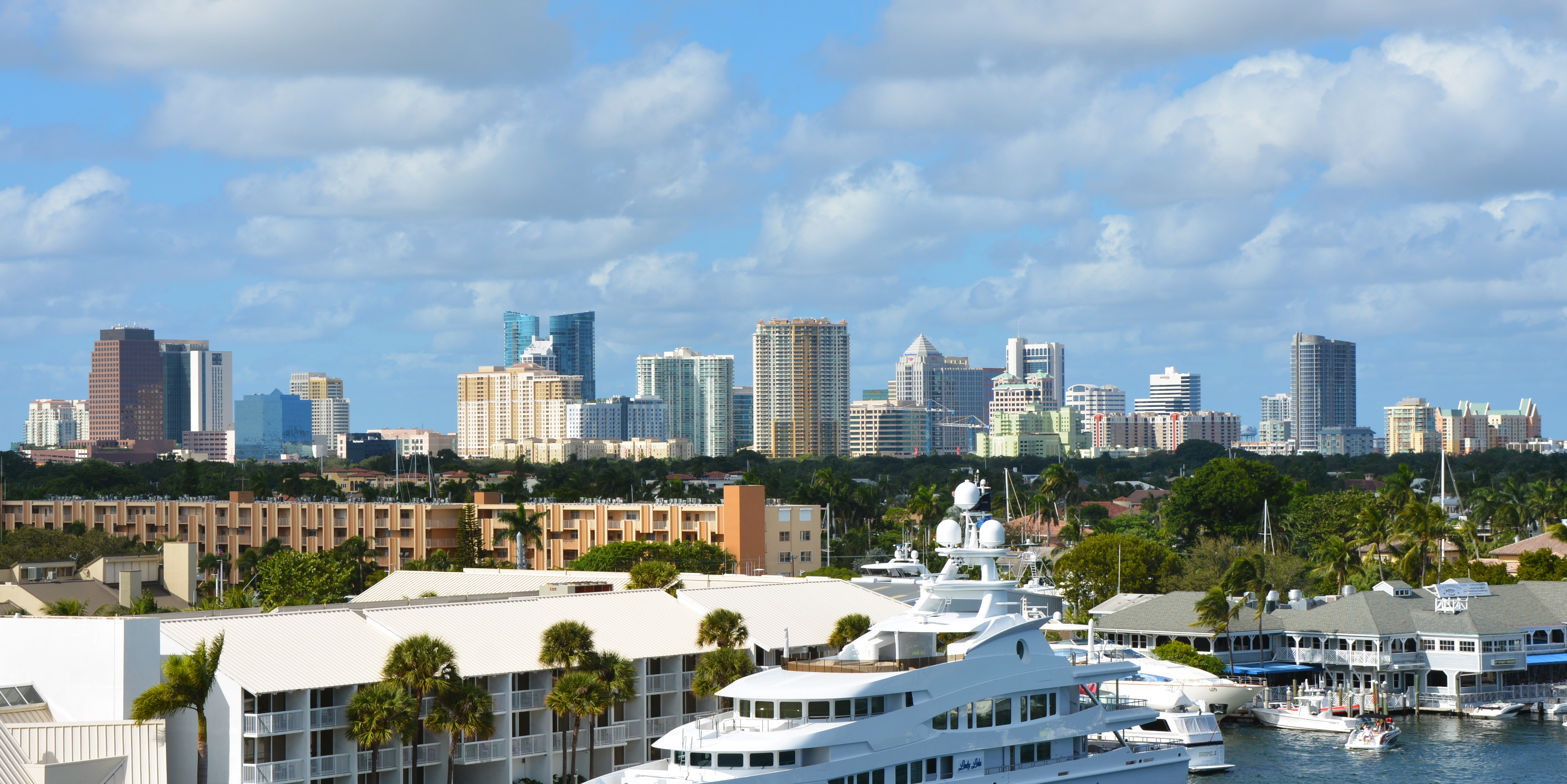
- Fort Lauderdale in 2015
- Tallest building: Veneto Las Olas (2023)
- Tallest building height: 499 ft (152.1 m)

Number of tall buildings (2026)
- Taller than 100 m (328 ft): 22
- Taller than 150 m (492 ft): 3

Number of tall buildings — feet
- Taller than 300 ft (91.4 m): 31

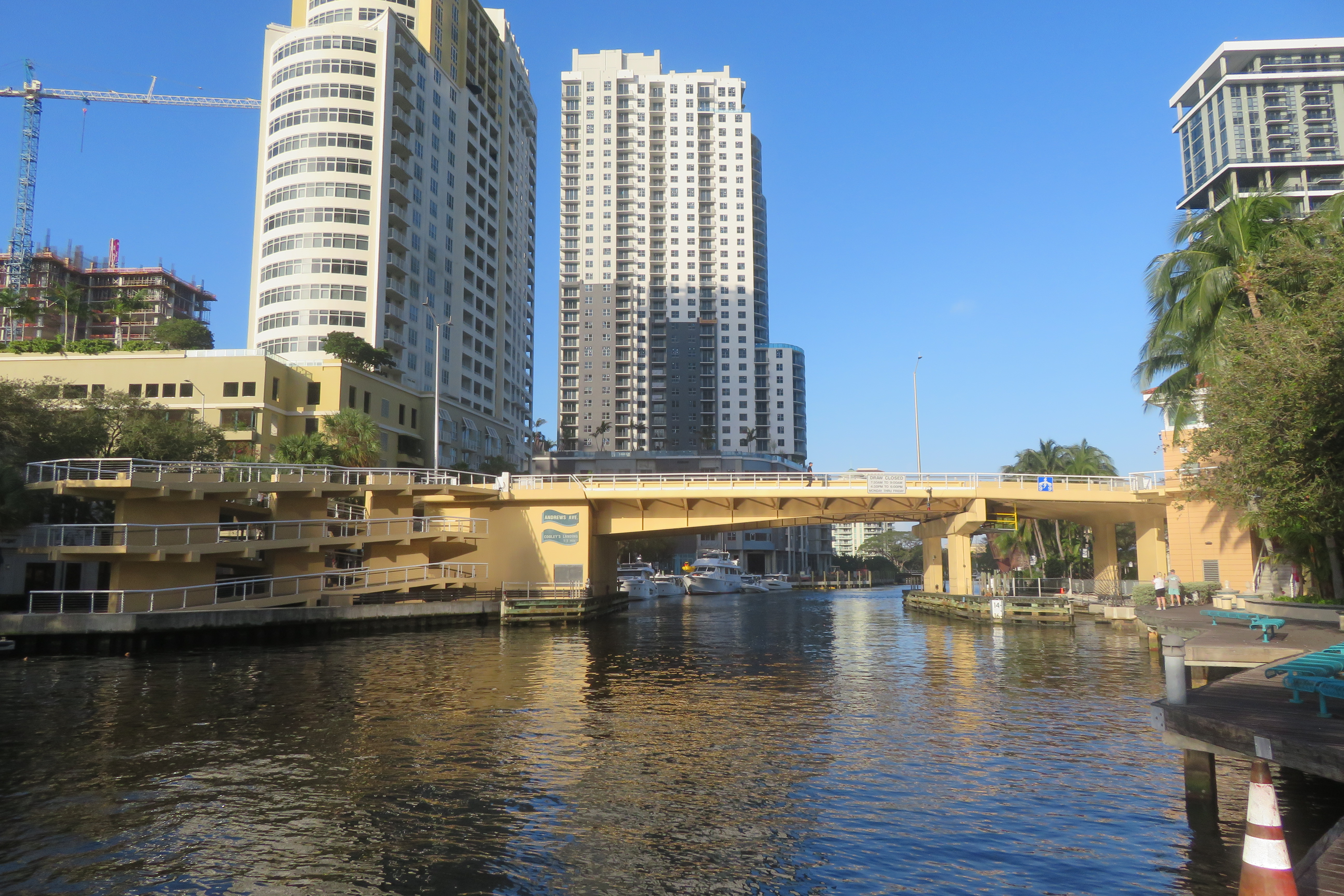
Residential towers along the New River in 2024

Fort Lauderdale is a city in South Florida. With a population of 182,760 as of 2020, it is the third largest city in the Miami metropolitan area. Fort Lauderdale is the site of over 170 high-rises. The city has 30 buildings that stand taller than 300 feet (91 m) as of 2026, the third most of any city in Florida after Miami and Sunny Isles Beach, and ahead of Tampa and Orlando. Three skyscrapers reach a height of 492 ft (150 m), all completed in the 2020s. The tallest building in Fort Lauderdale is Veneto Las Olas, a 499 ft (152 m), 45-story residential tower built in 2023.

The first high-rises in Fort Lauderdale appeared in the 1950s and 1960s as the population of the city grew rapidly, and were mainly built along the coast. In 1973, One Financial Plaza was constructed in Downtown Fort Lauderdale, becoming the city's tallest building at a height of 375 feet (114 m). It was surpassed by 110 Tower, notable for its brown granite exterior, in 1988. Other commercial high-rises built in the late 20th century include Broward Financial Centre in 1985 and PNC Center in 1991.

A construction boom took place in the 2000s with residential towers reaching greater heights. Las Olas River House, a residential skyscraper consisting of three adjoining buildings, was completed in 2004. With a height of 452 ft (138 m), it supplanted 110 Tower as Fort Lauderdale's tallest building. A larger high-rise development boom has been ongoing since the 2010s, reshaping the city's skyline. The boom is concurrent with a skyscraper boom in Miami and the rest of its metropolitan area. The title of Fort Lauderdale's tallest building has changed three times since the mid-2010s, first to Icon Las Olas in 2017, then 100 Las Olas in 2020, and finally to Veneto Las Olas in 2023. Andare Residences, currently under construction, will be the first building to exceed 500 ft (152 m) in the city upon its expected completion in 2027.

Due to the construction booms of the early 21st century, Fort Lauderdale's skyline is primarily composed of residential buildings. Most of the high-rises in Fort Lauderdale are located either in downtown or on the city's coast along the Atlantic Ocean. Several of the tallest buildings are situated near and named after Las Olas Boulevard. The New River runs through downtown, and high-rises can be found on both sides of the tidal estuary.

== History ==
Number of buildings by height in Fort Lauderdale by the end of each year, based on the information in this article. Click on the legend to toggle a specific height on or off. View chart definition.

== Map of tallest buildings ==
The map below shows the location of buildings taller than 300 ft (61 m) in Fort Lauderdale, most of which are located in the city's downtown. Each marker is numbered by the building's height rank, and colored by the decade of its completion.

Buildings taller than 300 ft (91 m) in Fort Lauderdale. An asterisk (*) next to the building's name indicates it is located outside the map.
- 1970s
- 1980s
- 1990s
- 2000s
- 2010s
- 2020s
1 Veneto Las Olas
2 100 Las Olas
3 Gables Riverwalk
4 Alluvion Las Olas
5 Icon Las Olas
6 Las Olas River House
7 Society Las Olas Phase 2
8 Harbour at New River
9 110 Tower
10 Bank of America Plaza
11 Las Olas Grand
12 Hanover Riverwalk
13 Society Las Olas Phase 1
14 One Financial Plaza
15 Amaray Las Olas
16 350 Las Olas Place
17 Broward County Courthouse
18 The Rise at Flagler Village
19 The Palms 2*
20 The Palms 1*
21 201 East Las Olas Boulevard
22 RIVR Lofts
23 Selene Oceanfront Residences West Tower*
24 The WaterGarden
25 Broward Financial Centre
26 Selene Oceanfront Residences East Tower*
27 Jackson Tower*
28 NOVO Las Olas
29 New River Yacht Club I
30 Coral Ridge Presbyterian Church*
31 PNC Center

== Tallest buildings ==
This list ranks completed buildings in Fort Lauderdale that stand at least 300 ft (91 m) tall as of 2026, based on standard height measurement. This includes spires and architectural details but does not include antenna masts. The “Year” column indicates the year of completion. Buildings tied in height are sorted by year of completion with earlier buildings ranked first, and then alphabetically.

Was the tallest building in Fort Lauderdale upon completion

Rank	Name	Image	Location	Height ft (m)	Floors	Year	Purpose	Notes
1	Veneto Las Olas	—	26°07′13″N 80°08′15″W	499 (152.1)	45	2023	Residential	Tallest building in Fort Lauderdale since 2023. Tallest building completed in Fort Lauderdale in the 2020s. Known as RD Las Olas before completion.
2	100 Las Olas	—	26°07′08″N 80°08′31″W	495 (150.9)	46	2020	Mixed-use	Tallest building in Fort Lauderdale from 2020 to 2023. Mixed-use residential and hotel building.
3	Gables Riverwalk	—	26°07′04″N 80°08′24″W	493 (150.3)	43	2025	Residential	
4	Alluvion Las Olas	—	26°07′04″N 80°08′27″W	480 (146.3)	43	2020	Residential	
5	Icon Las Olas		26°07′07″N 80°08′16″W	455 (138.7)	45	2017	Residential	Tallest building in Fort Lauderdale from 2017 to 2020. Tallest building completed in Fort Lauderdale in the 2010s.
6	Las Olas River House		26°07′05″N 80°08′30″W	452 (137.8)	42	2004	Residential	Tallest building in Fort Lauderdale from 2004 to 2017. Tallest building completed in Fort Lauderdale in the 2000s.
7	Society Las Olas Phase 2	—	26°07′12″N 80°08′43″W	450 (137.2)	42	2026	Residential	
8	Harbour at New River	—	26°07′04″N 80°08′42″W	422 (128.5)	36	2024	Residential	
9	110 Tower		26°06′52″N 80°08′30″W	410 (125)	30	1988	Office	Tallest building in Fort Lauderdale from 1988 to 2004. Formerly known as AutoNation Tower. Tallest building completed in Fort Lauderdale in the 1980s.
10	Bank of America Plaza		26°07′11″N 80°08′20″W	408 (124.4)	23	2002	Office	
11	Las Olas Grand	—	26°07′05″N 80°08′19″W	397 (121)	38	2005	Residential	
12	Hanover Riverwalk	—	26°06′59″N 80°08′41″W	394 (120)	36	2026	Residential	
13	Society Las Olas Phase 1	—	26°07′10″N 80°08′41″W	376 (114.6)	34	2020	Residential	
14	One Financial Plaza	One Financial Plaza, October 2005, after Wilma	26°07′17″N 80°08′23″W	375 (114.3)	28	1973	Office	Tallest building in Fort Lauderdale from 1973 to 1988. Tallest building completed in Fort Lauderdale in the 1970s.
15	Amaray Las Olas	—	26°07′13″N 80°08′09″W	369 (112.5)	29	2016	Residential	Also known as 8th Avenue Residences.
16	350 Las Olas Place	—	26°07′13″N 80°08′23″W	362 (110.2)	30	2005	Residential	
17	Broward County Courthouse	—	26°06′55″N 80°08′33″W	354 (108)	20	2015	Government	
18	The Rise at Flagler Village	—	26°07′28″N 80°08′21″W	352 (107.3)	30	2020	Residential	
19	The Palms 2	—	26°09′22″N 80°06′02″W	345 (105.2)	32	1999	Residential	
20	The Palms 1	—	26°09′20″N 80°06′03″W	342 (104.2)	30	2001	Residential	
21	201 East Las Olas Boulevard	—	26°07′10″N 80°08′27″W	340 (104) (Note: Sources do not state the exact height of this building. This figure was determined using Google Earth by subtracting the altitude of the building's lowest main pedestrian open-air entrance from its highest architectural point.)	23	2020	Office	Part of The Main Las Olas development.
22	RIVR Lofts	—	26°07′00″N 80°08′48″W	329 (100.4)	30	2025	Residential	
23	Selene Oceanfront Residences West Tower	—	26°07′28″N 80°06′19″W	326 (99.5)	26	2025	Residential	
24	The WaterGarden		26°07′04″N 80°08′22″W	325 (99)	31	2004	Residential	
25	Broward Financial Centre		26°07′19″N 80°08′19″W	324 (98.8)	24	1985	Office	
26	Selene Oceanfront Residences East Tower	—	26°07′29″N 80°06′17″W	320 (97.4)	26	2025	Residential	
27	Jackson Tower	—	26°07′16″N 80°06′23″W	315 (96)	30	2001	Residential	
28	NOVO Las Olas	—	26°07′13″N 80°08′27″W	314 (96)	26	2020	Residential	Also known as 212 SE Second Avenue. Part of The Main Las Olas development.
29	New River Yacht Club I	—	26°07′03″N 80°08′38″W	313 (95.5)	26	2014	Residential	
30	Coral Ridge Presbyterian Church		26°11′45″N 80°06′45″W	303 (92.4)	N/A	1973	Religious	Tallest religious building in Fort Lauderdale.
31	PNC Center		26°07′19″N 80°08′27″W	300 (91.4)	23	1991	Office	Formerly known as First Union Center and Wachovia Center.

== Tallest under construction or proposed ==
=== Under construction ===
The following table includes buildings under construction in Fort Lauderdale that are planned to be at least 300 ft (91 m) tall as of 2026, based on standard height measurement. The “Year” column indicates the expected year of completion. Buildings that are on hold are not included.

Name	Height ft (m)	Floors	Year	Purpose	Notes
Andare Residences	540 (165)	46	2027	Residential	Will become the tallest building in Fort Lauderdale upon completion.
Ombelle (Tower 1)	525 (160)	43	2028	Residential	
Ombelle (Tower 2)	525 (160)	43	2028	Residential	

=== Proposed ===
The following table includes approved and proposed buildings in Fort Lauderdale as of 2026. Due to the number of proposed buildings, a height cutoff of 492 ft (150 m) is used. The “Year” column indicates the expected year of completion. A dash “–“ indicates information about the building’s height, floor count, or year of completion is unknown or has not been released. This list may not be exhaustive.

Name	Height ft (m)	Floors	Purpose	Notes
633 Southeast 3rd Avenue	605 (184)	47	Residential	Proposed in 2022.
Nautica Hotel and Residences (Tower 1)	595 (181)	50	Residential	Proposed in 2022.
200 West Broward Boulevard	579 (176)	48	Mixed-use	Proposed in 2022.
300 West Broward Boulevard	558 (170)	—	Mixed-use	Its design will include a circa 20-story hole in the building allowing light and air to pass through.
101 Southeast 7th Street	557 (170)	45	Mixed-use	Its design features alternating portions of stacked balconies with half-cylinders of glass forming the outer edges of rooms on the exterior on all four elevations. Proposed in 2022.
DNA Towers	550 (168)	45	Mixed-use	Two joined towers. The height figure is for the taller tower. Proposed in 2022.
201 North Federal Highway (Tower 1)	509 (155)	47	Mixed-use	
Viceroy Residences Fort Lauderdale	500 (152)	45	Residential	
317 North Federal Highway (Tower 1)	500 (152)	45	Residential	
11 Andrews	499 (152)	47	Residential	
109 Northeast 2nd Street	495 (151)	48	Residential	
201 North Federal Highway (Tower 2)	493 (150)	45	Mixed-use	

== Timeline of tallest buildings ==
This lists buildings that once held the title of the tallest building in Fort Lauderdale.

Name	Image	Years as tallest	Height ft (m)	Floors	References
One Financial Plaza	One Financial Plaza, October 2005, after Wilma	1973–1988	375 (144)	28	
110 Tower		1988–2004	410 (125)	30	
Las Olas River House		2004–2017	452 (138)	45	
Icon Las Olas		2017–2020	455 (139)	45	
100 Las Olas	—	2020–2023	495 (151)	46	
Veneto Las Olas	—	2023–present	499 (152)	45	

== See also ==
- List of tallest buildings in Florida
- List of tallest buildings in Jacksonville
- List of tallest buildings in Miami
- List of tallest buildings in Miami Beach
- List of tallest buildings in Orlando
- List of tallest buildings in St. Petersburg
- List of tallest buildings in Sunny Isles Beach
- List of tallest buildings in Tampa
- List of tallest buildings in Tallahassee
