= PNC =

PNC may refer to:

== Government and politics ==
- Congolese National Police, in French: Police nationale congolaise
- Colombian National Police, in Spanish: Policía Nacional de Colombia
- National Civil Police of El Salvador, in Spanish: Policía Nacional Civil
- Palestinian National Council, the legislative body of the Palestine Liberation Organization
- Partitu di a Nazione Corsa (Party of the Corsican Nation), a nationalist political party in Corsica
- People's National Congress (Guyana), a socialist political party in Guyana
- People's National Congress (Maldives), a right-wing party in the Maldives
- Police National Computer in the United Kingdom

== Companies and organizations ==
- PNC Financial Services, a Fortune 500 company
- PNC Process Systems, Chinese semiconductor company
- Pacific Northwest Conference, an intercollegiate athletic conference from 1926 to 1984
- Philippine National Construction Corporation (stock symbol PNC)
- Purdue University North Central, a former branch of Purdue University in Westville, Indiana, now a campus of Purdue University Northwest
- Prince Aviation, ICAO airline code
- Pakistan Nursing Council

== Other ==
- Pacific Northwest Corridor, one of eleven federally designated high-speed rail corridors in the U.S.
- Plate number coil, a postage stamp with the number of the printing plate printed on it
- PNC (rapper), New Zealand rapper
- Particle number concentration, also particle number density, term used in thermodynamics related to Particle number
- Post-nut clarity

== See also ==
- PNC Center (disambiguation)
- P&C (disambiguation)
