= One Financial Plaza (Fort Lauderdale) =

- Interactive map of the One Financial Plaza area

General information
- Status: Completed
- Type: Office
- Location: 100 SE 3rd Ave, Fort Lauderdale, Florida, [United States
- Coordinates: 26°07′18″N 080°08′24″W
- Construction started: 1972
- Completed: 1972
- Opening: 1972

Height
- Roof: 374 ft (114 m)

Technical details
- Floor count: 28
- Floor area: 291,745 sq ft (27,104.0 m^{2})

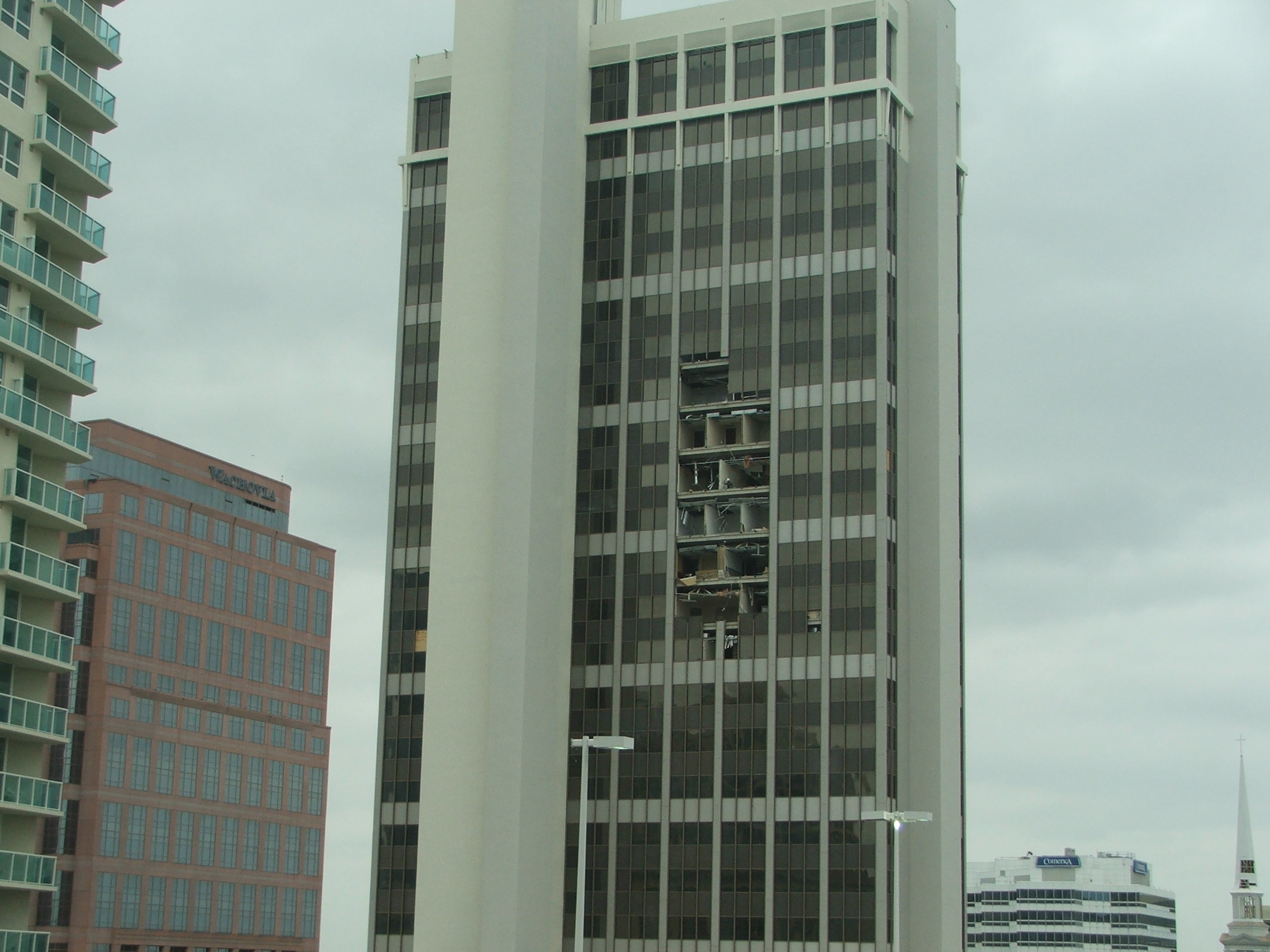
One Financial Plaza

One Financial Plaza is a 374 ft (114 m), 28-story building in downtown Fort Lauderdale, Florida, USA, was opened in 1972. At the time of its opening, it was the tallest building in the Fort Lauderdale area. It has since been surpassed by several buildings.

One Financial Plaza bears a striking resemblance to the Chase Tower in Amarillo, Texas. They were built around the same time (Chase Tower opened in 1971, the year before One Financial Plaza opened) and Chase Tower is only a few floors taller, at 31 stories.

== History ==
When the building was constructed in 1972, it was known as the Landmark Bank Building, after its builder and main tenant, Landmark Bank. Landmark Bank was acquired by C&S in 1985 and, after a series of mergers and acquisitions, became a part of Bank of America. In 2002, Bank of America moved into a nearby building, and Union Planters Bank moved into the building the following year. The name on the building was changed to "Union Planters" and later to "Regions" when Regions Bank merged with Union Planters in 2004.

In 2005, when Hurricane Wilma hit Fort Lauderdale, One Financial Plaza (along with the rest of the city's skyline) suffered some damage, including a large gash that stretched from the 14th to the 19th floors. In 2009, construction was completed to rebuild a storm-grade curtain wall and modernize the facade in accordance with post-Hurricane Andrew building codes.

The renovation to fix the facade after the damage done by Hurricane Wilma was performed by RLC Architects from Boca Raton.

== See also ==
- List of tallest buildings in Fort Lauderdale
