= PNC Center =

PNC Center may refer to:

- PNC Center (Cincinnati), a building in Cincinnati, Ohio
- PNC Center (Cleveland), a building in Cleveland, Ohio, the former headquarters of National City
- PNC Center (Fort Lauderdale), formerly National City Center a building in Fort Lauderdale, Florida
- PNC Center (Fort Wayne), a building in Fort Wayne, Indiana
- Hyatt Regency Indianapolis, a mixed use building in Indianapolis, Indiana also known as the PNC Center
