= FirstBank Southwest Tower =

Building in Texas, US

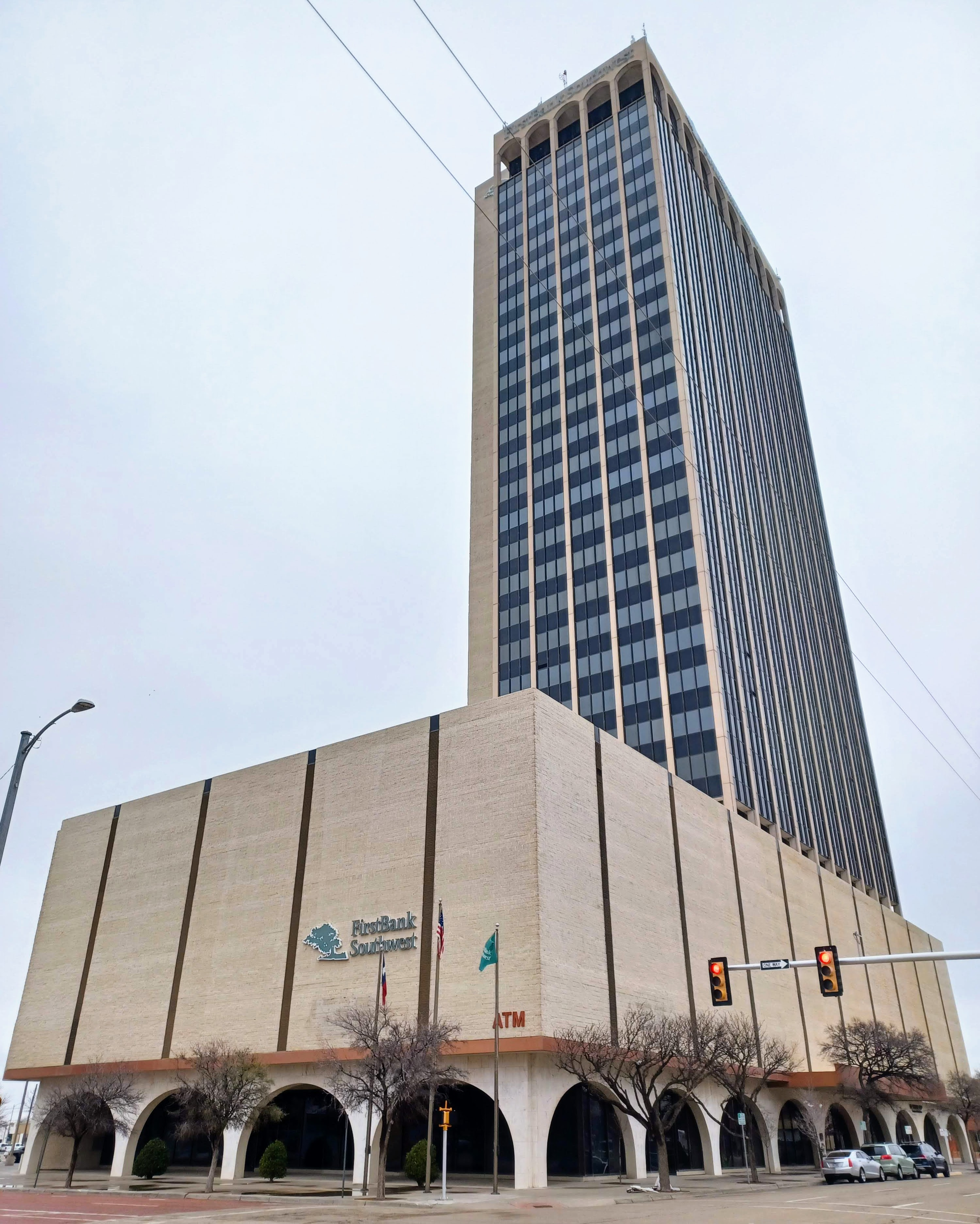
- The FirstBank Southwest Tower in downtown Amarillo.

- Location within Texas Location within the United States
- Former names: SPS Tower; Team Bank building Bank One Center; Chase Tower; Amarillo Tower

General information
- Architectural style: Modernism
- Location: 600 South Tyler Street, Amarillo, Texas, United States
- Coordinates: 35.2073°N 101.8390°W
- Completed: 1971

Height
- Height: 374 ft (114 m)

Technical details
- Floor count: 31
- American National Bank of Amarillo and SPS Tower
- U.S. National Register of Historic Places
- NRHP reference No.: 100003493
- Added to NRHP: March 6, 2019

FirstBank Southwest Tower is a 374-foot (114 m), 31-story building located in Amarillo, Texas, United States. Formerly known as SPS Tower, Bank One Center, Chase Tower, and Amarillo Tower, it is the tallest building in Amarillo and the West Texas region. The building used to be the home of the Amarillo branch of American National Bank. The building also housed the offices of the region's electric power service provider, Southwestern Public Service (which was later acquired by Xcel Energy).

The Tower has a striking resemblance to the One Financial Plaza Building in Fort Lauderdale, Florida. The First Bank Southwest Tower is only about three stories taller than its counterpart.

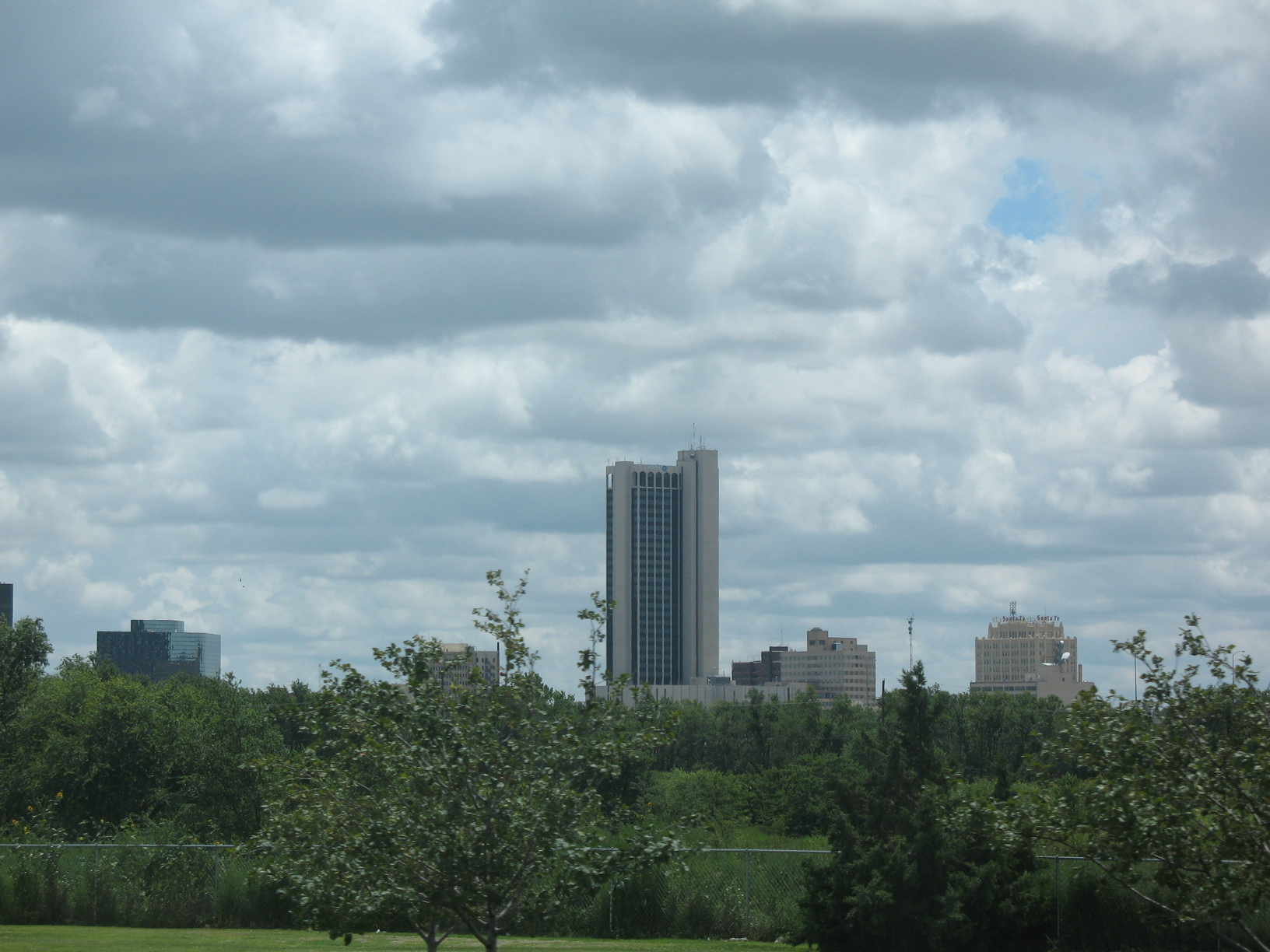
FirstBank Southwest Tower dominates the skyline of downtown Amarillo.

In October 2008, the West Texas A&M University letters were installed on the First Bank Southwest Tower as part of the agreement to have university classes there.

In 2018, Chase decided to close its downtown Amarillo branch in the building. By June 2018, FirstBank Southwest reached an agreement to locate a downtown branch there and receive naming rights on the building in the process. The FDIC approved the application by October 2018, for FirstBank Southwest to have a branch in the building, and the bank plans to be operational there by the middle of 2019. Work began in late March 2019 to place the letters for the logo sign for FirstBank Southwest at the top of the tower in three places. The process was scheduled to take around two weeks' time.

The tower was added to the National Register of Historic Places on March 6, 2019.

== Tenants ==
Tenants at FirstBank Southwest Tower include FirstBank Southwest, Amarillo Globe-News, Cactus Feeders, Tower Fitness, Tower Cafe, and the Amarillo Club, a members-only dining facility.

== See also ==
- List of tallest buildings in Amarillo
