= P&C =

P&C may refer to:

- Parents and citizens associations, Australian state school support bodies
- Peanuts & Corn Records
- Peek & Cloppenburg, a German fashion retailer
- P&C Foods, a food cooperative/supermarket chain, later P&C Fresh
- P&C Stadium, the former name of NBT Bank Stadium, a baseball stadium in Syracuse, New York
- Pepper&Carrot, a libre culture webcomic
- Property and casualty insurance, another name for general insurance
