= Bank of America Plaza (Fort Lauderdale) =

401 Las Olas
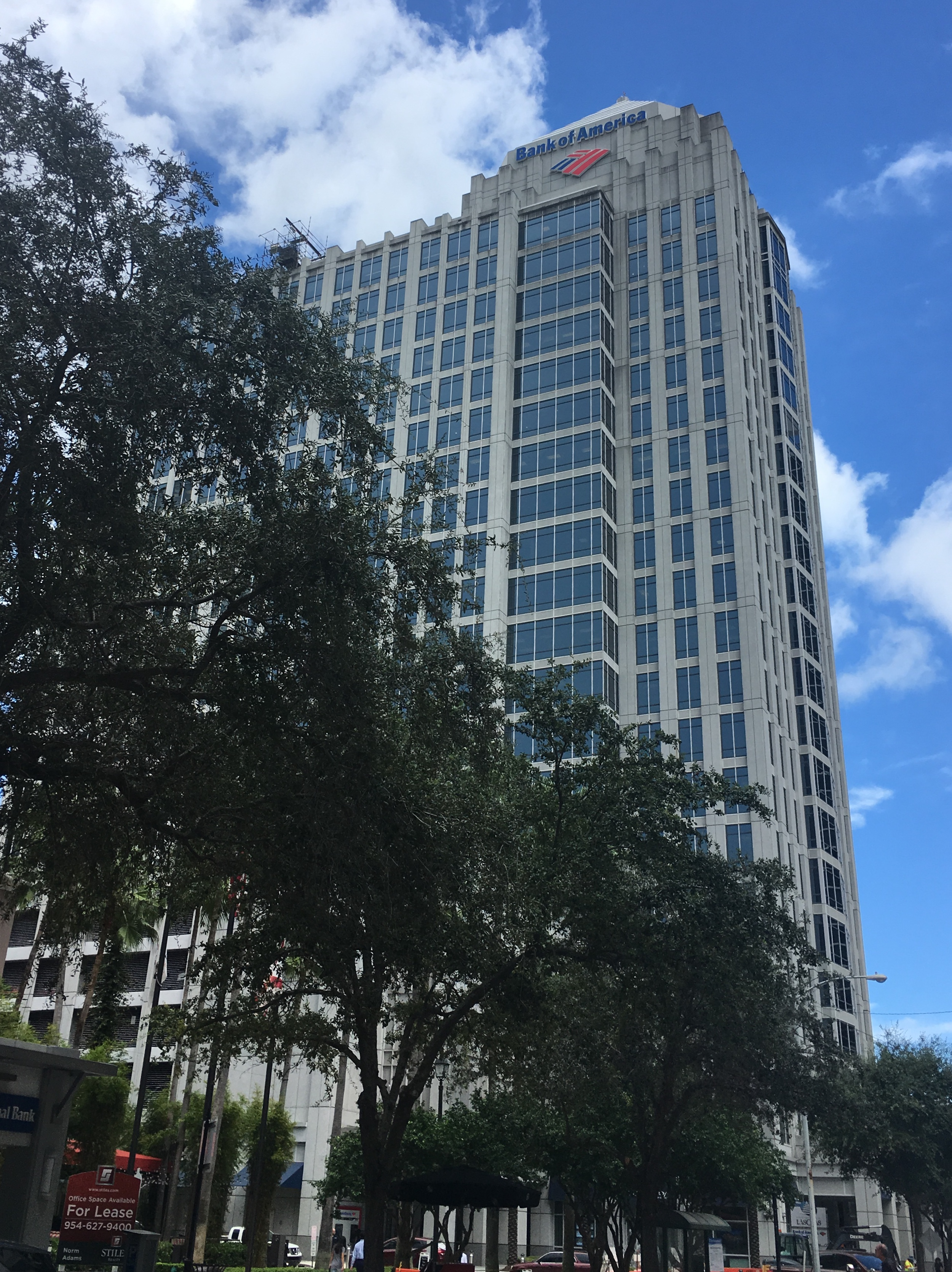
- Interactive map of the 401 Las Olas area
- Alternative names: Bank of America Plaza

General information
- Status: Completed
- Type: Office
- Location: 401 East Las Olas Boulevard Fort Lauderdale, Florida, United States
- Coordinates: 26.119782°N 80.138980°W
- Construction started: 2000
- Completed: 2002
- Opening: 2003

Height
- Antenna spire: 407 ft (124 m)
- Roof: 365 ft (111 m)

Technical details
- Floor count: 23

Design and construction
- Architects: Cooper Carry, Inc.

401 Las Olas (also known as Bank of America Plaza) is a 365 feet (111 m), 23-story office building located at Las Olas City Centre in downtown Fort Lauderdale, Florida. The structure was finished in early 2003, and contains a parking garage which is located on the second to sixth floors, a small retail mall, and a Bank of America—the building's namesake tenant—on the ground floor. It is currently the fifth tallest building in Ft. Lauderdale.

The rest of the building, however, is strictly off-limits to the public, with the exception of employees and company clients. These individuals must maintain an ID card in order to access the building's elevators.

The tower's pyramidal top, which resembles the Miami-Dade County Courthouse's, rises 42 ft, and is the signature portion of the building. It is illuminated at night, which gives it a prominent place in the city's skyline.

== See also ==
- List of tallest buildings in Fort Lauderdale
