= Las Olas River House =

Residential tower in Florida, United States

Coordinates: 26°07′05″N 80°08′30″W

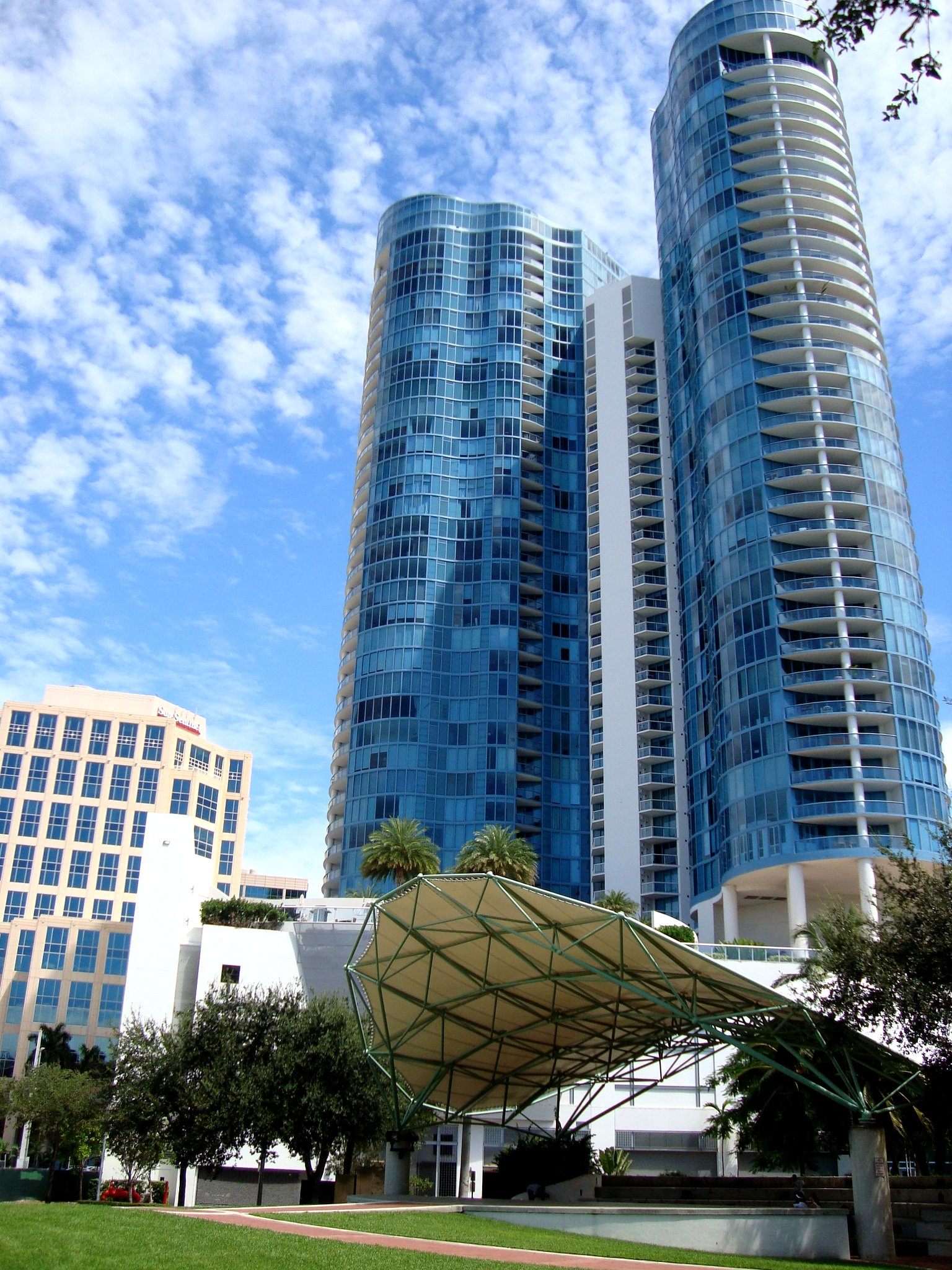
- Interactive map of the Las Olas River House area

General information
- Status: Completed
- Type: Residential
- Location: 333 Las Olas Way 4 Fort Lauderdale, Florida, United States
- Construction started: 2001
- Completed: 2004
- Opening: 2004

Height
- Roof: 452 ft (138 m)

Technical details
- Floor count: 42

Design and construction
- Developer: Tarragon Corporation

Las Olas River House is a 42-story residential skyscraper located in downtown Fort Lauderdale, Florida. It stood as the tallest building in Ft. Lauderdale, until The Icon on Las Olas overtook it in late 2017. The structure is a complex created by three adjoining buildings; two duplicate 42-story towers, and one 34-story tower.

The building has 285 residential units, made up of one, two and three bedroom condominiums, and also includes a 10,000-square-foot (930 m^{2}) glass walled fitness center that overlooks the New River which is only for the exclusive use of residents, and a 60,000-square-foot (5,600 m^{2}) rooftop garden on the sixth floor. Las Olas River House condo includes a sixth-floor cocktail bistro lounge, separate quiet library area, private meeting room, poolside cabanas and a major conference area for meetings and conducting business. Las Olas River House also contains "Smart" building features that allow all its residents to access all the building's amenities at a touch of a button.

The building is part of a highrise boom in the downtown area, along with other condominiums and residential towers such as Las Olas Grand.

== See also ==
- List of tallest buildings in Fort Lauderdale
