= PNC Center (Fort Lauderdale) =

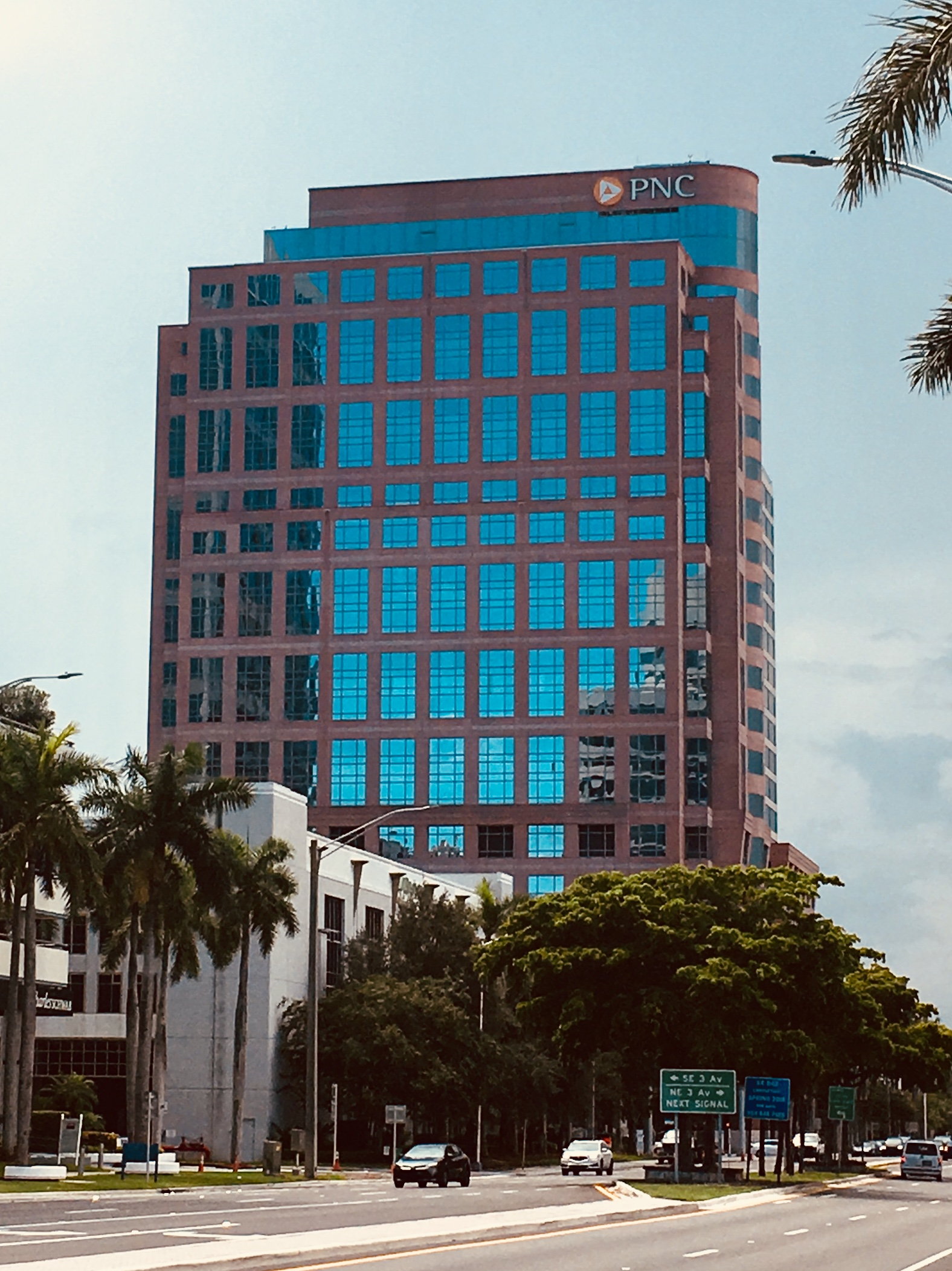

- Location within Florida
- Former names: Fidelity Federal, National City Center

General information
- Status: Completed
- Type: Office
- Location: 200 East Broward Boulevard, Fort Lauderdale, Florida, United States
- Coordinates: 26.1219°N 80.1409°W
- Completed: 1991

Height
- Roof: 300 ft (91 m)

Technical details
- Floor count: 22
- Lifts/elevators: 9 made by Montgomery Elevator

Design and construction
- Architect: RTKL Associates

PNC Center is a high-rise located in downtown Fort Lauderdale, Florida. The building opened in 1991, as First Union Center and later renamed Wachovia Center, after Wachovia became the building's largest tenant.
