= History of Fort Lauderdale, Florida =

The history of Fort Lauderdale, Florida began more than 4,000 years ago with the arrival of the first aboriginal natives, and later with the Tequesta Indians, who inhabited the area for more than a thousand years. Though control of the area changed among Spain, England, the United States, and the Confederate States of America, it remained largely undeveloped until the 20th century. The first settlement in the area was the site of a massacre at the beginning of the Second Seminole War, an event which precipitated the abandonment of the settlement and set back development in the area by over 50 years. The first United States stockade named Fort Lauderdale was built in 1838, and subsequently was a site of fighting during the Second Seminole War. The fort was abandoned in 1842, after the end of the war, and the area remained virtually unpopulated until the 1890s.

The Fort Lauderdale area was known as the "New River Settlement" prior to the 20th century. While a few pioneer families lived in the area since the late 1840s, it was not until the Florida East Coast Railroad built tracks through the area in the mid-1890s that any organized development began. The city was incorporated in 1911, and in 1915 was designated the county seat of newly formed Broward County.

Fort Lauderdale's first major development began in the 1920s, during the Florida land boom of the 1920s. The 1926 Miami Hurricane and the Great Depression of the 1930s caused a great deal of economic dislocation. When World War II began, Fort Lauderdale became a major US Navy base, with a Naval Air Station to train pilots, radar and fire control operator training schools, and a Coast Guard base at Port Everglades. After the war ended, service members returned to the area, spurring an enormous population explosion which dwarfed the 1920s boom. In the 1970s, Ft. Lauderdale beach became a mecca for runaways and a group of approximately 60-150 runaways formed a group called "The Family". Most resorted to petty crimes to support themselves and others. Today, Fort Lauderdale is a major yachting center, one of the nation's biggest tourist destinations, and the center of a metropolitan division of 1.8 million people.

== Prior to 1820 ==
Frankee Lewis lands, New River Settlement

Archaeological evidence indicates that the first natives in the Broward County area arrived approximately 4,000 years ago. At the time of initial European exploration, the area was occupied by the Tequesta tribe of Native Americans. Contact by Spanish explorers beginning in the 16th century proved disastrous for native tribes, including the Tequesta, as the Europeans unwittingly brought with them diseases to which the native populations possessed no resistance, such as smallpox. For the Tequesta, disease, coupled with continuing conflict with their Calusa neighbors, contributed greatly to their decline over the next two centuries. By 1763, there were only a few Tequesta left in Florida, and most of them were evacuated to Cuba when the Spanish ceded Florida to the British in 1763, under the terms of the Treaty of Paris (1763), which ended the Seven Years' War. Bernard Romans reported sighting many abandoned Tequesta villages when he visited the area in the 1770s. Subsequently, Florida returned to Spanish control under the terms of the Treaty of Paris in 1783, which ended the American Revolutionary War.

In the early 18th century, Creek Indians had moved down from Alabama and joined the Oconee, themselves recent immigrants from Georgia; together, they formed the core of the Seminole tribe. Settlements by the English, and later Americans, gradually pushed the Seminoles southward. In 1788, roughly the same time that the Seminoles began to arrive in what was eventually to become Broward County, two families arrived and set up homes along the New River—the Lewis family and the Robbins family, who had arrived in Florida from the Bahamas.

== 1820-1892 ==
Under the terms of the Adams-Onís Treaty, ratified in 1821 between Spain and the United States, Florida was ceded to the United States in exchange for U.S. forfeiture of a $5 million debt owed by Spain. Florida became a U.S. Territory in 1821. By 1830, the de facto leader among the approximately 70 people living at the "New River Settlement" (present day Fort Lauderdale) was William Cooley. Cooley was appointed by Governor William Pope Duval as Justice of the Peace for the region.

In 1835, white settlers killed a Seminole chief named Alibama and burned his hut in a dispute. As Justice of Peace, Cooley jailed the settlers, but they were released after a hearing at the Monroe County Court in Key West; the justification was insufficient evidence. The Seminoles blamed Cooley, saying he withheld evidence. The growing uneasiness between the Seminoles and the whites led to the Seminole migration to the Lake Okeechobee area. On 28 December 1835, a Seminole ambush known as the Dade Massacre started the Second Seminole War.

On 3 January 1836, Cooley led a large shipwrecking expedition from the settlement to free the Gil Blas, a ship that had beached the previous September; the scale of the operation required most of the settlement's able men. The following day, a group of 15 to 20 Seminoles invaded the Cooley house, killed Cooley's wife and children, scalped the children's tutor, and burned the house to the ground. Although the Indians did not attack any other families, the massacre triggered the departure of the white settlers from the area. During the second Seminole War, Major William Lauderdale led his Tennessee Volunteers into the area. In 1838, Lauderdale erected a fort on the New River at the site of the modern city of Fort Lauderdale (where SW 9th Avenue meets SW 4th Court). Lauderdale left after one month, but his name remained. The Seminoles destroyed the fort a few months later. Two more forts were built sequentially, each closer to the ocean. After the end of the Second Seminole War in 1842, the fort was abandoned, and the area remained largely empty, as the remaining Seminoles withdrew to Pine Island (near present-day Hollywood Seminole Indian Reservation), and only a handful of settlers were known to live in all of what eventually became Broward County. While the area was technically a part of the Confederacy during the US Civil War, the only known white settlers in the area during the war was pro-unionist Isaiah Hall and his family, who had been run out of Miami by pro-confederacy sympathizers in 1863, and settled on the New River.

As there was no overland route into or out of the area, no significant settlement was undertaken until the 1890s. In 1892, however, the first road through the county was built, when a road was constructed from Lemon City, a settlement near the town of Miami, to Lantana, on the southern shore of Lake Worth, in Palm Beach County. A ferry crossing was established across the New River.

== 1893-1925 ==
Will Stranahan (Frank's brother) with Seminole Indians

In 1893 a young Ohioan named Frank Stranahan arrived to operate the ferry across the New River; he built a house that served as the first trading post, post office, bank and hotel in the area. He later built three more houses on the original site along present-day U.S. 1, the last of which was constructed in 1901. That house stands today as a museum and is Broward County's oldest standing structure. In 1896, the Florida East Coast Railway (FEC) extended its line south from West Palm Beach to Miami, with a station in Fort Lauderdale. The first train stopped in Fort Lauderdale on 22 February 1896. Further development was spurred by the construction of the first automobile bridge across the New River in 1904. In 1911, Ivy Stranahan founded the Fort Lauderdale Woman's Club.

Fort Lauderdale was incorporated later in 1911. In 1915, it became the county seat of the newly established Broward County, which also consisted of the incorporated towns of Dania, Deerfield, Hallandale, and Pompano (all four towns later added "Beach" to their names) and the unincorporated settlement of Davie. The first census after the city's incorporation, the 1920 census, documented a population of 2,065. In 1920, construction of the first canals in the city began, clearing the mangroves and creating the first "finger islands" that became synonymous with the city.

In February 1925, a state-commissioned census recorded 5,625 people in Fort Lauderdale, and a real-estate boom was in progress in South Florida. While the land rush was focused on the Miami area, communities throughout the region, including Fort Lauderdale, Pompano Beach and Boca Raton were swept up in the speculative buying frenzy. A census undertaken by the city during the first week of December 1925 counted a population of 15,315, an increase of 300% in less than 10 months.

By the end of the year, however, the region's infrastructure, unable to cope with the sudden influx, began to crack under the strain. Faced with a supply of materials which far exceeded its shipping capacity, the FEC instituted an embargo on shipping on 18 August 1925, restricting transport to fuel, petroleum, livestock, and perishable goods. On 29 October, all shipments except foodstuffs were eliminated, in an effort to reduce the transport backlog the railroad was experiencing.

== 1926-1945 ==
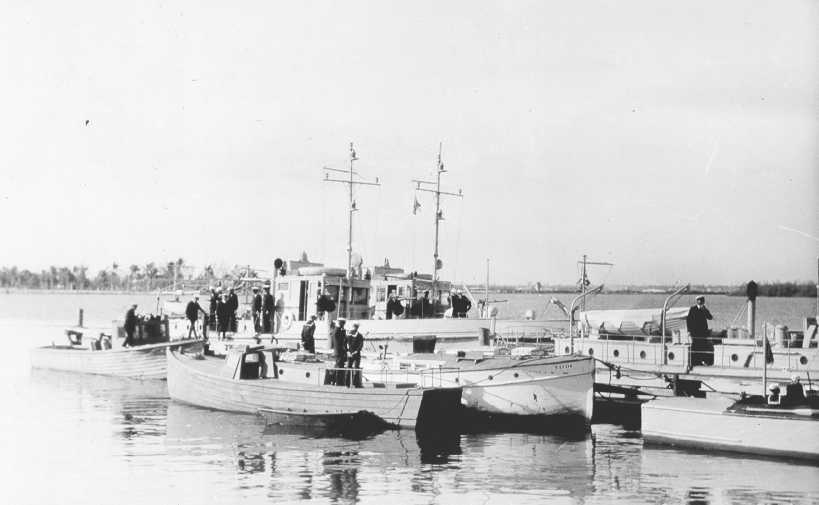
Smugglers being captured in Fort Lauderdale, 1926

The Florida land boom collapsed in 1926. At that time, the only methods of bringing supplies into the area were on the FEC's single track or through the Port of Miami, as Port Everglades was not yet completed. On 10 January 1926, the schooner Prinz Valdemar sank in the channel of the Port of Miami, trapping eleven vessels and effectively blockading the port until 29 February, when the Army Corps of Engineers dug a new channel around the capsized vessel. Real estate firms solely financed by continuous development began to fail, and the financial crisis began to extend to larger developers. The Miami Hurricane of 1926, with the highest sustained winds ever recorded in the state of Florida, was the final blow. Fort Lauderdale suffered extensive damage from the hurricane, which killed 50 people and destroyed an estimated 3500 structures in the city. In February 1928, Port Everglades was opened.

The city had just begun to recover from the 1926 hurricane when another devastating hurricane struck, this time to the north, in Palm Beach County. The 1928 Okeechobee Hurricane only slightly damaged Fort Lauderdale, but the enormous death toll contributed to the perception that Florida was not the paradise that had been promoted by developers. When the Great Depression struck in 1929, it had little effect on the city, which was already in a depression from the real estate bubble burst three years earlier.

While the collapse of the land boom and the depression had reversed the sharp growth of 1925, the population of the city began to grow at a moderate pace. In 1930, there were 8666 people in the city. That number had risen to 17,996 by 1940.

The United States did not enter World War II until 1941, but Fort Lauderdale felt the effect of the war sooner than most of the rest of the country. In December 1939, a British cruiser chased the German freighter Arauca into Port Everglades, where she remained until the US seized her in 1941, when Germany declared war on the US.

The Japanese attack on Pearl Harbor and the United States' subsequent entry into the war had almost immediate effects on the city. Blackouts were imposed, and several allied vessels were torpedoed by German U-boats, including at least one ship within sight of the shoreline. The first Medal of Honor recipient in World War II was a graduate of Fort Lauderdale High School; Second Lieutenant Alexander R. Nininger Jr. was posthumously awarded the Medal of Honor on 29 January 1942 for his actions on 12 January 1942 in Abucay, Bataan, Philippines, during the Japanese invasion.

By mid-1942, the United States Navy had converted Merle Fogg Field into Naval Air Station Fort Lauderdale, and had constructed two satellite landing fields, one at West Prospect Field, and the other in Pompano Beach (which later became Pompano Beach Airpark, home of one of the Goodyear Blimps). By the end of the war, the station had trained thousands of Navy pilots, including future congressman, UN Ambassador, Director of Central Intelligence, and President of the United States George H. W. Bush. Additional facilities in the city included radar and range finding schools and a base at Port Everglades. On 5 December 1945, the five planes of Flight 19 departed on a routine training mission from NAS Fort Lauderdale and were never seen again. It is presumed that the flight leader became disoriented and led the other planes out of range of land, causing the planes to run out of fuel and crash, but no wreckage has been found. The strange disappearance of the flight and the coincidental explosion which destroyed Training 49, a plane involved in a search for the missing squadron, contributed to the Bermuda Triangle myth.

== 1945–1961 ==
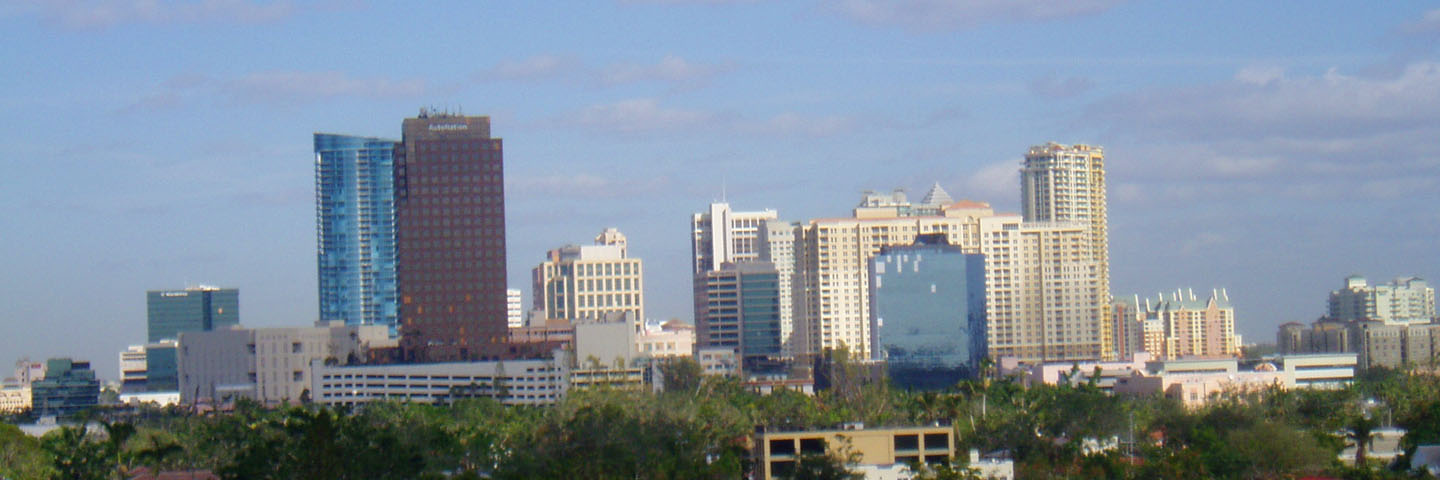
Fort Lauderdale's downtown skyline in 2006

In 1946, the Navy decommissioned its airfields in the area; NAS Fort Lauderdale became Broward County International Airport (later Fort Lauderdale-Hollywood International Airport) and West Prospect Field became Fort Lauderdale Executive Airport, the eleventh-busiest general aviation airport in the country.

One year later, the 1947 Fort Lauderdale Hurricane, an unusually large (120 mile radius) Category 4 hurricane, came ashore just north of the city, causing extensive damage due to flooding. Earlier storms that year had saturated the ground, and the tremendous rainfall from this slow-moving storm left the city (and much of the state) under several inches of water for weeks.

In the 1950s, the city became a favorite destination for college students for spring break, a tradition immortalized in the 1960 film Where the Boys Are. Every year in February, March, and April, tens of thousands of college students would come to relax at the beaches and party at the many bars along A1A.

== Desegregation of Ft. Lauderdale's beaches ==
Starting in 1946, black residents, including the Negro Professional and Business Man's League and Dr. Von D. Mizell, requested that the County designate "a public bathing beach for colored people in Broward County"; they were not permitted at any public beach in the county, although they were tolerated on the privately owned beaches north of Ft. Lauderdale until 1953. Nothing was done about a "colored beach" until 1954, when the county acquired land for the beach, today Dr. Von D. Mizell-Eula Johnson State Park, but it was only accessible by boat and for several years there were no tables or rest rooms. A bridge and access road were constructed after 11 more years, in 1965.

In the meantime, to some extent inspired by the release of Where the Boys Are at the beginning of 1961, frustrated African-American residents, led by Eula Johnson, President of the Broward NAACP chapter, and Dr. Von D. Mizell, conducted a series of "wade-ins" (see sit-ins) on Ft. Lauderdale beaches between July 4 and August 8, 1961. The city of Fort Lauderdale sued them and the NAACP, seeking an injunction to force them to stop "beach wade-in disruptions". Johnson received death threats, and offers of cash and other privileges if she would stop the wade-ins, which she refused to do. In 1962 a judge ruled against the city, and since then Ft. Lauderdale's beaches have been desegregated.

== 1962–present ==
The 1960 Census counted 83,648 people in the city, about 230% of the 1950 figure. A 1967 report estimated that the city was approximately 85% developed, and the 1970 population figure was 139,590 After 1970, as Fort Lauderdale became essentially built out, growth in the area shifted to suburbs to the west. As cities such as Coral Springs, Miramar, and Pembroke Pines experienced explosive growth, Fort Lauderdale's population stagnated, and the city actually shrank by almost 4,000 people between 1980, when the city had 153,279 people, and 1990, when the population was 149,377. A slight rebound brought the population back up to 152,397 at the 2000 census. Since 2000, Fort Lauderdale has gained slightly over 18,000 residents through annexation of seven neighborhoods in unincorporated Broward County.

=== "Spring break-ers" no longer welcome ===
After a rowdy 1985 spring break season, in which an estimated 350,000 college tourists caused disruption for several weeks in the spring, the city passed a series of restrictive laws in an effort to reduce the mayhem caused by the spring break throngs, and the mayor, Robert Dressler, appeared on Good Morning America to tell college students they were not welcome any longer in Fort Lauderdale. Overnight parking was banned near the beach and an open-container law prohibiting the consumption of alcohol in public places was enacted. The following spring, the city denied MTV a permit to set up their stage on the beach, and approximately 2,500 people were arrested as the new laws were strictly enforced. In 1985, 350,000 college students spent about $110 million during the nine-week spring break season; by 2004, 700,000 visitors, mostly families or European tourists, spent $800 million during the same period. By 2006, the number of college students visiting for spring break was estimated at approximately 10,000.

=== Riverwalk project ===
Beginning in 1986, with the passage of a bond issue, the city of Fort Lauderdale began an aggressive effort to connect the city's arts and entertainment district, the historic downtown area, and the Las Olas shopping and beach district, and to shake its long-standing reputation as a cultural wasteland and college-student party town. The centerpiece of the cultural renaissance was the Riverwalk project, which runs along the New River from the Broward Center for the Performing Arts to the Stranahan House, with work in progress to extend the walk to Las Olas Boulevard. The Museum of Art | Fort Lauderdale, which moved into its current location in 1986, and the Museum of Discovery and Science, which opened in its current location in 1992, are cornerstones of the Riverwalk project. A number of upscale high-rise residential towers along the river have encouraged the development of high-end shopping and entertainment throughout the downtown area.

=== Airport shooting ===
The Fort Lauderdale airport shooting resulted in five deaths.

== See also ==
- Fort Lauderdale, Florida
- Timeline of Fort Lauderdale, Florida
- South Florida metropolitan area
- Broward County, Florida
- History of Florida
- New River, Broward County, FL
