= Timeline of Fort Lauderdale, Florida =

The following is a timeline of the history of the city of Fort Lauderdale, Florida, USA.

== 19th century ==
- 1893 - Fort Lauderdale trading post established in Dade County.
- 1896 - Florida East Coast Railroad begins operating.
- 1899 - Schoolhouse established.

== 20th century ==
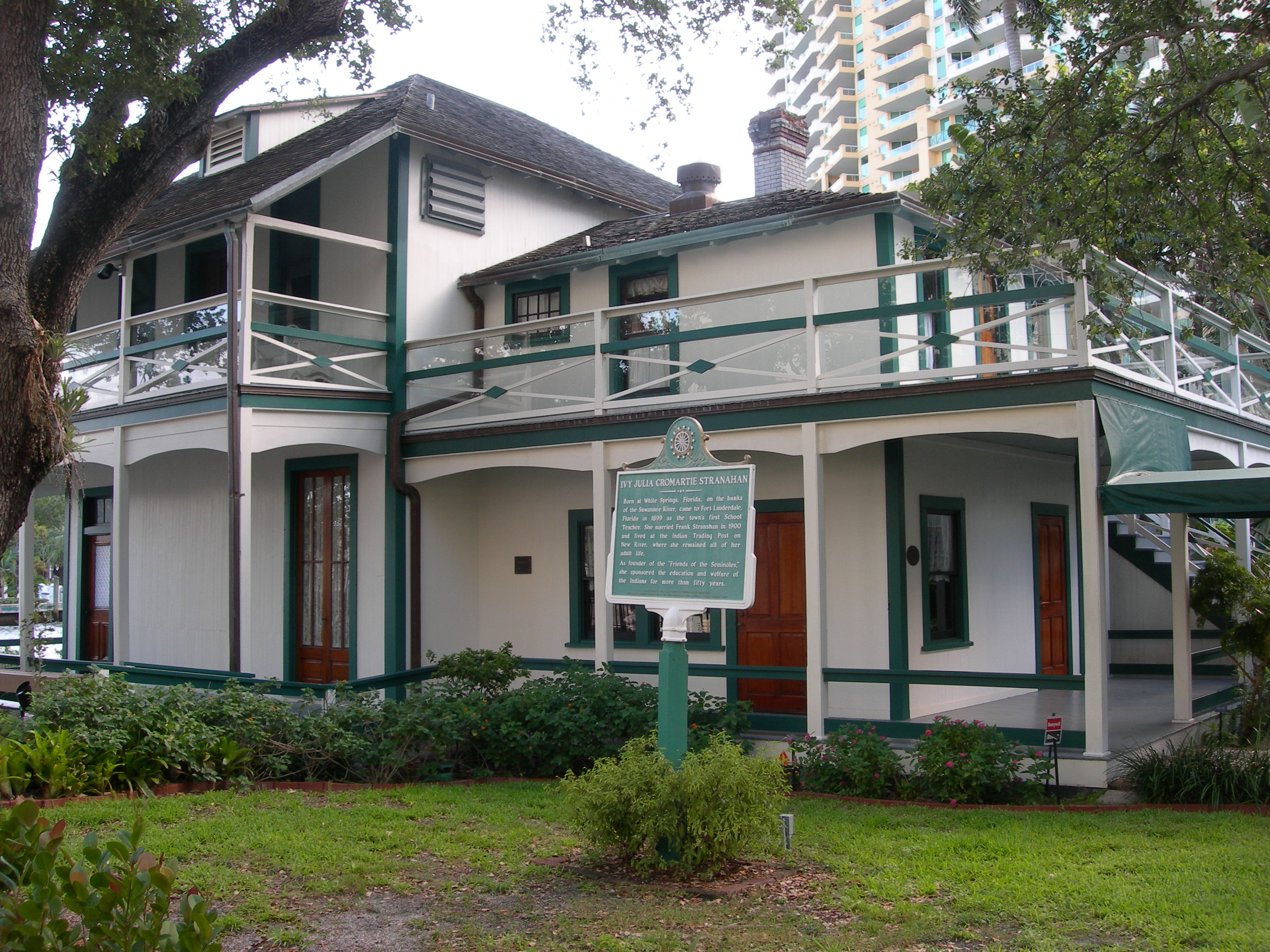
The Stranahan House was constructed in 1901 as a trading post and converted into a residence for the Stranahans in 1906, the house is the oldest surviving structure in Broward County

- 1901 - Stranahan house built.
- 1910 - Population: 336.
- 1911
  - Fort Lauderdale incorporated.
  - Fort Lauderdale Sentinel newspaper begins publication.
  - Office of city marshall created.
- 1912
  - North New River Canal built.
  - W.H. Marshall becomes mayor.
- 1913 - Fire station built.
- 1915 - Fort Lauderdale becomes seat of newly created Broward County.
- 1917
  - Fort Lauderdale Woman's Club built.
  - Las Olas Boulevard built.
- 1919 - Filmmaker D.W. Griffith films The Idol Dancer and The Love Flower in Fort Lauderdale.
- 1925 - Snow-Reed Swing Bridge and Grand Canal Arch Deck Bridge built.

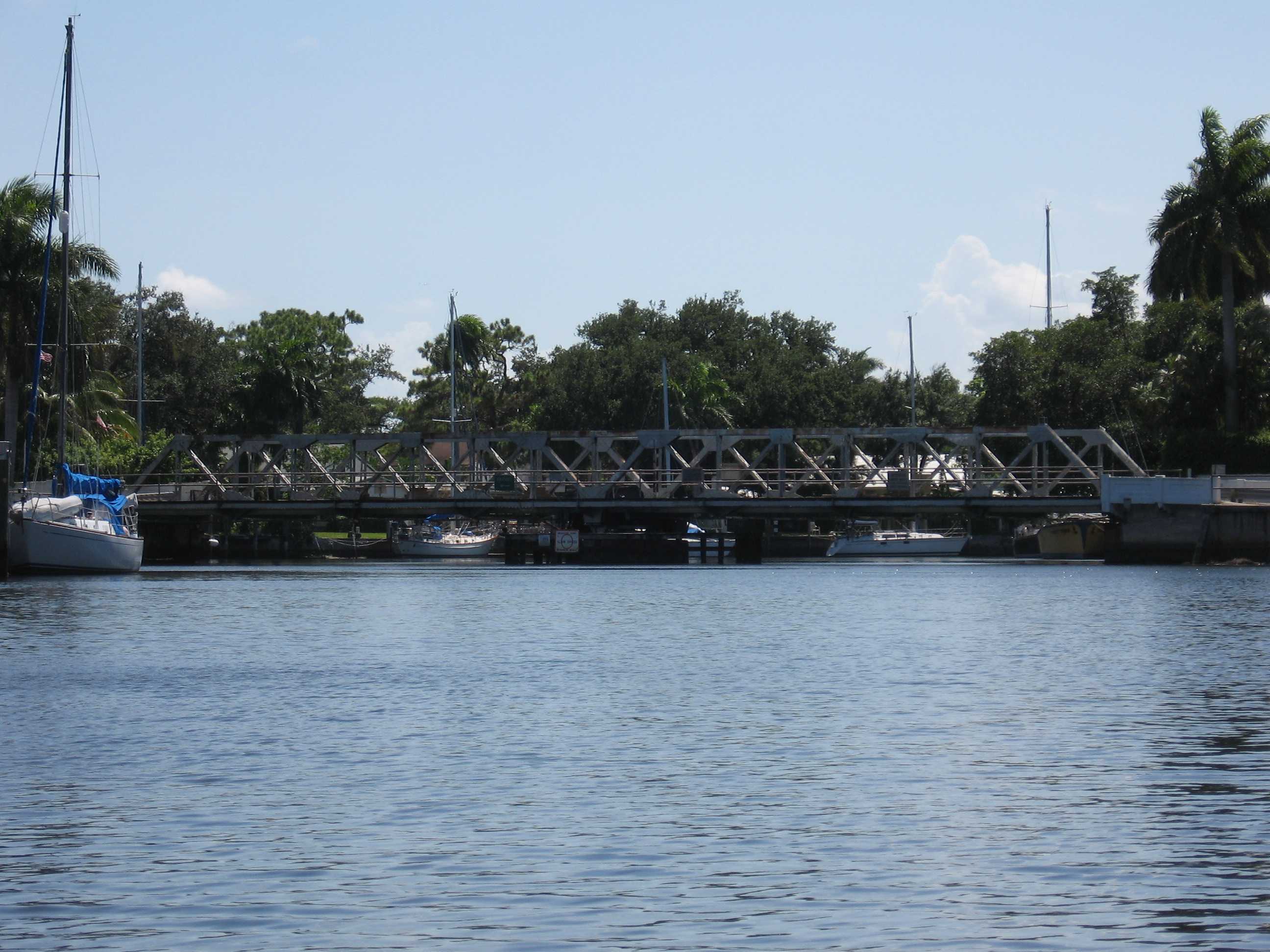
The Snow-Reed Swing Bridge is one of the oldest bridges in the Fort Lauderdale area, and one of the few remaining swing bridges in Florida.

- 1926 - September 18: 1926 Miami hurricane occurs.
- 1927 - Fort Lauderdale station built.
- 1928
  - County Courthouse built.
  - Port Everglades opens.
- 1930 - Population: 8,668.
- 1935 - Hurricane occurs.
- 1939 - Florida Theatre in business.
- 1941 - Hugh Taylor Birch State Park established.
- 1948
  - Broward County International Airport opens.
  - City Hall rebuilt.
- 1950
  - War Memorial Auditorium opens.
  - Population: 36,328.
- 1955 - WWIL radio begins broadcasting.
- 1956 - Federal Drive-In cinema in business.
- 1958
  - Museum of Art opens.
  - WFTL radio begins broadcasting.
- 1959 - Broward Community College founded.
- 1960
  - New River Tunnel opens.
  - Sun-Sentinel newspaper in publication.
  - Davie Boulevard Bridge and SE 3rd Avenue Bridge built.
  - Population: 83,648.

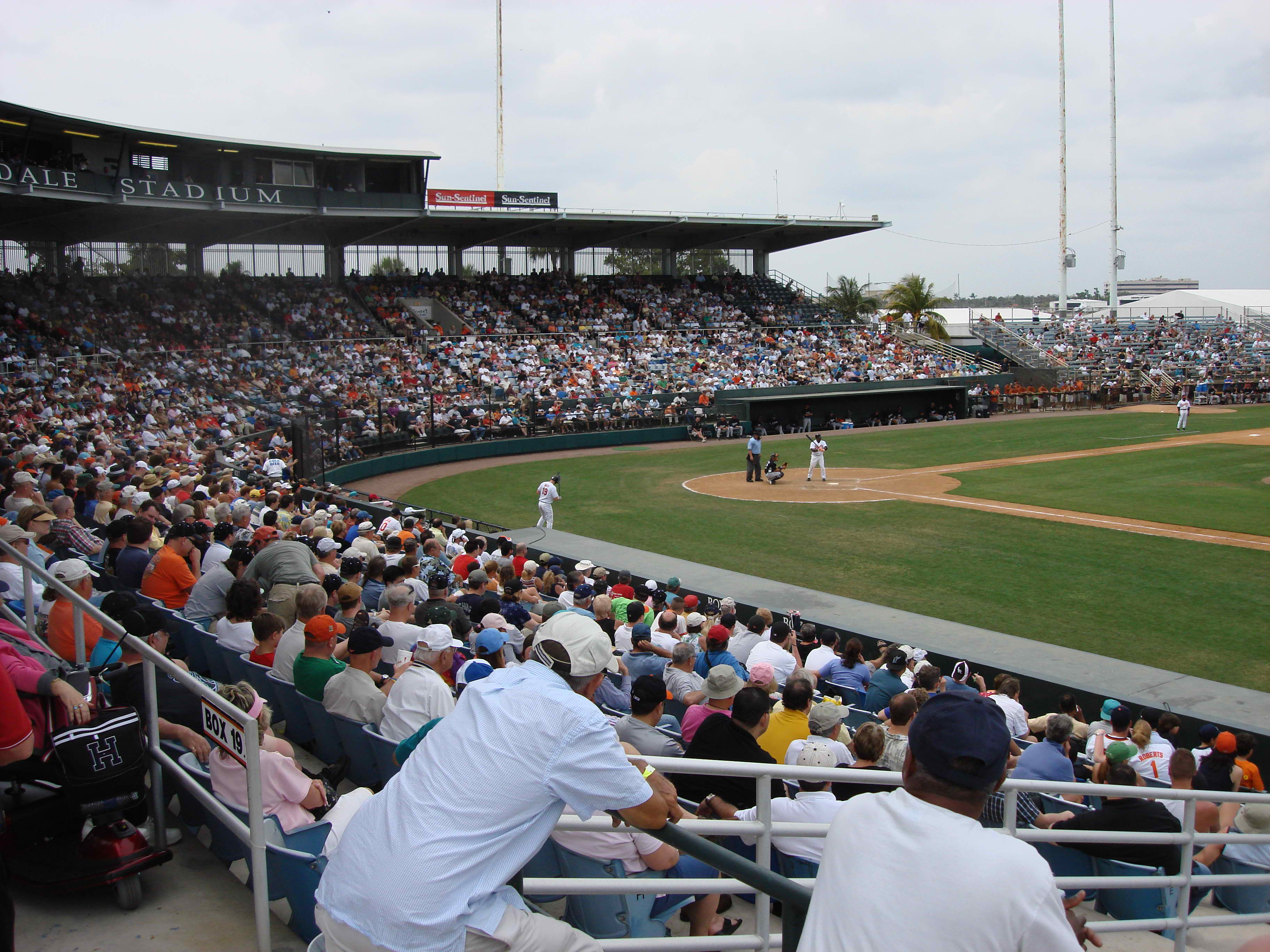
Fort Lauderdale Stadium

- 1962
  - Fort Lauderdale Stadium opens.
  - Fort Lauderdale Historical Society and Fort Lauderdale Yankees baseball team formed.
- 1963 - Fort Lauderdale High School built.
- 1964
  - Nova Southeastern University founded.
  - Marshall Memorial Bridge built.
- 1965 - Fort Lauderdale Pictorial Life magazine begins publication.
- 1967 - Parker Playhouse opens.
- 1970 - Population: 139,122.
- 1971 - Regional Broward County Transit formed.
- 1972 - Broward County Historical Commission founded.
- 1974 - Broward County Library System established.
- 1977
  - Snowfall occurs.
  - Genealogical Society of Broward County chartered.
- 1983 - Municipal jail begins operating.
- 1989 - Regional Tri-Rail begins operating.
- 1991 - Broward Center for the Performing Arts opens.
- 1992 - August: Hurricane Andrew occurs.
- 1998 - City website online (approximate date).
- 1999 - Broward County Central Homeless Assistance Center opens.
- 2000
  - Nutrition Center opens.
  - Fort Lauderdale Antique Car Museum active.

== 21st century ==
- 2003 - Fort Lauderdale Fire and Safety Museum founded.
- 2009 - Jack Seiler becomes mayor.
- 2010 - Population: 165,521.
- 2014
  - Higher-speed rail Fort Lauderdale station (Brightline) construction begins.
  - Mormon temple built.
- 2017
  - January 6: Fort Lauderdale airport shooting occurs.
  - Ted Deutch becomes U.S. representative for Florida's 22nd congressional district.

== See also ==
- History of Fort Lauderdale, Florida
- List of mayors of Fort Lauderdale, Florida
- National Register of Historic Places listings in Broward County, Florida
- Timelines of other cities in the South Florida area of Florida: Boca Raton, Hialeah, Hollywood, Miami, Miami Beach, West Palm Beach

== Bibliography ==
- "Fort Lauderdale". Florida State Gazetteer and Business Directory. R. L. Polk & Co. 1911.
  - 1918 ed.
- Federal Writers’ Project (1939). "Fort Lauderdale". Florida: a Guide to the Southernmost State. American Guide Series. New York: Oxford University Press. pp. 317–318.
- Philip J. Weidling and August Burghard. Checkered Sunshine: The Story of Fort Lauderdale, 1793-1955 (Gainesville: University of Florida Press, 1966)
- Ory Mazar Nergal, ed. (1980), "Ft. Lauderdale, FL", Encyclopedia of American Cities, New York: E.P. Dutton, OL 4120668M
- Susan Gillis; Daniel T. Hobb (1999). Fort Lauderdale. Images of America. Charleston, SC: Arcadia. ISBN 9780738542027.
- Susan Gillis (2004). Fort Lauderdale: The Venice of America. Charleston, SC: Arcadia. ISBN 9780738524719.
- Paul T. Hellmann (2006). "Florida: Fort Lauderdale". Historical Gazetteer of the United States. Taylor & Francis. ISBN 1-135-94859-3.
- William G. Crawford, Jr. (2007). "Long Hard Fight for Equal Rights: A History of Broward County's Colored Beach and the Fort Lauderdale Beach "Wade-ins' of the Summer of 1961" (PDF). Tequesta. 67. Historical Association of Southern Florida. ISSN 0363-3705.
