= List of museums in Broward County, Florida =

The following museums are located in Broward County, Florida.

- African-American Research Library and Cultural Center, Fort Lauderdale
- Bienes Museum of the Modern Book
- Bonnet House Museum & Gardens
- Coral Springs Museum of Art
- Ely Educational Museum, Pompano Beach
- Fort Lauderdale Antique Car Museum^{[usurped]}
- Fort Lauderdale Fire and Safety Museum
- Fort Lauderdale History Center
- Holocaust Documentation & Education Center, Dania Beach, raising funds for a future South Florida Holocaust Museum
- IGFA Fishing Hall of Fame and Museum, Dania Beach
- International Swimming Hall of Fame museum
- James D. and Alice Butler House, Deerfield Beach
- Kester Cottages, Pompano Beach
- Museum of Art Fort Lauderdale
- Museum of Discovery and Science
- Old Deerfield School, Deerfield Beach
- Old Dillard Museum
- Old Pompano Fire Station, Pompano Beach
- Sample-McDougald House, Pompano Beach
- Stonewall National Museum & Archives
- Stranahan House, the oldest house in Broward County.
- Naval Air Station Fort Lauderdale Museum, World War II, flight 19, and on the register of historic places.
- World AIDS Museum and Educational Center, Wilton Manors'
- Wiener Museum of Decorative Arts, Dania Beach

Defunct museum:

- Afro-American Museum of Pompano Beach
