= Timeline of Hialeah, Florida =

The following is a timeline of the history of the city of Hialeah, Florida, USA.

== 20th century ==
- 1921 - Hialeah founded with the first plan drawn up and the town named.
- 1924
  - Miami-Hialeah Florida East Coast Railway line and Miami River Canal Swing Bridge built.
  - Hialeah Women's Club opens town library.
- 1925
  - Hialeah incorporated.
  - Hialeah Park Race Track built for horse racing.
  - Hialeah Chamber of Commerce established.
- 1926
  - Hurricane.
  - Hialeah Seaboard Air Line Railway Station built.
- 1927 - Hialeah-Miami Springs Vertical Lift Bridge opens.
- 1944 - Home News begins publication.
- 1948 - Town of Hialeah Gardens incorporated near Hialeah.
- 1958 - City of Hialeah Public Library building opens.
- 1961 - M.A. Milam Elementary School established.
- 1969 - El Sol de Hialeah newspaper begins publication.
- 1970 - El Día newspaper begins publication.
- 1971 - Westfield Westland shopping mall in business.
- 1973
  - KC and the Sunshine Band (musical group) formed.
  - TK Records and Colonial Twin cinema in business.
- 1974 - Santería Church of Lukumi Babalu Aye established.
- 1979 - Citrus Health Network founded.
- 1980
  - Miami Dade College Hialeah campus established.
  - Apollo North cinema in business.
- 1981 - Raúl L. Martínez becomes mayor.
- 1982 - El Hispano newspaper begins publication.
- 1985
  - Hialeah station (Metrorail) and Okeechobee station (Metrorail) open.
  - El Condado News begins publication.
- 1987 - Mi Casa newspaper begins publication.
  - Christian Gomez is born.
- 1989
  - Tri-Rail commuter rail Miami Airport station opens.
  - Carmike cinema in business.
- 1990
  - April: Mayor Martínez indicted for racketeering and suspended from office.
  - Population: 188,004.
- 1993
  - U.S. Supreme Court decides animal sacrifice-related Church of Lukumi Babalu Aye v. City of Hialeah in favor of freedom of religion (over city public health regulation).
  - Carrie P. Meek becomes U.S. representative for 27th congressional district.
- 1999
  - Telemundo television headquarters relocated to Hialeah.
  - City website online (approximate date).
- 2000 - 75th anniversary of city founding.

== 21st century ==
- 2005 - Julio Robaina becomes mayor.
- 2008 - Westland Hialeah High School and City of Hialeah Educational Academy open.
- 2010 - Population: 224,669.
- 2011
  - May: Carlos Hernández becomes acting mayor.
  - November: Hialeah mayoral election, 2011 held.
- 2013
  - January: Ileana Ros-Lehtinen becomes U.S. representative for Florida's newly created 27th congressional district.
  - July: Shooting at Todel Apartments.
- 2014 - Aldi grocery chain opens store in Hileah.
- 2015
  - Miami Watersports Complex opens.
  - Population: 237,082 (estimate).
- 2021: Shooting.

== See also ==
- Hialeah history
- List of mayors of Hialeah, Florida
- Timelines of other cities in the South Florida area of Florida: Boca Raton, Fort Lauderdale, Hollywood, Miami, Miami Beach, West Palm Beach

== Bibliography ==
- Federal Writers’ Project (1941). "Chronology". Planning Your Vacation in Florida Miami and Dade County. American Guide Series. Northport, NY: Bacon, Percy & Daggett. ISBN 9780404579074.
- Peter D. Klingman (1974). "Ernest Graham and the Hialeah Charter Fight of 1937" (PDF). Tequesta. 34. Historical Association of Southern Florida. ISSN 0363-3705 – via Florida International University.
- Paul T. Hellmann (2006). "Florida: Hialeah". Historical Gazetteer of the United States. Routledge. ISBN 1-135-94859-3.
- Seth H. Bramson (2008). The Curtiss-Bright Cities: Hialeah, Miami Springs & Opa Locka. Charleston, SC: History Press. ISBN 978-1-59629-386-1.
