= Von Delany Mizell =

American physician

Von D. Mizell
- Born: Von Delaney Mizell; January 16, 1910; Jasper, Florida, U.S.
- Died: July 16, 1973 (aged 63); Boston, Massachusetts, U.S.
- Occupations: Physician and activist
- Known for: Fort Lauderdale NAACP leader
- Honors: Dr. Von D. Mizell-Eula Johnson State Park

Von Delaney Mizell (January 16, 1910 – July 16, 1973) was a medical doctor and Civil Rights activist in South Florida. He was the first child of Isidore and Minnie Mizell, early Black residents of Broward County, Florida. He earned his Bachelor's degree from Morehouse College in Atlanta, Georgia in 1932 and completed his medical training at Meharry Medical College in 1936. While attending Morehouse, he was initiated into the Chi chapter of Phi Beta Sigma fraternity. In 1937 he returned to his hometown of Fort Lauderdale to establish a private practice and became one of only two Black physicians in the city, alongside James F. Sistrunk. Since at that time Fort Lauderdale's hospitals would not accept "colored" patients, in 1938 he helped establish Provident Hospital for Black residents. During World War II, Mizell served as a second lieutenant in the Army Reserve and Medical Corps, where he protested the segregated conditions of Black servicemembers.

In 1942 Mizell participated in leading the boycott of Fort Lauderdale’s "Colored School", now the Walker Elementary School, which pressured the Broward County School Board to extend the Colored School's school year from six months to nine months, allowing the school to gain accreditation. In 1945, Mizell and others started the first NAACP chapter in Broward County. He successfully sued the Broward County Medical Association for admittance. He was also involved in years-long efforts to provide a beach for Fort Lauderdale's Black residents to use and to desegregate Broward County's other beaches, culminating in the 1961 Beach Wade-Ins. In 1963, president John F. Kennedy appointed Mizell to the White House Committee on Hospitals.

== Legacy ==
- The site of Provident Hospital, which has been torn down, is occupied by a community center, the Von D. Mizell Community Center, owned by the city of Fort Lauderdale.
- In 2010, the Broward County government declared July 31st "Mizell Family Legacy Appreciation Day" and "Don Mizell Appreciation Day" in recognition of Dr. Mizell's grandson, Don Mizell, who is a Fort-Lauderdale native and Harvard-trained intellectual property attorney who has been practicing for more than four decades.
- On July 1, 2016, John U. Lloyd Beach State Park was renamed the Dr. Von D. Mizell-Eula Johnson State Park in honor of civil rights efforts undertaken by Mizell and Eula Johnson during segregation.

=== Ethel Mizell Pappy Collection ===
Von D. Mizell's sister, Ethel Mizell Pappy, donated her family papers to the African-American Research Library and Cultural Center in Fort Lauderdale, FL. The papers contain materials documenting Von D. Mizell's life and career as well as Provident Hospital.

- Ethel Mizell Pappy family papers, African-American Research Library and Cultural Center, Broward County Library.

=== Continued Tradition of Education ===
Ethel's daughter and Von Delaney's niece, Rosamond, was the first African American student to integrate a "White's only" school within the Broward County Public Schools system.
