= Museum of Contemporary Art, North Miami =

Museum of Contemporary Art (MoCA)
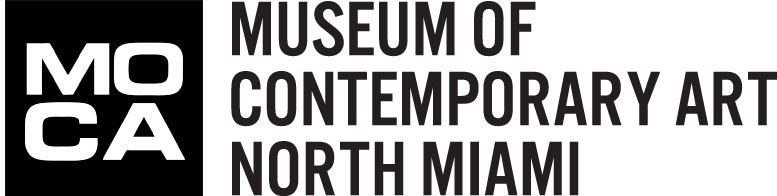

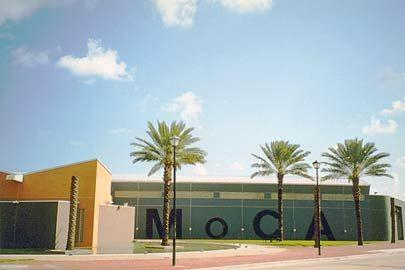

- Location within Florida
- Established: 1994
- Location: 770 NE 125 Street; North Miami, Florida, United States
- Coordinates: 25.89041°N 80.18325°W
- Type: Art museum
- Director: Chana Sheldon
- Curator: Chana Sheldon
- Website: mocanomi.org

The Museum of Contemporary Art (MOCA) is a collecting museum located in North Miami, Florida. The 23,000-square-foot (2,100 m^{2}) building was designed by the architecture firm Gwathmey Siegel & Associates Architects, New York City.

== History ==
The Museum of Contemporary Art began as the Center for Contemporary art in a single gallery space in 1981. In 1996, the museum opened a new building, following the establishment of its permanent collection in 1995. The museum was directed by art historian and curator Bonnie Clearwater from 1993 until 2013. Clearwater considered MOCA an "education museum", and under her directorship the institution was awarded an IMLS National Medal for Museum and Library Service in 2012.

MOCA has presented solo and survey exhibitions by artists including Bill Viola, Tracey Emin, Edouard Duval-Carrié, Virginia Overton, Purvis Young, Wangechi Mutu, Michael Richards, and many others. In 2008, the institution received a $5 million endowment from the Knight Exhibition Series, supporting exhibitions of work by emerging artists, the development of new public programs, enhanced school programs, and the presentation of lectures, performances, and film screenings. MOCA's Optic Nerve was recognized as an important forum for emerging artists working in film. Over 220 artists have been featured in this series, many of them publicly presenting their work for the first time.

In Fall 2014, some members of the museum's board of trustees split and established a new arts organization, the Institute of Contemporary Art, in Miami's Design District. In a settlement, approximately 70% of MOCA's 700 works remained in MOCA's collection, and 200 pieces were to be held by the new organization.

In January 2018, the City of North Miami appointed Chana Budgazad Sheldon, previously executive director of the Miami alternative exhibition space Locust Projects, as MOCA's director.

== Outreach ==
MOCA has several different outreach programs.

== See also ==
- North Miami, Florida
- Miami-Dade County, Florida
- List of contemporary art museums
