= New River (Broward County, Florida) =

Estuary in Florida, United States

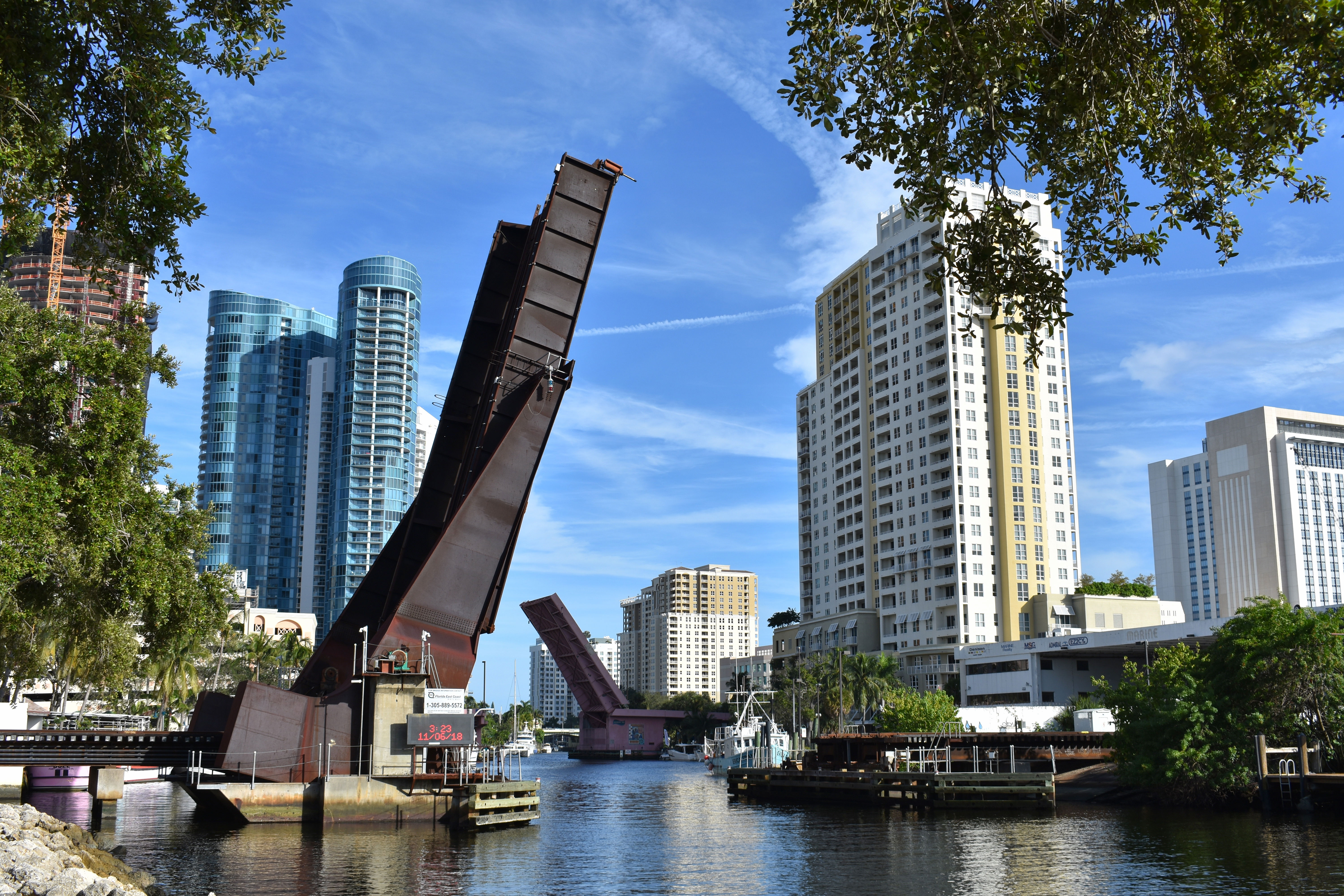
- The New River as seen in downtown Fort Lauderdale.

- Location within Florida

Location
- Country: United States
- State: Florida
- County: Broward County

Physical characteristics
- Source
  - coordinates: 26.1109199°N 80.1122665°W

The New River is a tidal estuary in South Florida, United States. Despite its name, it is not a true natural river, but a channel composed of many tributary canals. The channel is connected to the Everglades through a series of man-made canals. After passing through Fort Lauderdale, the channel connects to the Intracoastal Waterway and Atlantic Ocean at Port Everglades cut. The channel is entirely within Broward County and is composed from the junction of three main canals which originate in the Everglades, splitting off from the Miami Canal. They are the North New River Canal, which flows south from Lake Okeechobee along the east side of U.S. 27 and then east along the north side of State Road 84 / Interstate 595; the South New River Canal, which flows east from the Miami Canal along the north side of Griffin Road and the south side of Orange Drive; and a canal which flows east along the south side of Sunrise Boulevard. The Henry E. Kinney Tunnel in downtown Fort Lauderdale travels underneath the New River.

== Etymology ==
According to a legend attributed in 1940 to the Seminoles by writers working in the Florida Writers’ Program of the Works Progress Administration, the New River had appeared suddenly after a night of strong winds, loud noises, and shaking ground, resulting in the Seminoles calling the river Himmarshee, meaning "new water". The report of the Writers' Project attributed the noise and shaking to an earthquake which collapsed the roof of an underground river. Folk historian Lawrence Will relates that the Seminole name for the river was Coontie-Hatchee, for the coontie (Zamia integrifolia) that grew along the river, and that the chamber of commerce tried to change the name of the river to Himmarshee-Hatchee during the 1920s Florida land boom.

The English name is derived from early explorer's maps. The mouth of the river was noted for its tendency to continuously change its entry point into the Atlantic Ocean through the shifting sand of the barrier island. Each time the coast was surveyed and charted the entry point would have shifted. So the location of the mouth would not be on any previous maps, and from off the coast would appear as if it had just developed. With each charting, the location would be recorded with the notation "new river". Since that was the name used on the maps, that was the name by which the first settlers came to know it, so the name stayed.

== History ==
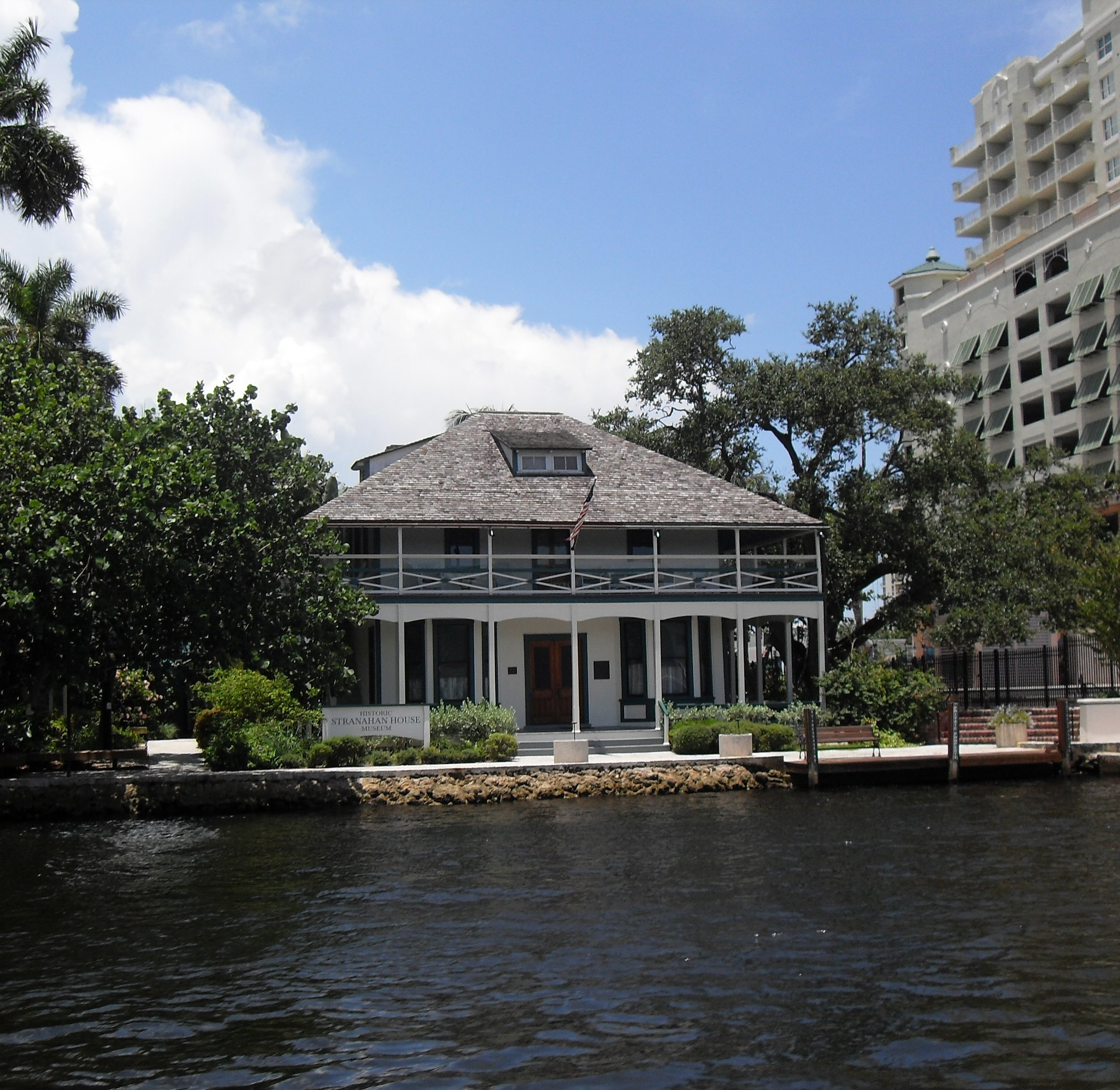
Stranahan House, the oldest building in Fort Lauderdale, originally built as a trading post

The area along the New River was occupied in prehistoric times by people of the Glades culture. At the time of first contact with Europeans, Tequesta people lived in the area. The Tequesta were gone by the middle of the 18th century. In 1788 Bahamians Charles and Frankee Lewis had established the earliest settlement along the river. The settlers fled the area with the start of the Second Seminole War, and the U.S. Army built a series of forts called Fort Lauderdale near the river. The first fort was where the North and South Forks joined. The fort was later moved to Tarpon Bend, and then to the barrier island near present-day Bahia Mar. A trading post established in the 1890s by Frank Stranahan (1864–1929) at a ferry crossing of the New River became the nucleus of the city of Fort Lauderdale. Years later, Mrs. Ivy Stranahan recollected that in the early days of the trading post, the New River was so clear that fish and even large sharks could be easily seen in its depths.

Prior to the 20th century, the New River originated as two streams, the North Fork and South Fork, which merged and connected directly to the Atlantic Ocean via the now defunct New River Inlet. The river was heavily modified in the first half of the 20th century. The North Fork was extended as the C-12 Canal along present-day Sunrise Boulevard, while the South Fork was extended by two canals, one of which was the C-11 or South New River Canal, which connects to the Miami Canal. The South New River Canal also connects to the Dania Cutoff Canal, which leads eastward from the C-11 canal to the Intracoastal Waterway.

== North New River Canal ==
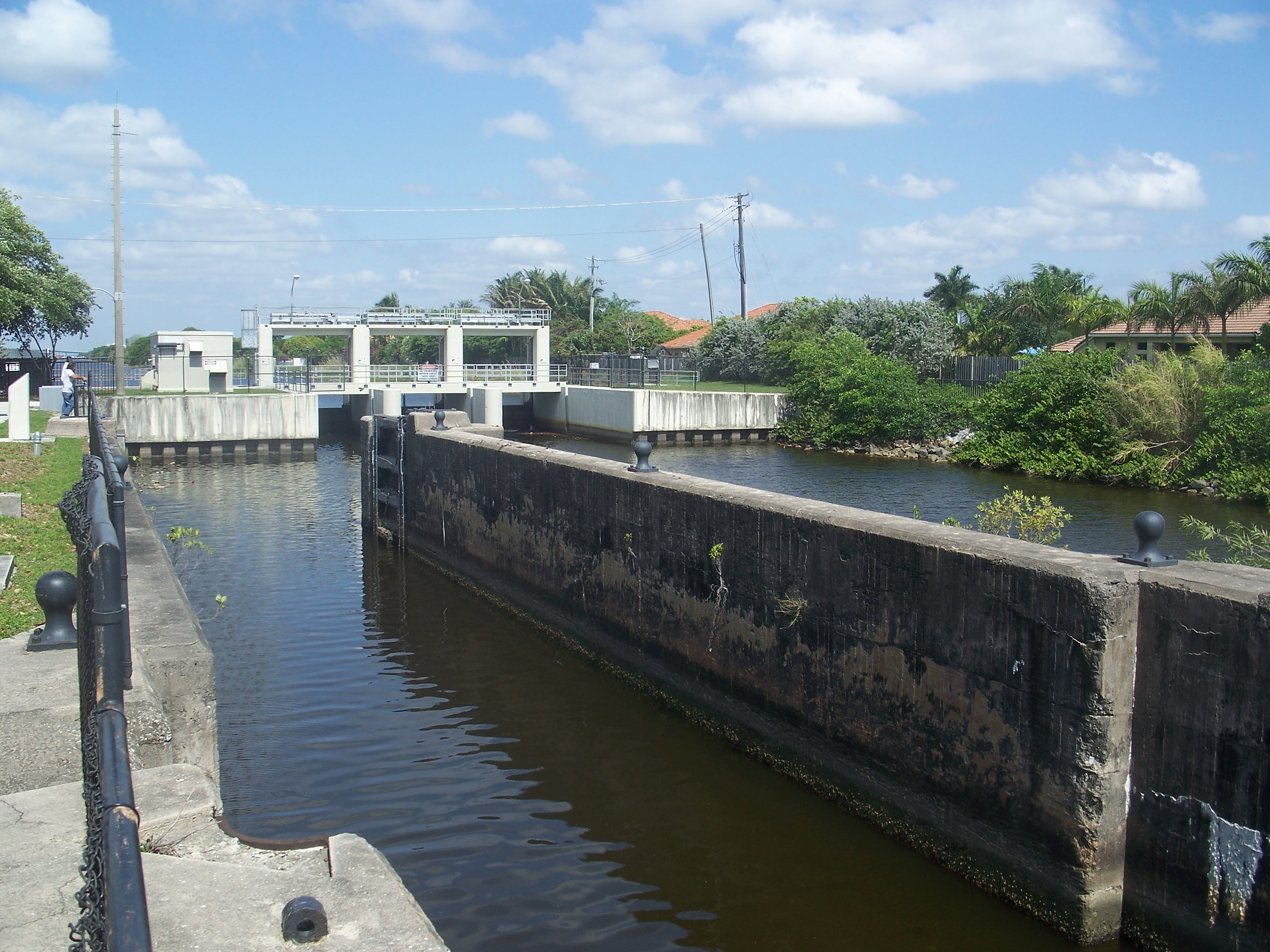
Lock No. 1 on the North New River Canal, with modern water control structure in background

The most significant extension of the New River, however, was the first, an extension of the South Fork called the North New River Canal (also known as the G-15 canal). Dredging for the canal began in 1906, not long after Napoleon B. Broward won the governorship of Florida on a promise to drain the Everglades. The canal extended approximately 42 miles south-southeast from Lake Okeechobee, then turned east-southeast and proceeded for approximately 16 miles to the former terminus of the river near what would become the Riverland section of Fort Lauderdale. The canal was completed in 1912 after construction of Lock No. 1, North New River Canal, in the southeast corner of what is today Plantation, Florida, just under 2 miles west of the current Fort Lauderdale city border.

The North New River Canal served as a significant transportation route to and from the state's interior section south of Lake Okeechobee. Steamships and other boats traveled the length of the canal bringing lumber, farm equipment, and people to communities such as Okeelanta and South Bay in the area south of the lake. The boats then ferried produce from the communities' farms back to the coast, where the goods were shipped north by rail. Due to shoaling (silting) in the canal and newly constructed road and rail links to the interior section, Lock No. 1 was closed to boat traffic in 1926.

The canal itself became one of South Florida's major water control systems. It is currently managed by the South Florida Water Management District. Lock No. 1 was added to the U.S. National Register of Historic Places in 1978.

== See also ==
- Snow-Reed Swing Bridge
- Summerfield Boat Works
