= Provident Hospital (Fort Lauderdale) =

Geography
- Location: 1409 Sixth Street in Fort Lauderdale, Florida, United States
- Coordinates: 26.129889°N 80.160210°W

Organization
- Type: General
- Affiliated university: African American

History
- Opened: 1938
- Closed: after 1964

Links
- Lists: Hospitals in Florida

Provident Hospital was a small facility in Fort Lauderdale, Florida. It was founded in 1938 by two African-American physicians, Von D. Mizell and James Sistrunk; none of the existing hospitals in Fort Lauderdale would accept African-American patients.

In 1937, a young black man named John McBride was shot in the stomach by a car full of white men rumored to be members of the Ku Klux Klan. Hospitals in the area near the Pompano Beach shooting at first refused to admit him. A black physician, Dr. Von D. Mizell, ultimately persuaded one of them to take him in. But the hospital later insisted on moving McBride to a rundown sanitarium, where he soon died.

The hospital was torn down by the city after the city's hospitals were integrated after passage of the Civil Rights Act of 1964, and Medicare refused to support segregated hospitals. The building was replaced by the Mizell Center, a community center.

== See also ==
- Florida A&M Hospital
