= Summerfield Boat Works =

Summerfield Boat Works Logo

Summerfield Boat Works was a boat yard along the New River in Fort Lauderdale, Florida from 1930 to 2006. The boat yard was named after Hank Summerfield who traded a sloop for the property in 1940. In 1960, Summerfield died, but the facility remained family owned. Greyhawk Marine Group purchased the yard and renamed her as Pier 17 in February 2005. As of October 2018, a real-estate development company out of Alabama, Hix Snedeker Companies, is pursuing approvals for the property to become South Fork Marina, a 34-slip mega-yacht facility.
