= Bonnie Clearwater =

American writer and art historian

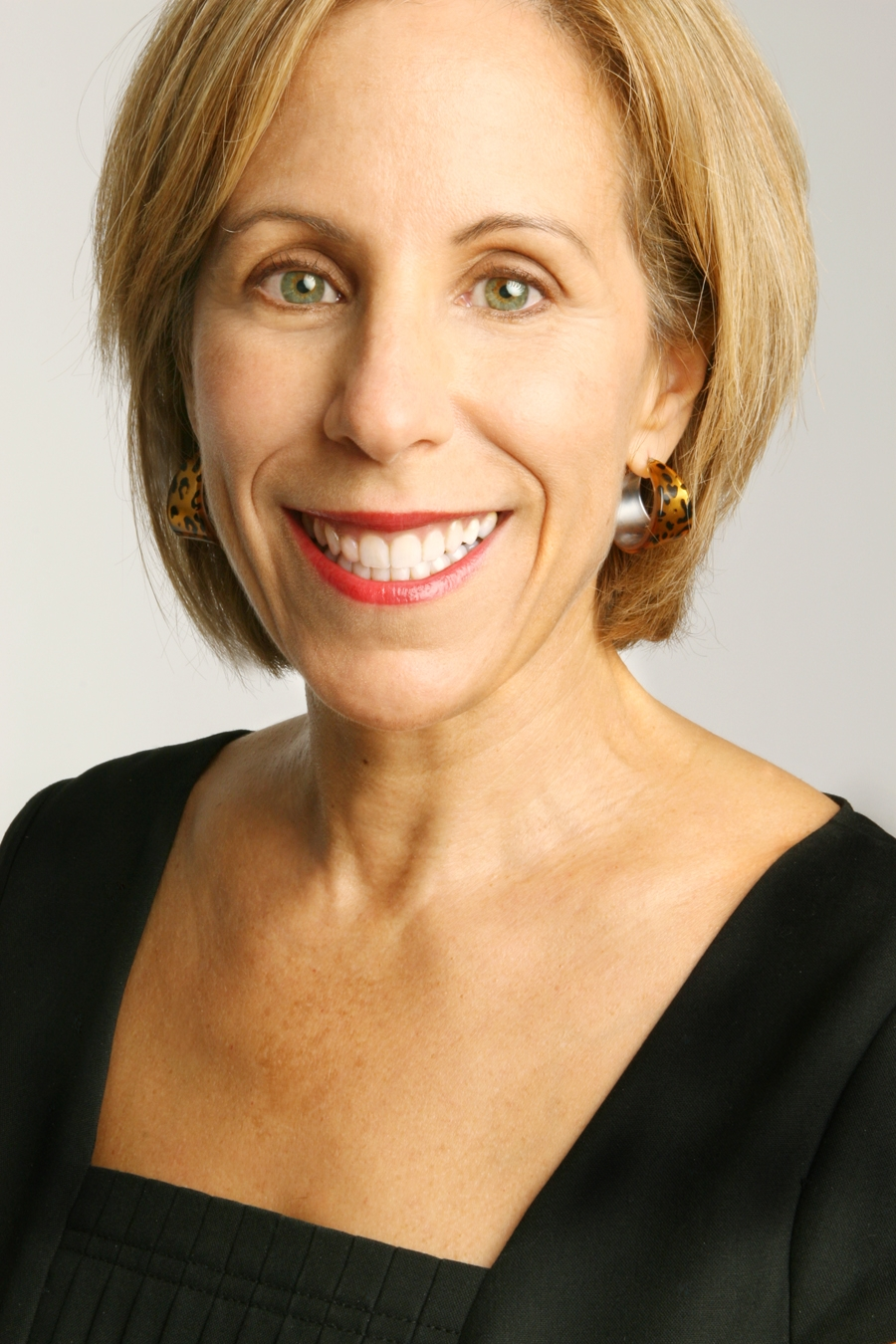
Bonnie Clearwater'

Bonnie Clearwater (born 1957) is an American writer and art historian. She is the director and chief curator of Nova Southeastern University's Museum of Art Fort Lauderdale. Previously, Clearwater was the director and chief curator of Museum of Contemporary Art, North Miami. She has a particular interest in the work of Mark Rothko.

Clearwater studied art history at NYU then attended graduate school at Columbia University, where she studied modern and medieval art, graduating with a master's degree in the late '70s. Clearwater went on to be personal curator for Leonard Lauder for six years while she then curated the Rothko Foundation in New York City from 1980, and she was then the program director of the Lannan Foundation in Los Angeles from January 1986. In the early '90s, she moved to Miami where she saw potential for an exciting, emerging art scene. Clearwater became head curator of the MOCA North Miami in 1994, and programs director in 1997. In 2007 she curated the Albanian Pavilion at the 52nd Venice Biennale.

Some of Clearwater's publications include "The Rothko Book: Tate Essential Artist Series," "Julian Schnabel: Versions of Chuck," and "Roberto Juarez: A Sense of Place."

Clearwater is originally from Rockland County, N.Y. She is married to Jim Clearwater, who runs the art-book publishing company Grassfield Press.
