= Dr. Von D. Mizell-Eula Johnson State Park =

State park in Florida, United States

- IUCN category IV (habitat/species management area)
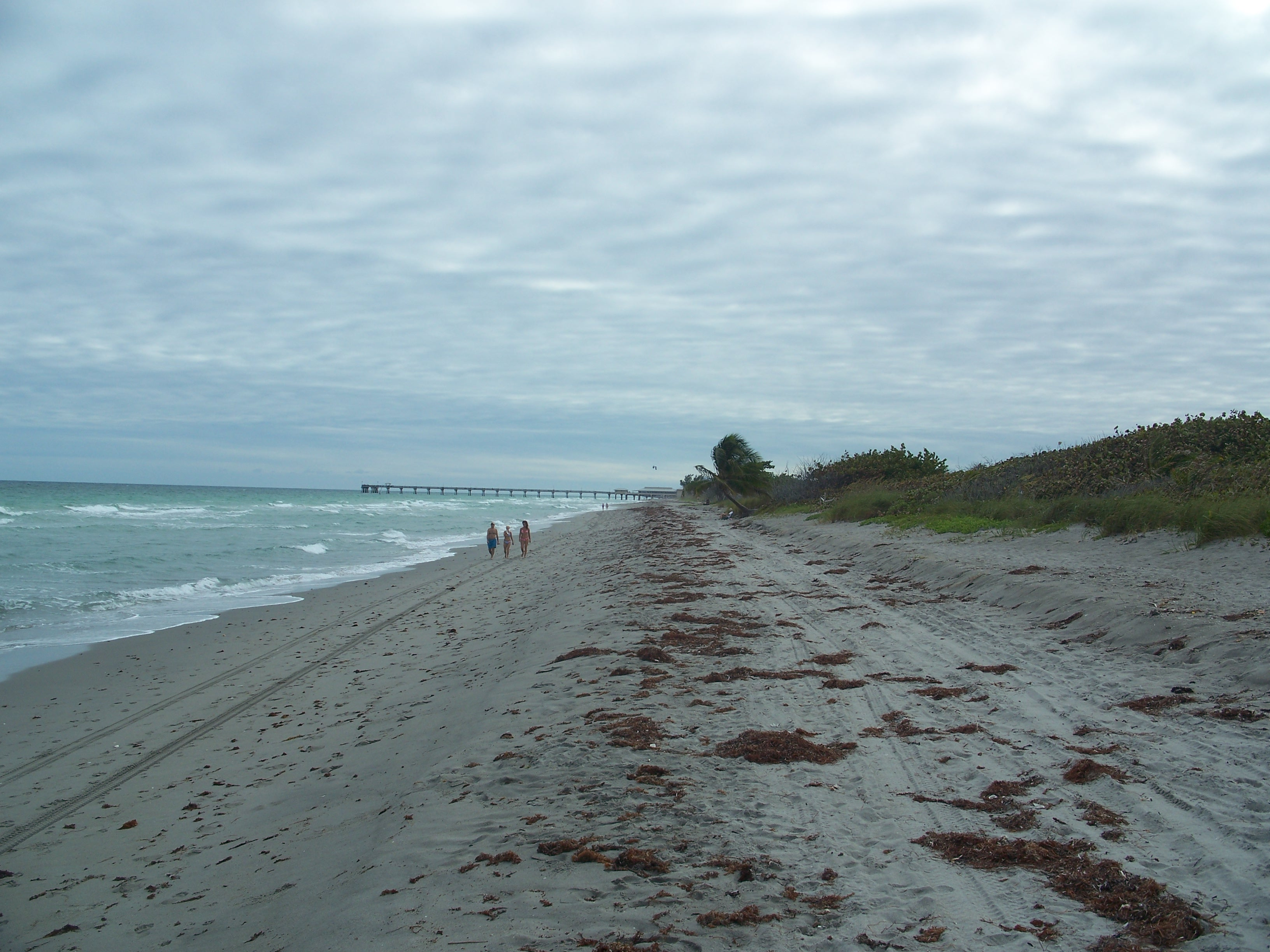
- View of the beach

- Location within Florida Location within the United States
- Interactive map of Dr. Von D. Mizell-Eula Johnson State Park
- Location: Broward County, Florida, USA
- Nearest city: Hollywood, Florida
- Coordinates: 26°04′12″N 80°06′47″W
- Established: 1973
- Governing body: Florida Department of Environmental Protection

Dr. Von D. Mizell-Eula Johnson State Park is a Florida State Park located in Dania Beach, Florida off Florida State Road A1A. The park is named for late civil rights activists Von Mizell and Eula Johnson, who first pressured Broward County (for years) to have at least one beach for African Americans, then led wade-ins in Ft. Lauderdale in 1961 that led to desegregation of the county's beaches the following year. The park's former namesake, John U. Lloyd, served as Broward County Attorney for over 30 years and was instrumental in obtaining the land for the park.

== History ==
The park, opened in 1953, was originally the first beach open to African Americans in Broward County, and was first called simply "the Colored Beach". According to its official web page, "it was once the county's designated 'colored beach'". That it came into existence was due to 7 years of effort by Dr. Mizell and others. "The next challenge was getting the County to approve the construction of an access road leading to the beach, which still lacked any restrooms or shelter." Access was only by boat. A road was built in 1965. Thanks to the efforts of Mizell and Johnson, Broward County Beaches were desegregated in 1962.

== Activities and amenities ==
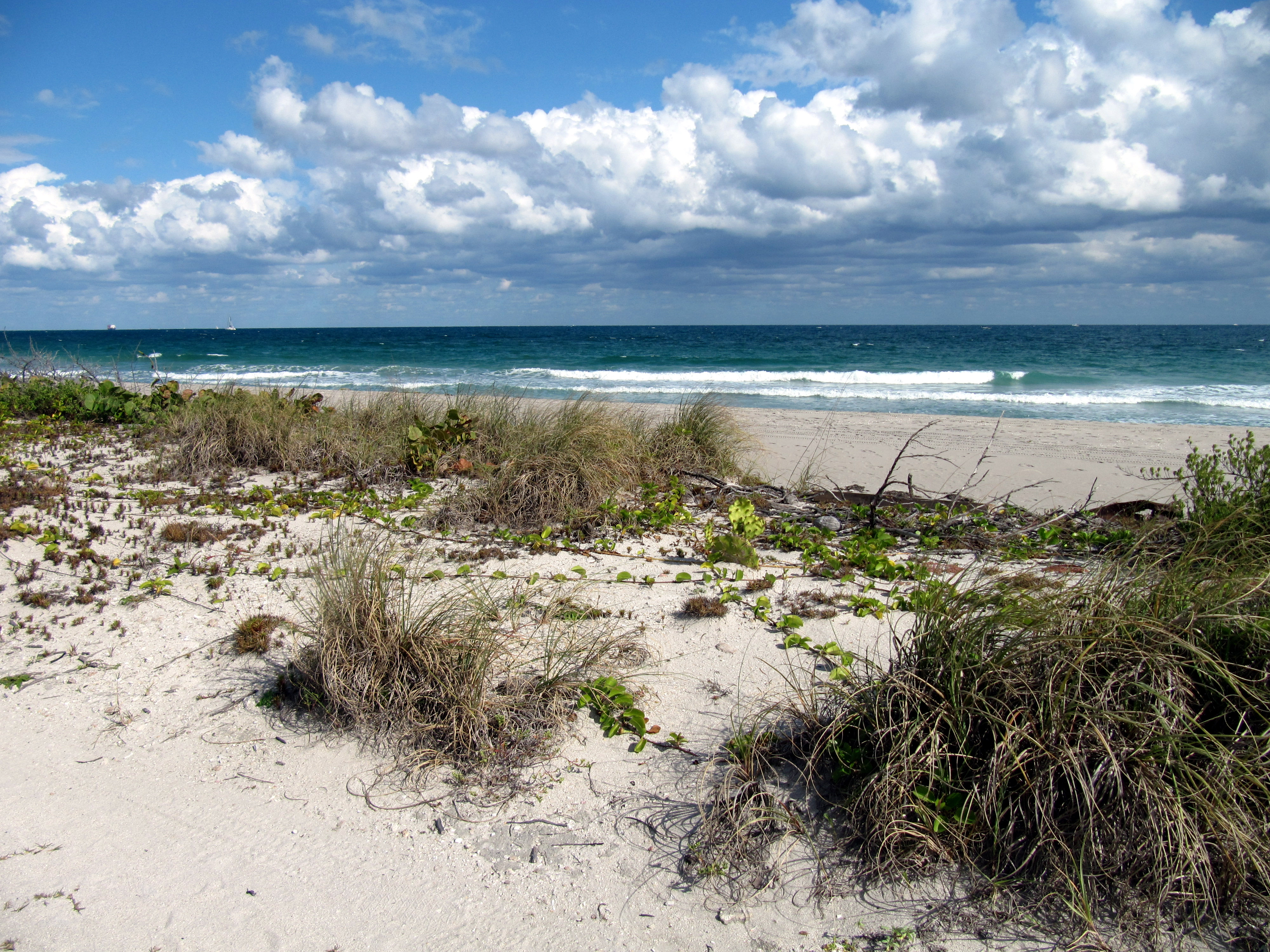
Coastal vegetation in the park

Activities include fishing, surf casting, canoeing, and kayaking, as well as swimming, boating, picnicking, and wildlife viewing. Amenities include a beach, two boat ramps, an education center, picnic tables, grills, and seven covered picnic pavilions. Visitors can rent canoes, kayaks, pavilions, and volleyball nets and balls. The park is open from 8:00 am till sundown year-round. In addition the park includes Whiskey Creek, an inlet which serves as a manatee sanctuary. Within the park is the Dania Beach Erojacks, a popular reef frequented by scuba divers. On July 1, 2016, John U. Lloyd Beach State Park was renamed the Dr. Von D. Mizell-Eula Johnson State Park in honor of civil rights efforts undertaken by Mizell and Johnson during segregation.
