= City of Hialeah Public Library =

System of public libraries in Hialeah, Florida, US

Coordinates: 25.8665°N 80.2865°W

- Location: Hialeah, Florida, United States
- Type: Public Library
- Established: 1958
- Branches: 6

Collection
- Size: 136,660 volumes (2015)

Access and use
- Circulation: 129,727 (2015)
- Population served: 227,395 (2015)

Other information
- Director: Grisel Torralbas
- Website: Official website

The City of Hialeah Public Library is a system of public libraries in Hialeah, FL. The Hialeah Public Library has one central library, John F. Kennedy Library, and five neighborhood e-libraries.

== History ==
In 1924, the Hialeah Woman's Club set their first goal as an organization to open a local library for soon to be incorporated City of Hialeah, and with the backing of Ms. Lua Adams Curtiss, they reached out to the community for donated books. After a book tea, hosted by the Woman's Club in 1924, fifty books were acquired, and the Woman's Club was able to open Hialeah's first "library"; a single room in Ms. J Sommers Garwood's home. Garwood was the President of the Woman's Club during that time. The next year, the Woman's Club received a large donation from a benefactor after her death, and needed to find a larger location for the library. The Hialeah School Board decided to help by donating the use of a portable classroom at South Hialeah Elementary. The library was housed in this location until the hurricane of 1926 severely damaged the building and some of the collection.

After the Hurricane of 1926, the library moved to a room within city hall. The Hialeah Woman's Club was also able to reach out to the community and request more donations to make up for the lost titles. The library was housed in this temporary location for about 20 years. During that time, it was staffed by volunteers and acquired titles only through donation. In the early 1950s, the library moved to its first permanent location, the two-story water tower adjoining the City of Hialeah's fire station. When the library moved to this location, the City of Hialeah began to pay for the utilities, and hired the first part-time librarian.

In 1958, the City of Hialeah had increased to a population of 40,000 and in order to meet the needs of the community, the library moved into a newer and larger location, The Lua A. Curtiss Branch Library. At this time, the library hired its first full-time librarian. The Lua A. Curtiss Branch Library was named after one of the first members of the Hialeah Woman's Club who championed the creation of Hialeah's local library. It is a single story, one room building that, at its opening, housed 14,000 items to be borrowed. In 1965, the Hialeah Public Library grew to include the John F. Kennedy Library, which is currently the main branch of the system. The John F. Kennedy Library went through renovations, completed in 2017, which included new exterior walkways, interior and exterior painting, remodeling of bathrooms, polishing floors, addition of sculpture, art murals, and new furniture and computers.

Starting in 2001, Hialeah added five e-library locations throughout the city. These sites serve heavily populated, underprivileged areas that may not have internet access at home or may not have the transportation available to visit a more distant library branch. The e-libraries share space with a police substation or a community center and are staffed by library paraprofessionals. The e-library locations provide computers for internet access. Customers may request items, pick up reserved items or return material. There is a revolving book collection at each e-library, and programs such as children's story time are offered.

== Branches ==
- John F. Kennedy Library, established 1965.
  - 190 West 49th Street, Hialeah FL 33012
  - Hours: Monday - Thursday: 9:30 a.m. - 8:00 p.m., Saturday: 9:30 a.m. - 5:30 p.m.
- Lua A. Curtiss Branch Library, established 1958.
  - 501 East 4th Avenue, Hialeah, FL 33010
  - Hours: Mon - Thu: 3:00 a.m. - 7:00 p.m.
- West Hialeah e-Library
  - 7400 West 24th Avenue, Hialeah, FL 33016
  - Hours: Mon - Thu: 3:00 a.m. - 7:00 p.m.
- North Hialeah e-Library
  - 7400 West 10th Avenue, Hialeah, FL 33014
  - Hours: Mon - Thu: 3:00 a.m. - 7:00 p.m.
- Wilde e-Library, housed within the Wilde Community Center
  - 1701 West 53rd Terrace, Hialeah, FL 33012
  - Hours: Mon - Thu: 3:00 a.m. - 7:00 p.m.
- Walker e-Library, housed within the Walker Community Center
  - 800 West 29th Street, Hialeah, FL 33012
  - Hours: Mon - Thu: 3:00 a.m. - 7:00 p.m.

Grisel Torralbas is the Director of the main branch, John F. Kennedy, and the five e-libraries.

== Special Events & Collections ==
The Hialeah History Collection preserves, collects, and provides access to resources documenting the City of Hialeah and its history. The physical collection is housed at the John F. Kennedy memorial Library. The collection size is 161,045, and it consists of both primary and secondary sources. The collection spans over 90 years of the city's history and contains audiovisual resources, books, manuscripts, maps, periodicals and photographs. The branch serves 235,563 residents, and annually circulates 65.689 transactions. The Hialeah History Digital Collection provides online access to primary source materials pertaining to the city of Hialeah, such as photographs, documents, manuscripts, books, periodicals, correspondence, and video. The Hialeah Library System welcomes everyone to donate books, documents, photographs, personal or corporate items and contribute to the expansion of the collection and archives. Public contributions are encouraged. The library welcomes donations of books, documents, photographs, personal and corporate libraries and archives in order to contribute to the growth of the collection.

To acquire a Hialeah Public Library card, users need to proof they are City of Hialeah residents by providing a utility bill or recent mail and a valid identification card. Patrons can borrow up to 25 items per library card and loan periods vary.

Loan Periods

- Books - 30 days
- New Books - 15
- Audiobooks - 30
- E-books / Digital Audiobooks - 28
- DVDs / CDs / Video Games - 15
- Laptops - 1 hour

Latino Americans in Hialeah is a digital collection project documenting the experience of Latino Americans in Hialeah through photographs, documents and newspapers. The project was made possible by a grant from the American Library Association and the National Endowment for the Humanities.

The Annual Literacy Fair began in 2003 as a way to promote literacy, health awareness, and positive parenting in the community.

Family Night is a weekly story time program held at the John F. Kennedy library. This program encourages children and their families to participate in readings, crafts and other activities to help build youth reading skills.

Cuentos y Dibujos is a weekly story time program conducted in Spanish and held at the John F. Kennedy library. This program encourages children and their families to participate in readings, crafts and other activities to help build youth reading skills in Spanish.

Preschool Storytime is a bi-weekly story time program held at the John F. Kennedy library. This special story time for children 2–5 years of age is designed to give young children the opportunity to socialize, practice listening skills, reading comprehension and encourage a love of reading from an early age.

Young Poets Society is held at the Wilde e-Library weekly for youth.
