= Fort Lauderdale History Center =

Museum in Fort Lauderdale, Florida

Coordinates: 26°7′9″N 80°8′45.3″W

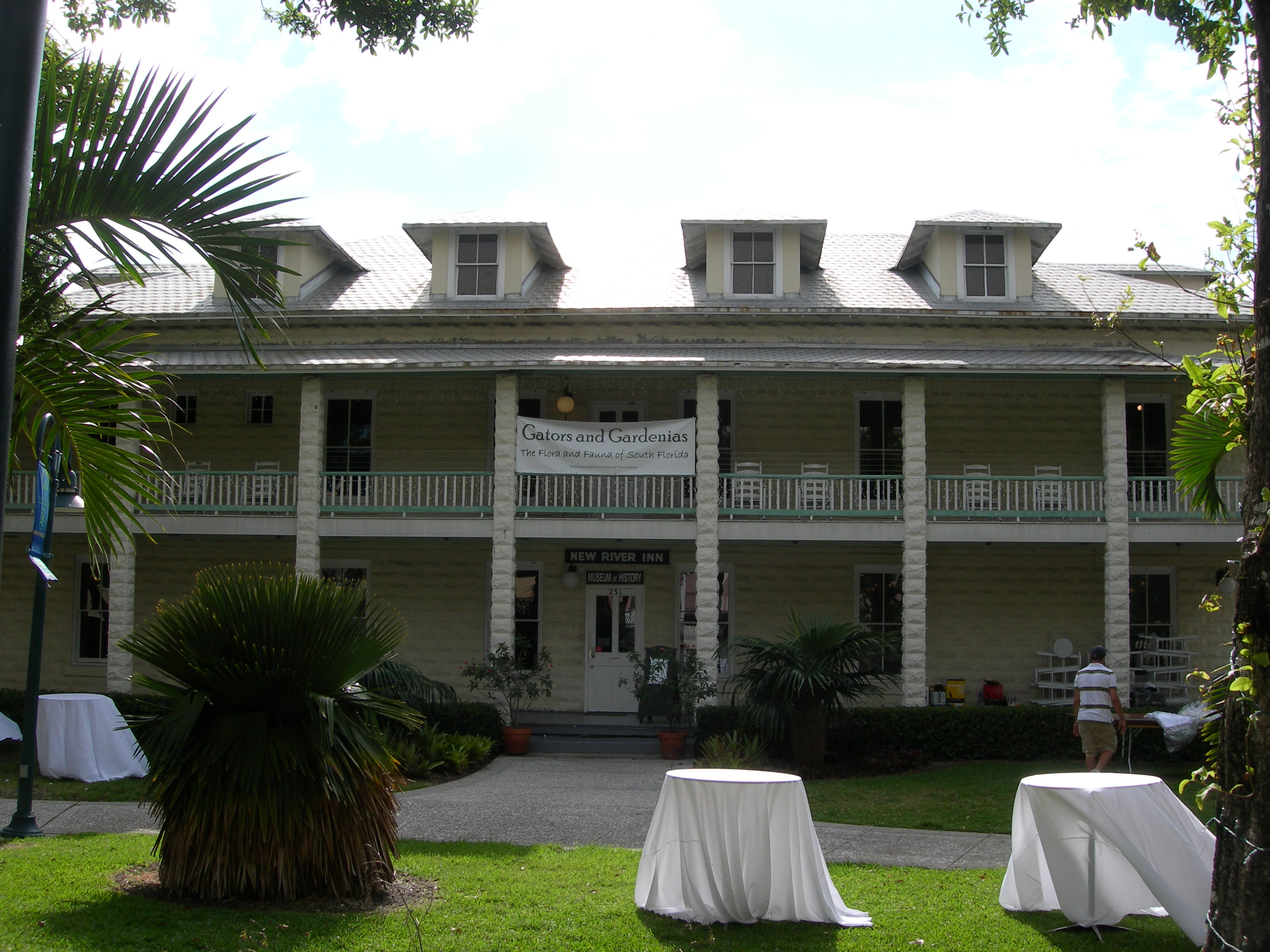
New River Inn

The Fort Lauderdale History Center is a museum complex operated by the Fort Lauderdale Historical Society that is located in Fort Lauderdale, Florida. The complex includes the 1905 New River Inn, a former hotel which now houses the main museum of local history. In addition to dioramas, artifacts, displays and photographs, the museum features one room decorated to appear as a typical hotel room of 1908.

The 1907 King-Cromartie House has been furnished as a historic house museum of 1915, and is open by guided tour. The 1899 Replica School House is also open by tour, and was originally constructed in the 1970s as an American Bicentennial project.

The Fort Lauderdale Historical Society also maintains a public research library and archives of the history of Greater Fort Lauderdale.

The museum was formerly known as the Old Fort Lauderdale Village and Museum.

== Vision ==
The Fort Lauderdale History Center's vision was to bring forth the history of the Greater Fort Lauderdale with research, interactive experiences, and the preservation of historical items. Their "Vision" from the 'About Us" section of the homepage states:

- To serve as stewards of the regions’ heritage in an ethical, responsible manner.
- To preserve and protect structures, collections, resources and rights of all donors.
- To establish a focal point for Fort Lauderdale's current historic district encouraging protection and positive productive use of structures in the area.
- To build interest in, and understanding of, the community through innovative exhibits, educational activities and community events.
- To inspire a greater appreciation of the fore bearers who discovered and built this unique region and to increase awareness of history we build our future upon.

== Hoch Heritage Research Center ==
The Research Center was originally built as a post office annex in 1949, and this warehouse structure has been the home of the Fort Lauderdale Historical Society since 1978. The Hoch Heritage Center is where visitors and local residents come to expand their own knowledge, by perusing the reference library, conducting research in the history files or shopping for photographic prints from our historic image collections. The Research Center has a variety of collections available that include images, manuscripts, and oral histories that keep the history of Greater Fort Lauderdale alive. The research hours at the center are Monday through Friday, 10:00 am to 4:00 pm. A researcher or a curious mind is able to schedule an appointment online.

=== Collections ===
The Hoch Heritage Research Center has numerous collections that focus on artifacts, maps and blueprints, architecture, audiovisual, oral histories, scrapbooks, and newspapers. Two of the larger collections, manuscript and photograph and image, allow you to view those items online.

Manuscript Collections Among our most valuable collections, the manuscript collections encompass a wide variety of subjects and include three major collections: the Stranahan Collection containing items owned by two of Fort Lauderdale's most important pioneer citizens; the August Burghard Collection, containing research material acquired by one of Fort Lauderdale's first historians; and the Dr. James Glenn Collection, containing information regarding his days as a Seminole Indian Agent. We are in the process of creating detailed finding aids for our manuscript collections.

Photograph and Image Collections The Fort Lauderdale Historical Society's outstanding photographic collections contain 400,000 images documenting the history of Broward County. In addition to photographs, the Society also has notable collections of postcards and slides. Most of these images are available for reproduction.

=== Exhibits ===
Permanent Exhibits

There are three permanent exhibits at the Fort Lauderdale History Center: King-Cromartie House, New River Inn Visitor's Room, and Panorama of The Past. The Panorama of the Past exhibit is a three-gallery exhibition aimed to provide an overview of the entire history of the Greater Fort Lauderdale area. Topics and artifacts range from early native peoples and Spanish explorers to the Florida East Coast Railway to the Spring Break craze of the 1960s. Visitors will see lifelike displays, hear the voices of Fort Lauderdale pioneers and step back in time with the help of numerous artifacts and images from the Historical Society's collections.
