= Snow-Reed Swing Bridge =

Bridge in Florida, United States of America

11th Avenue Swing Bridge
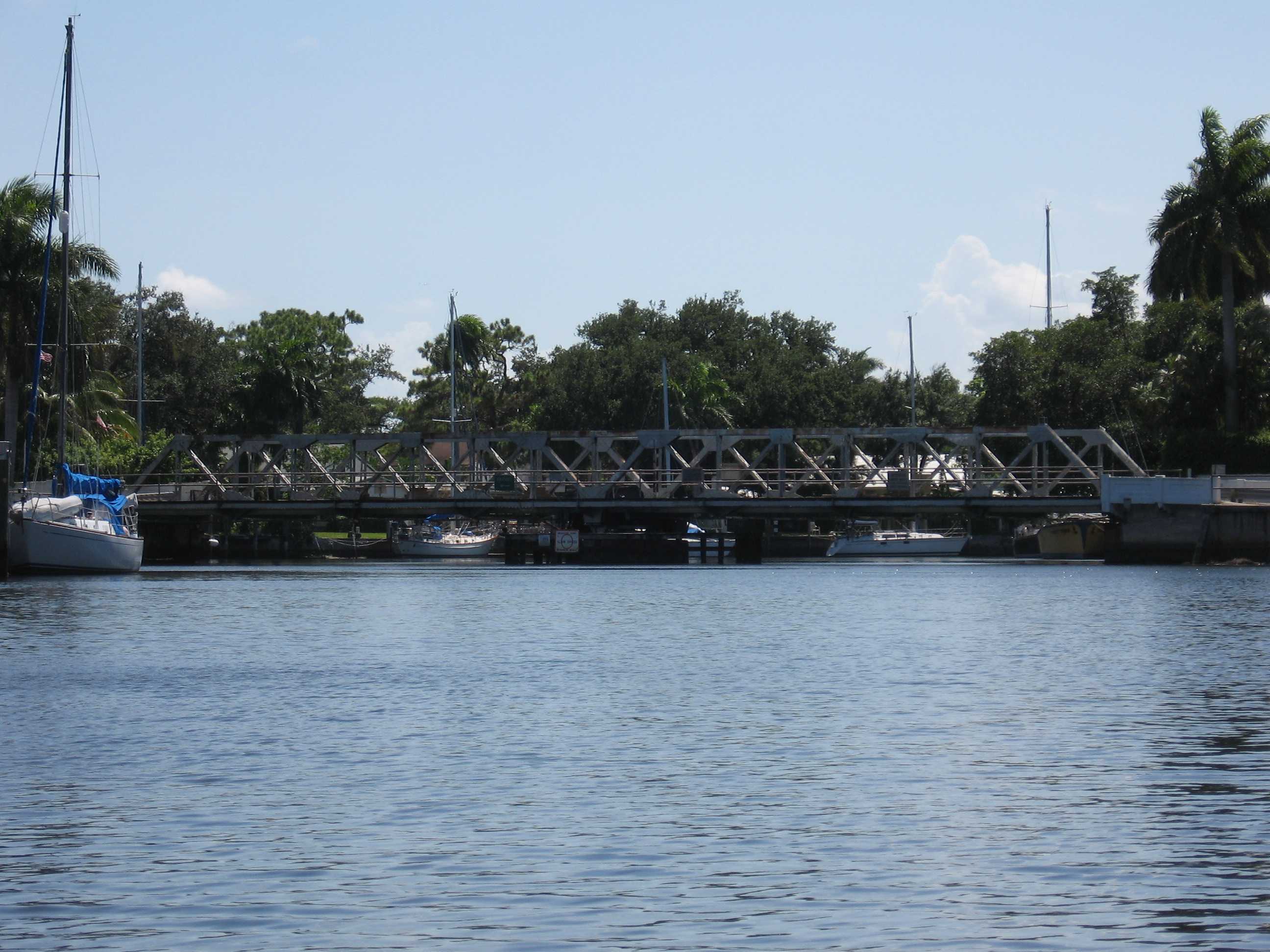
- Coordinates: 26.11581°N 80.15596°W
- Carries: 2 lanes, pedestrians, and bicycles
- Crosses: New River
- Locale: Fort Lauderdale, Florida
- Official name: Snow-Reed Swing Bridge
- Maintained by: City of Fort Lauderdale

Characteristics
- Design: truss swing bridge
- Clearance below: 4 feet (1 m) at mean low water

History
- Opened: 1925

Location
- Interactive map of 11th Avenue Swing Bridge

The Snow-Reed Swing Bridge is one of the oldest bridges in the Fort Lauderdale area, and one of the few remaining swing bridges in Florida. Located between the 300 and 500 block of Southwest 11th (Palm) Avenue in Fort Lauderdale, Florida, the bridge connects the neighborhoods of Sailboat Bend and Riverside Park. In 1989 it was officially renamed and designated a historic landmark .

== Before ==
A wood bridge supported by a single piling used to cross at SW 9th Avenue. In 1916, the old Andrews Avenue swing bridge was moved to cross at 11th Avenue. Locals along the North Fork requested the bridge. This was replaced in 1924 by a new swing bridge, which is still in place.

== History ==
The bridge was constructed from 1924 to 1925. The process of ordering and building the bridge spanned the terms of two different Fort Lauderdale mayors, E.G. Snow and Will J. Reed. Known simply as the old Southwest 11th Avenue bridge it was renamed for these two mayors in 1989.

There is a plaque mounted on the NW bridge abutment wall, which reads:

- City of Fort Lauderdale, Florida
- Officers 1924
- R.G. Snow, Mayor
- Councilmen: Frank Stranahan, Chairman
- Geo. Young, R.E. Dye, J.A. Warren
- Officers 1925
- Will J. Reed, Mayor
- ...
- Jasper Lawson, Clerk
- H.C. Davis, Engineer
- Erected 1924-25 by
- The Champion Bridge Company, Wilmington Ohio

The Champion Bridge Company was a well-known builder of truss bridges. The bridge is a truss bridge with an approximately 100-foot span. To open the bridge for marine vessels, an electric motor drives a pinion gear which engages a ring gear in the base of the bridge. If the electric motor is not working, the bridge can also be opened manually using a large wrench (approx. 8' DEEP socket with an 8' long handle).

The bridge was originally designed only to be operated manually, a gasoline motor was installed in 1930. The electric motor was installed in 1954 but was not operational during the 1955 mayoral campaign when incumbent Mal Carlisle took credit for electrifying the bridge. This blunder cost Carlisle the election.

The Snow-Reed Swing Bridge was designated a Historical Landmark in 1989 by the Fort Lauderdale Historic Preservation Board. In the 1990s because of cross river crime, some residents sought to remove the bridge. The proposal to close the bridge met substantial opposition from neighborhood residents and local preservationists. It is the oldest bridge in the city of Fort Lauderdale and as of 2005 was one of only ten swing bridges remaining in Florida.

== Renovation ==
The bridge was closed for nearly a year for a major renovation and reopened on August 1, 2010. Contractors replaced damaged structural steel, added new railings and grating, upgraded mechanical and electrical systems, and constructed a new tender control house (behind the historical one which was preserved).
