= New River Inn =

- U.S. National Register of Historic Places
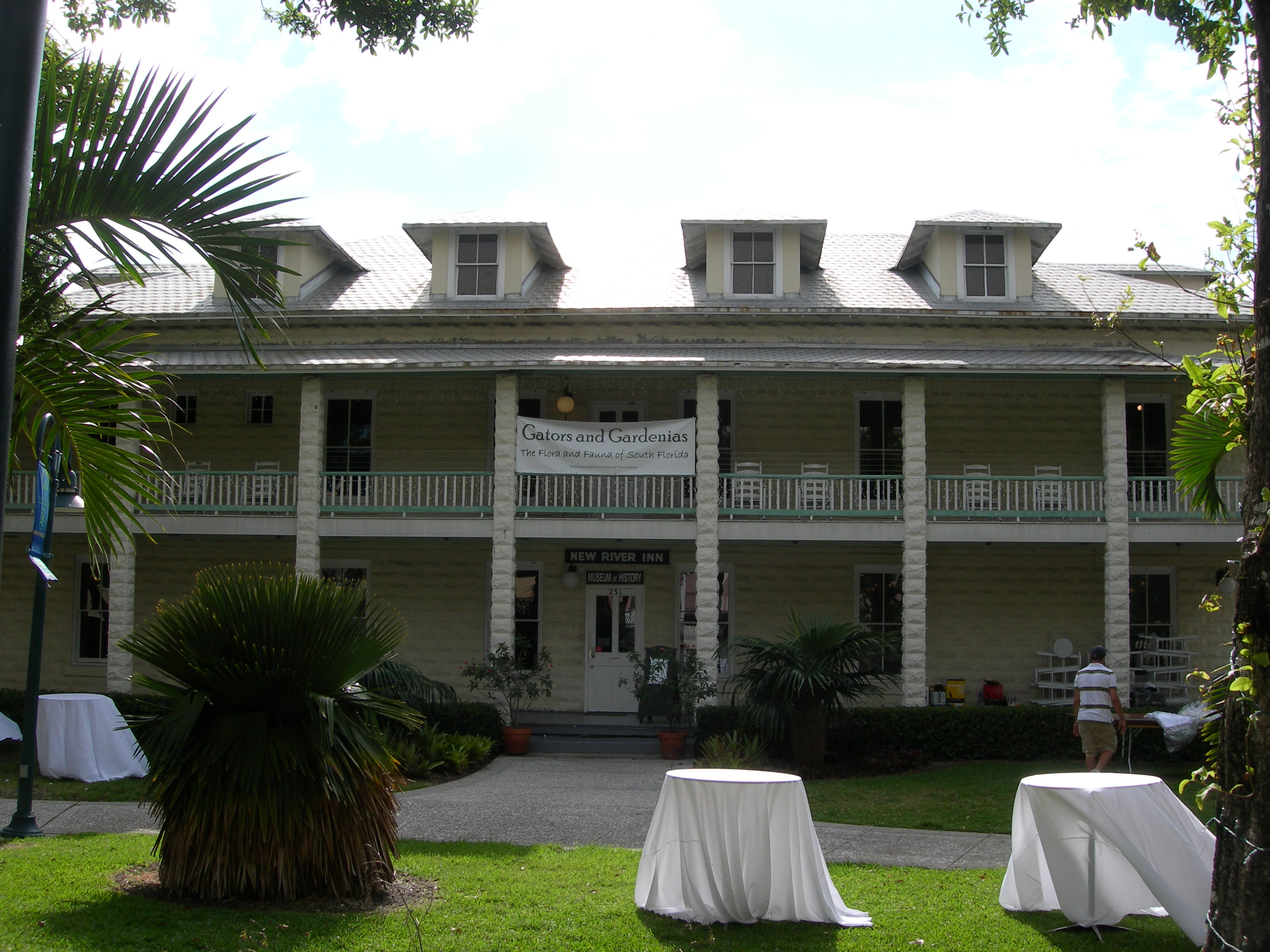
- Location: Fort Lauderdale, Florida
- Coordinates: 26°07′09.03″N 80°08′45.32″W
- NRHP reference No.: 72000303
- Added to NRHP: 19 June 1972

The New River Inn is a historic site in Fort Lauderdale, Florida located at 231 Southwest 2nd Avenue.

The New River Inn was constructed in 1905 by the area's first contractor Edwin T. King. It was commissioned by Nathan Philemon Bryan, a Jacksonville native and US senator. It was one of the first hotels built in the Fort Lauderdale area.

== Building ==
The building was constructed of hollow concrete blocks and sand dredged from the nearby beach. This set the standard for modern construction in the region. It included sewer and irrigation systems along with running ice water and was lit with carbide lamps.

== History ==
The 24-room building served as a hotel from 1905 to 1955. It was listed on the U.S. National Register of Historic Places in 1972.

== Modern times ==
In 1976, the Inn became the first out of the two buildings to house the Museum of Discovery and Science as the Discovery Center, and the first floor housed exhibits about natural history, while the second floor housed exhibits about non-natural history, and the exhibits were obsolete, so the museum was relocated in 1992, to another larger facility a few blocks away.

The Inn now serves as a museum of Florida's past and pioneer life. The museum is owned and operated by the Fort Lauderdale Historical Society. Permanent exhibits include "Panorama of the Past" detailing the history of the Greater Fort Lauderdale area, a hotel room which has been decorated to appear as a typical hotel room of 1908, and the historic King-Cromartie House built in 1907.

The New River Inn is part of a complex of buildings called Old Fort Lauderdale Village that is operated by the Fort Lauderdale Historical Society, The society offers both self-guided and docent-led tours.
