= Old Pompano Fire Station =

Fire Station Museum

The Old Pompano Fire Station, located at 219 NE 4th Avenue, Pompano Beach, Florida, is a museum operated by the Pompano Beach Historical Society. It is housed in the city's first fire station, and contains two antique fire engines, together with photographs and artifacts relating to the history of firefighting in Pompano Beach.
