= Fort Lauderdale Woman's Club =

Historic women's club in Florida

- Symbol: Hibiscus flower Motto: We were your first Colors: Red & Green

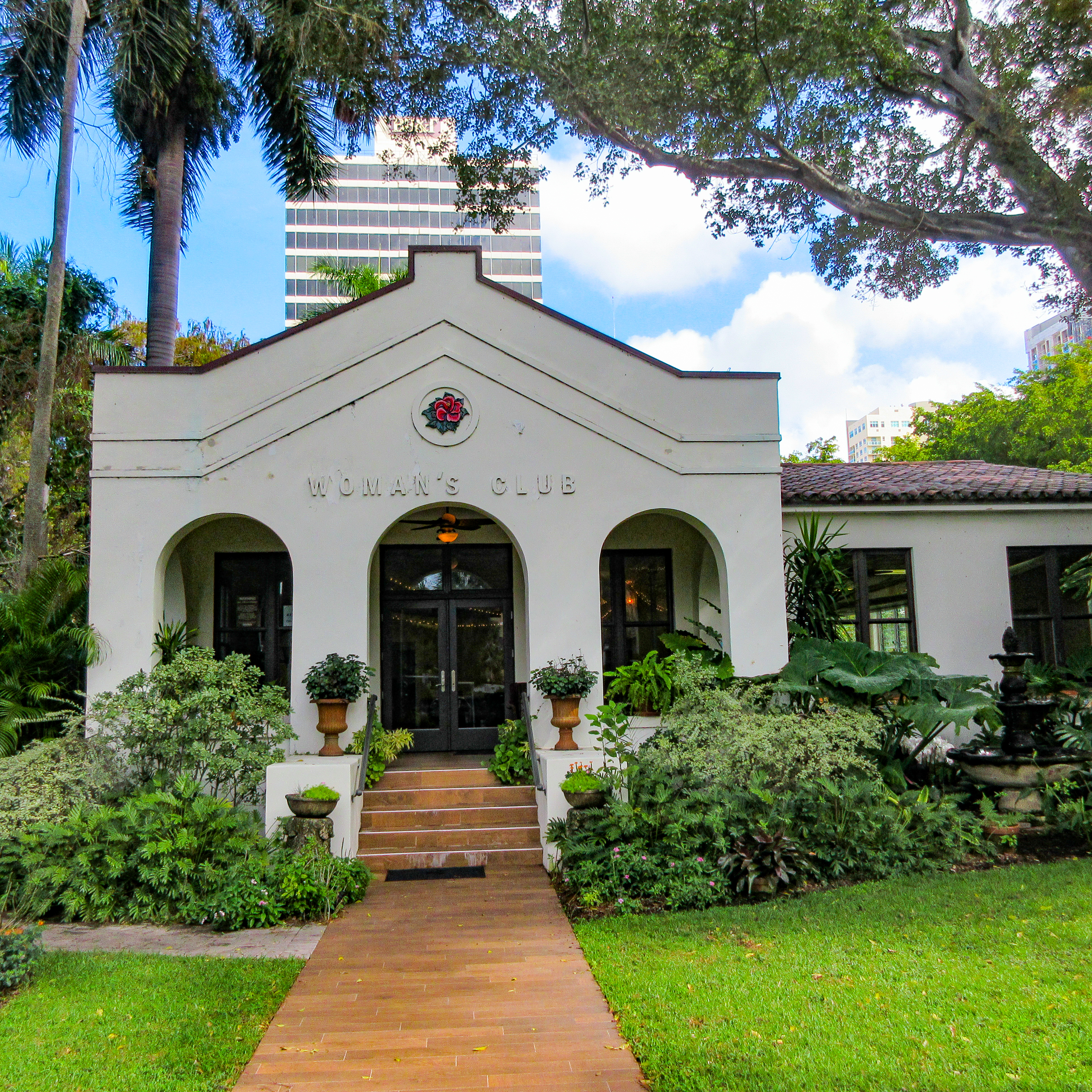
- Street entrance with 110 East building in background

- Location within Florida Location within the United States
- Formation: 1911
- Type: Women's club
- Coordinates: 26°07′18″N 80°08′36″W
- Region served: Broward County, Florida
- Website: fortlauderdalewomansclub.org
- Formerly called: Woman's Civic Improvement Association
- Fort Lauderdale Woman's Club
- U.S. National Register of Historic Places
- Built: 1917
- Architect: August Geiger
- Architectural style: Mediterranean Revival
- MPS: Clubhouses of Florida's Woman's Clubs Multiple Property Submission
- NRHP reference No.: 100003404
- Added to NRHP: February 4, 2019

The Fort Lauderdale Woman's Club is a women's club in downtown Fort Lauderdale, Florida. They completed their clubhouse building in 1917 which the National Register of Historic Places listed in 2019 as part of a Multiple Property Submission.

== History ==
Eighteen women founded what was then "Woman's Civic Improvement Association" in 1911, just before the city was incorporated. The group helped found a number of other civic organizations including Fort Lauderdale's first library, first Girl Scout troop, and first Red Cross office. After a fire destroyed much of downtown in 1912, they helped establish a volunteer fire department with the Board of Trade.

One of the founders was Ivy Julia Cromartie Stranahan, a prominent citizen dubbed the "mother of Fort Lauderdale". Stranahan was a strong proponent of rights for women, Native Americans, and African Americans. She was the first schoolteacher in Fort Lauderdale and the first president of the club. In 1913, Stranahan and her husband, business leader Frank Stranahan, donated the lot for the clubhouse's construction as well as the surrounding land for what's now named Stranahan Park.

1924, the club established a revolving loan to help women attend college. During World War II, the club bought enough war bonds that they had a bomber named after them.

In 1969, former club president Virginia S. Young became Fort Lauderdale's first and so far only female mayor. In 2007 the club elected Alice Sakhnovsky as the club's first African American president.

A homeless encampment had been located at the adjacent Stranahan Park for years. In 2017, the city forcibly cleared the camp following club complaints.

Today the Club rents out the building for wedding receptions and other events and markets the park as a botanical garden. Each January, city officials meet at the club for an informal goal-setting workshop for the year ahead.

== Architecture ==
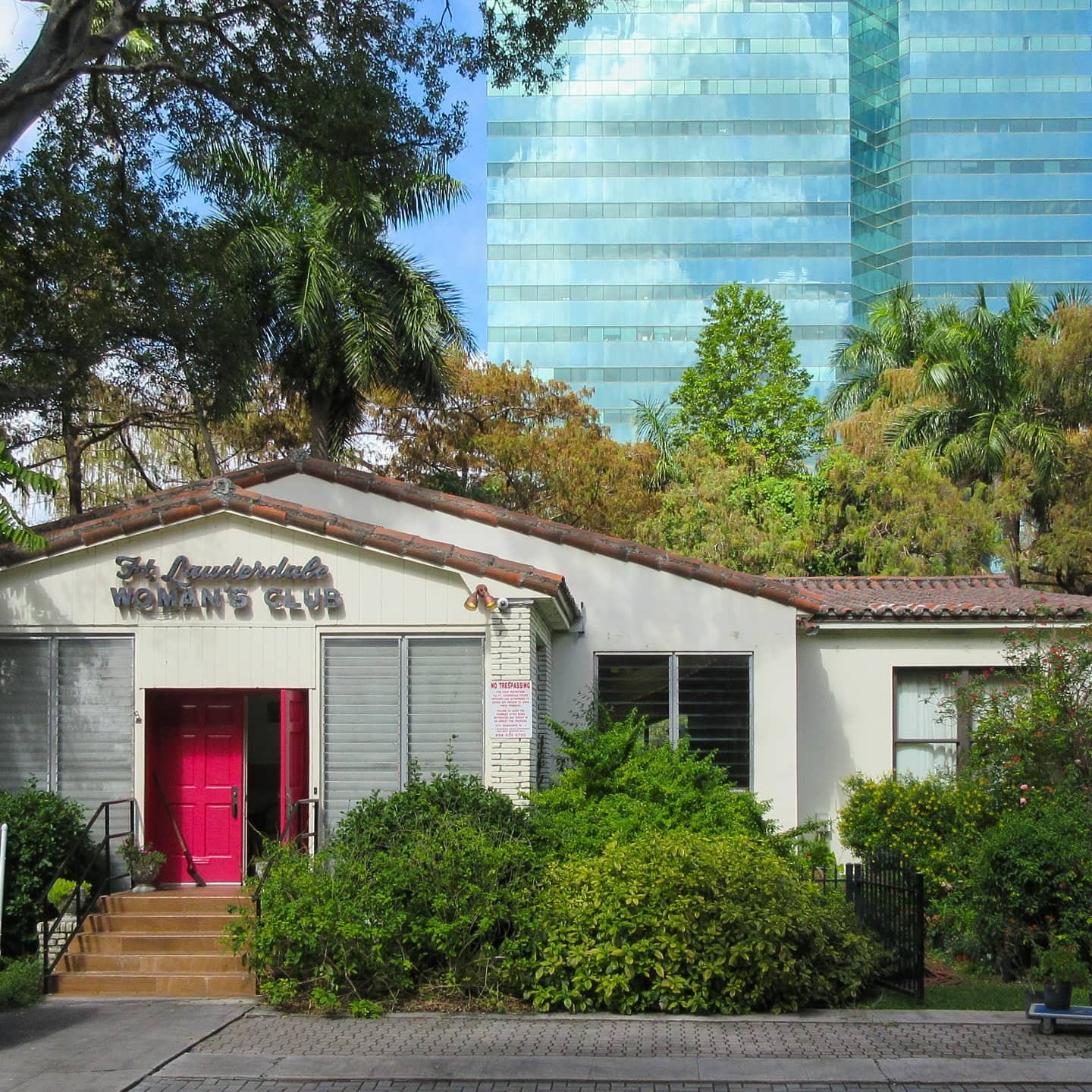
Parking lot entrance with West Marine headquarters in background

August Geiger designed the 1917 building in a Mediterranean Revival style. In 1949, the group built an addition on the back that nearly doubled the size.

The exterior has gray stucco siding with a red barrel tile roof. The front entrance has a three-bay arcaded porch while the side has an enclosed portico that serves as an entrance off the parking lot.

The interior consists of a large meeting hall, kitchen, restrooms, and a smaller meeting space. There is a brick fireplace with a copper hood and Dade County pine floors throughout.

== See also ==
- Stranahan House
- List of women's clubs
- National Register of Historic Places listings in Broward County, Florida
