= Museum of Art Fort Lauderdale =

NSU Art Museum Fort Lauderdale
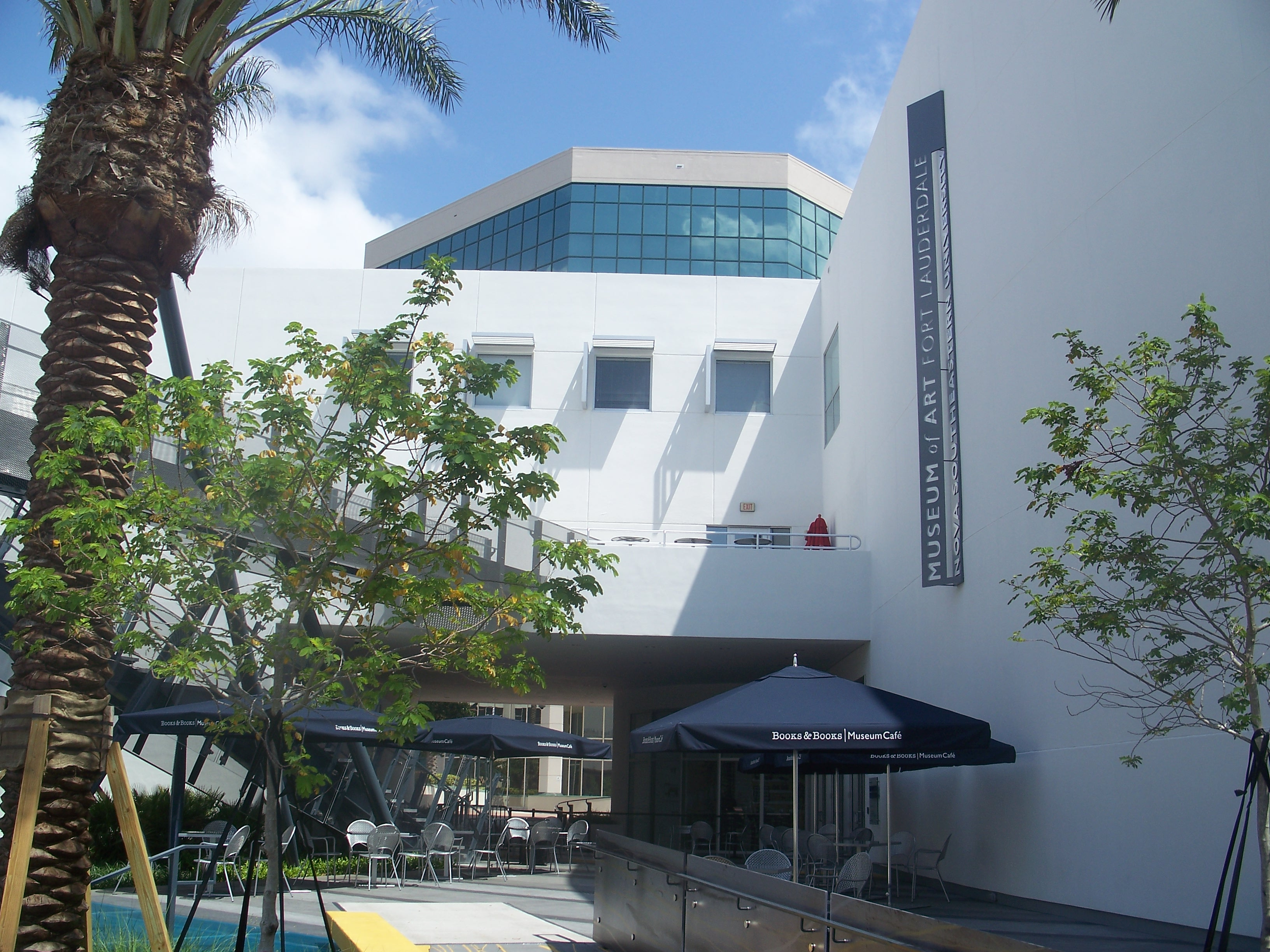

- Location within Florida
- Former name: Museum of Art, Fort Lauderdale
- Established: 1958
- Location: Fort Lauderdale, Florida
- Coordinates: 26.11963°N 80.14288°W
- Type: Art museum
- Collection size: 7,500+
- Director: Bonnie Clearwater
- Website: nsuartmuseum.org

The NSU Art Museum Fort Lauderdale is an art museum in Fort Lauderdale, Florida. Originating in 1958 as the Fort Lauderdale Art Center, the museum is now located in an 83,000-square-foot (7,700 m^{2}) modernist building designed by Edward Larrabee Barnes. The current building was constructed in 1986, with a 10,000-square-foot (930 m^{2}) wing added in 2001. The main exhibition area comprises 21,000 square feet (2,000 m^{2}); a sculpture terrace on the second floor adds an additional 2,800 square feet (260 m^{2}) of space. The museum, unlike major museums in nearby Miami, Florida and Palm Beach, Florida, emphasizes contemporary (20th century) projects, although the collection includes works from the 19th through to the 21st century.

Among its collection of more than 7,500 pieces are a large collection of ceramics and prints by Pablo Picasso, a collection of Latin American and Cuban art representing the contributions of more than 125 artists promised to the museum by Stanley and Pearl Goodman, and North America's largest exhibition of work from the Northern European CoBrA avant-garde movement. Also included in the permanent collection is a significant amount of African and Oceanic Tribal Arts and art of the Americas. The museum's collections are strong in the cultures of South Florida and the Caribbean.

The museum partnered with Nova Southeastern University in 2008.

== Glackens Wing ==
In 2001, the museum expanded, adding the Glackens wing to house a collection of over 500 works from American realist painter William Glackens. The 2,000-square-foot (190 m^{2}) exhibit is the largest collection of his work in existence, and includes both his oldest known (Philadelphia Landscape, 1893) and last completed (White Rose and Other Flowers, 1937) paintings.

== Tutankhamun exhibit ==
In December 2005, a traveling exhibit of relics from the tomb of Egyptian Pharaoh Tutankhamun opened at the Museum of Art. The museum was one of only four venues for this exhibit, touring the United States for the first time in over 25 years. During its four-month run in Fort Lauderdale, over 700,000 tickets were sold.

== See also ==
- List of museums in Broward County, Florida
