= Eula Johnson =

American civil rights activist

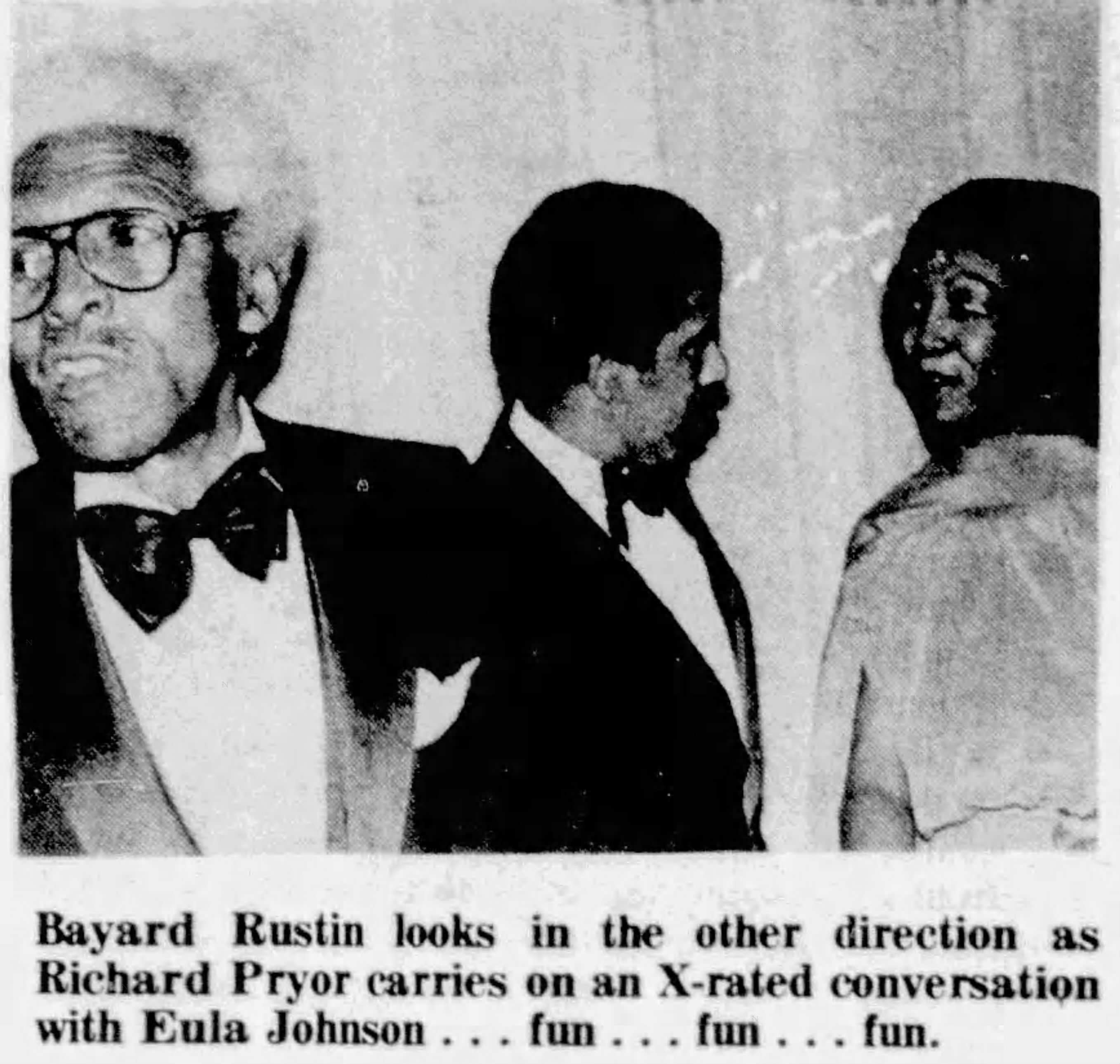
- Johnson (right) with Bayard Rustin and Richard Pryor in 1977
- Born: Eula Mae Gandy Johnson
- Occupation: activist
- Known for: Fort Lauderdale NAACP leader
- Honors: Dr. Von D. Mizell-Eula Johnson State Park

Eula Mae Gandy Johnson (1906–2001) was an American activist in the civil rights movement. She is known for her work to end Jim Crow segregation in public beaches, schools, restaurants in Fort Lauderdale, Florida. She was considered by many to be the "Rosa Parks of Fort Lauderdale."

== Advocacy ==
In 1959, she became the first woman president of the Fort Lauderdale NAACP. In her capacity as president, she filed several lawsuits against public schools to seek equality for black students, as well as fought against separation in public spaces like drive-in theaters. Part of her activism work resulted in the end of segregation at Broward County beaches. Johnson, along with Dr. Von D. Mizell and several NAACP members, organized "wade-ins" at the white only beaches in 1961. The city of Fort Lauderdale sued Johnson for being a public nuisance. After a judge refused the city's request to put a halt to the wade-ins, Broward County beaches became desegregated in 1962.

== Awards ==
- 1988 Community Service Award, Broward Region of the National Conference of Christians and Jews, February, 1988
- Sojourner Truth Award, Fort Lauderdale Club of Negro Business and Professional Women, May, 1988

== Legacy ==
Johnson died in January 2001 at the age of 94.

In 2011, her house, at 1100 Sistrunk Blvd., Fort Lauderdale, became Fort Lauderdale/Broward Branch NAACP headquarters as well as a museum and welcome center for the historic Sistrunk Corridor.

Dr. Von D. Mizell-Eula Johnson State Park in Hollywood, Florida is named after her and fellow civil rights activist Dr. Von Mizell.
