= Ivy Julia Cromartie Stranahan =

American philanthropist

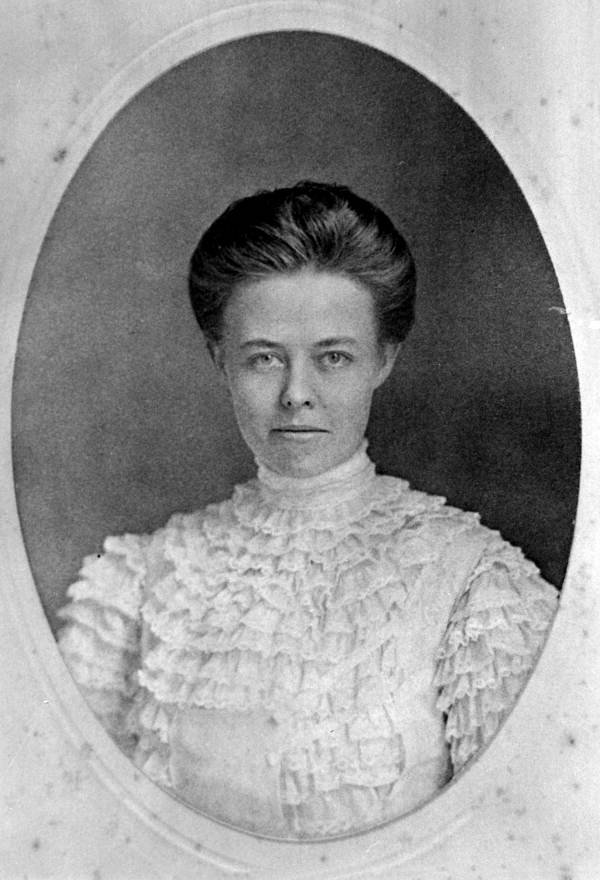
- Born: Ivy Julia Cromartie; February 24, 1881; White Springs, Florida, US
- Died: August 30, 1971 (aged 90); Fort Lauderdale, Florida, US
- Spouse: Frank Stranahan

Ivy Julia Cromartie Stranahan (February 24, 1881 – August 30, 1971) was an American philanthropist and suffragist heavily involved with the Seminoles of Southern Florida. She trained as a teacher initially, but after marrying Frank Stranahan, she settled permanently in Fort Lauderdale. While there, she began supporting the rights of the Seminoles and aiding them in moving to an Indian reservation. She is closely associated with the Friends of the Florida Seminoles, an organization through which she sought to support the education of Seminole children, build homes and eventually to support themselves fully.

== Early life ==
Ivy Julia Cromartie was born in White Springs, Florida, to August and Sarah Cromartie (née Driver) on February 24, 1881. Her father was a teacher based in Central Florida. During the development of the southern part of the state, the Cromartie family continued to move further south. During one part of her childhood, the family lived near a settlement named Owens on the Peace River around 15 miles (24 km) from Arcadia.

They moved onto Juno, Florida, and then later to Lemon City where her schooling was completed. She sought to become a teacher immediately and trained through the summer following graduation. She was assigned as the first teacher to work at the school in the New River settlement (now known as Fort Lauderdale). She arrived prior to the completion of the construction of the school building and stayed with a school trustee and his family for several months. The one-room school opened in 1899 to serve the six families in the surrounding area.

== Life in Fort Lauderdale ==
She met Frank Stranahan shortly after arriving in Fort Lauderdale. He had opened the Stranahan and Co. Trading Post in 1893 to trade with the local Seminoles and also held the local contract for mail delivery. The pair courted, and after she returned to Lemon City at the end of the school year, she accepted Stranahan's proposal of marriage. After taking a trip following the wedding to visit family members, they settled back in Fort Lauderdale and built Pioneer House, later known as Stranahan House. In 1911, she helped to found and initially led the Fort Lauderdale Woman's Club.

After her husband died in 1929, Ivy was left to handle the costs of the Stranahan house. She rented out rooms to those traveling in the area and, from 1939 to 1979, leased the bottom floor to E. J. Blackwell for the installment of a restaurant. Aside from maintaining the house, she continued her personal efforts to advocate for marginalized groups in the Fort Lauderdale area.

=== Seminole advocacy and education ===
Ivy taught English to the local Seminole children, as well as tutoring them in the Bible. While many Seminole adults were initially reluctant to Ivy's teachings, she was the first white woman to build a significant connection with the Seminole community, helping them manage their health, education, and communication with white communities. She became heavily involved in Seminole affairs with the local government and became the Chair of the Indian Affairs Committee of the Florida Federation of Women's Clubs (FFWC). Although she had petitioned for a permanent Indian reservation for the Seminoles, when this was granted in 1917, it was her rival Minnie Moore-Willson who received most of the credit through her Friends of the Florida Seminoles organization. Only a year earlier, Ivy had attempted to remove Moore-Willson from the Indian Affairs Committee.

By 1924, the expansion of Fort Lauderdale had begun in earnest and there was pressure for the Seminoles to move to the approved area set aside as a reservation. She entered their existing camp and convinced members of the group to join her on an expedition to the Dania Reservation. Ivy arranged for the Seminoles to be paid to make the Reservation habitable, and began transporting work parties to and from the location. She arranged for timber to be delivered, courtesy of the Indian Commissioner at Fort Myers. By the end of the year, several homes, a school and an administrative building had been built on the site and all the Seminoles had moved.

She had promised that once moved, they would not need to move again. However, within ten years, this promise was broken as the government was looking to move the Seminoles to the Brighton Reservation. Ivy fought the order, and it was eventually revoked. She continued to work on introducing Christianity into the Seminoles and successfully integrated them into the Southern Baptist Convention. This was following the foundation of a new Friends of the Florida Seminoles organization, which was often confused with the former under Moore-Willson. The new version of the organization named Ivy as Secretary-Treasurer, and she would remain involved with the group for the rest of her life. Together they sought to stem the growing alcohol issue in the Seminoles by educating the women about the problems it could bring.

In the 1940s, the focus had switched to ensuring the ongoing education of the children of the Seminoles. When the Friends of the Florida Seminoles, Florida Foundation Inc. was chartered in 1949 as a non-profit organization, Ivy Julia Cromartie Stranahan was listed as president. The organization grew, allowing it to support the construction of new homes on the reservation. When government support was withdrawn in 1954, Ivy and her Friends society helped the Seminoles to set themselves up as a business, allowing them to organize themselves as the Seminole Tribe of Florida, Inc. in 1957.

=== Civic activism ===
Ivy was a supporter of the 18th Amendment, having been an active member of the Women's Christian Temperance Union (WCTU). She would personally dissuade sales of alcohol to Seminoles through her husband's business.

She was involved in multiple local and state level civic organizations, her most notable contributions focused on suffrage. She helped found the Women's Civic Improvement Association in 1911, which later became known as the Fort Lauderdale Women's Club under her presidency in 1913. She held multiple titles throughout her participation in the organization, including second vice president from 1912 to 1913 and president from 1913 to 1916. This gave her connections to the FFWC, which helped her suffrage efforts gain attention at state levels. She was elected the president of the Florida Equal Suffrage Association (FESA) in 1917 and lobbied for women's suffrage in Tallahassee.

== Legacy and memorials ==
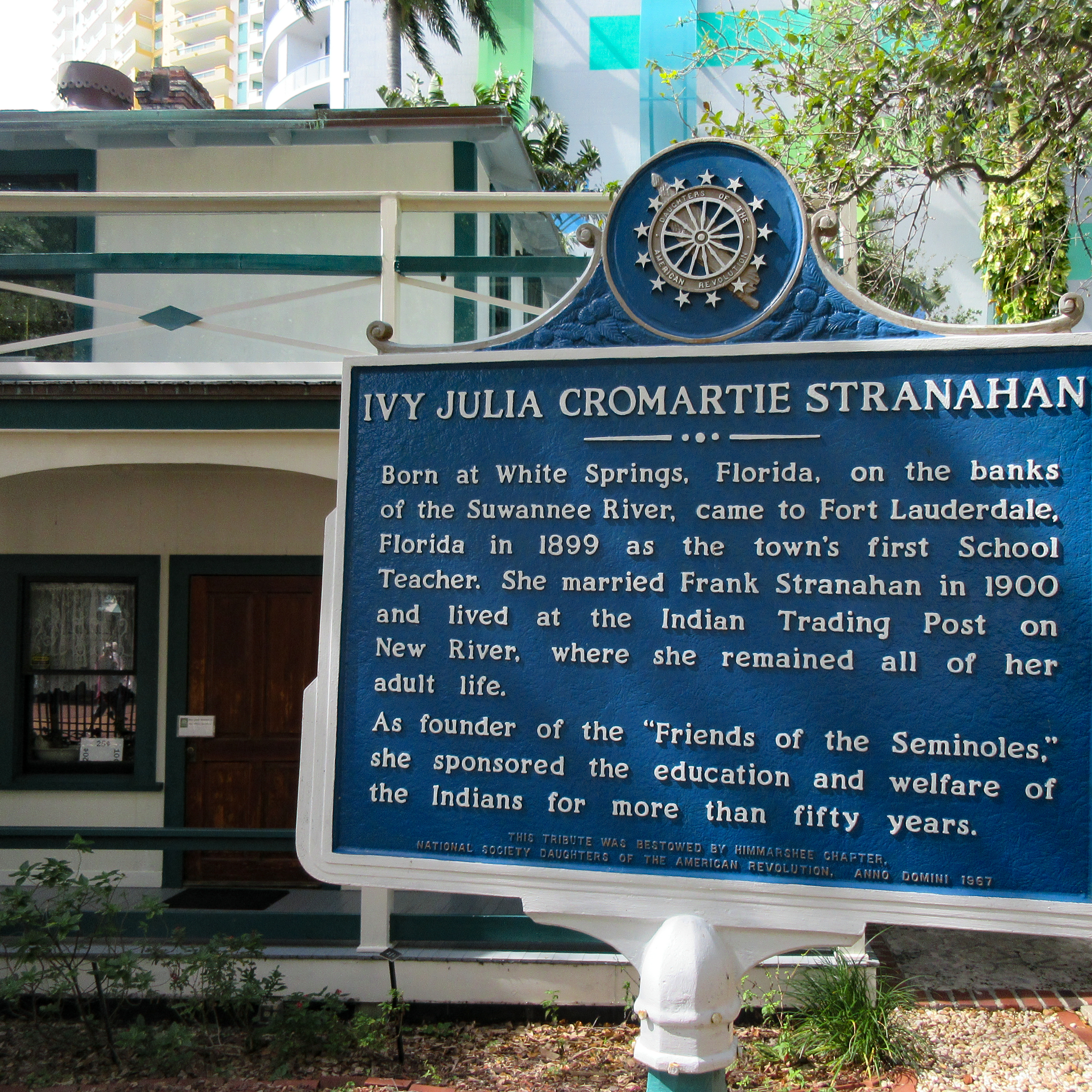
Ivy Stranahan plaque Fort Lauderdale Florida

Ivy advanced to the top ten finalists for the Florida Women's Hall of Fame and was inducted in 1996.

Today, the Pioneer House is preserved as the Historic Stranahan House Museum. The non-profit organization opened the house as a public museum in 1984, which offers educational tours about the history of the house and the Stranahans.

Stranahan High School on the city's N.E. 4th Avenue, which opened in 1953 as an elementary school, is named in honor of her husband, Frank Stranahan.

== See also ==
- List of Florida suffragists
