= Stranahan House =

Historic house in Florida, United States

- U.S. National Register of Historic Places
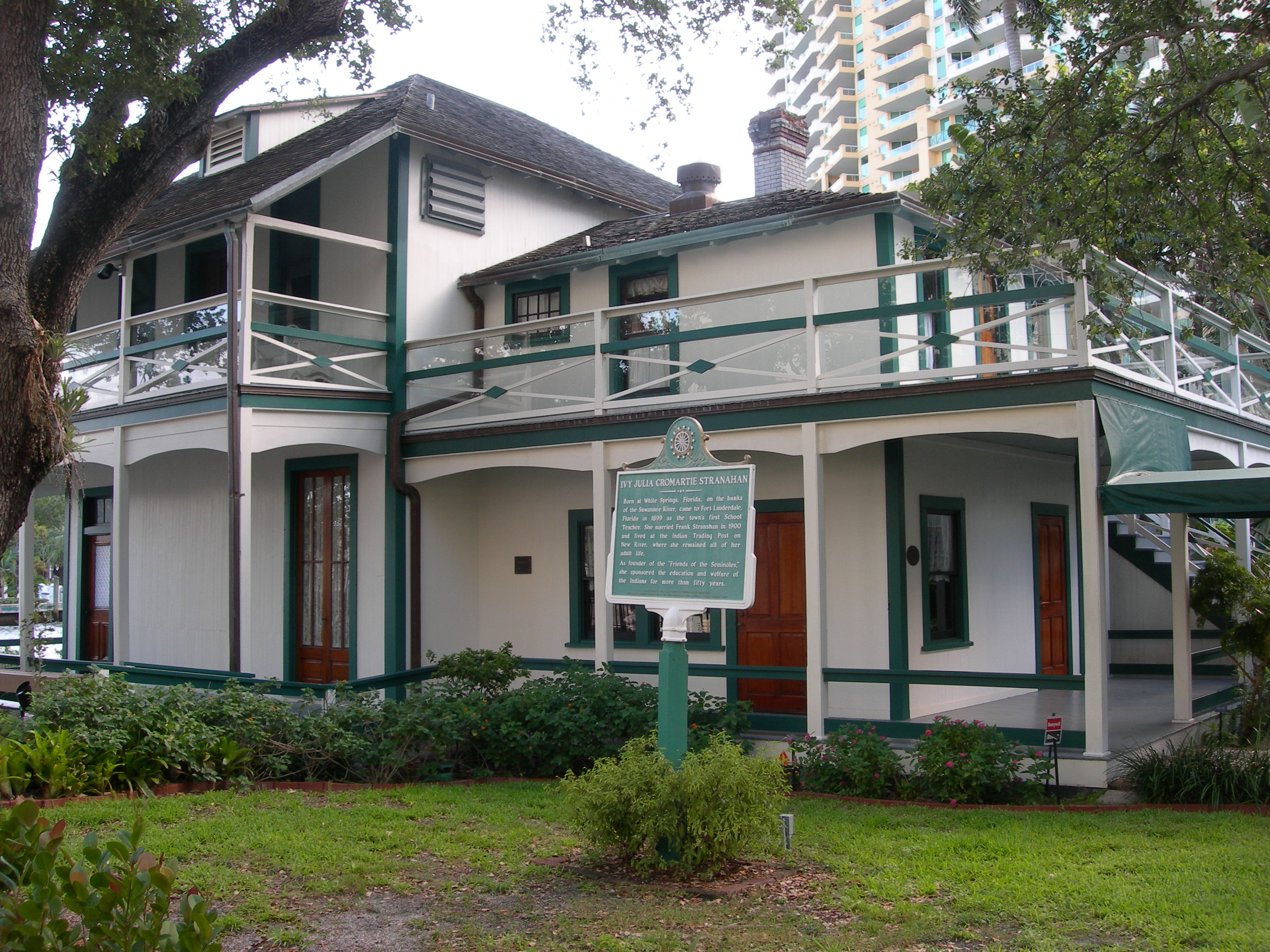

- Location within Florida Location within the United States
- Location: 335 S.E. 6th Ave., Fort Lauderdale, Florida
- Coordinates: 26°7′5″N 80°8′17″W
- Area: less than one acre
- Built: 1901
- NRHP reference No.: 73000569
- Added to NRHP: 2 October 1973

Stranahan House is the home of Fort Lauderdale pioneers Frank and Ivy Stranahan. Built in 1901 as a trading post and converted into a residence for the Stranahans in 1906, the house is the oldest surviving structure in Broward County. It was placed on the National Register of Historic Places in 1973 and today operates as a historic house museum. The House is open for guided tours at 1, 2, or 3 p.m. most Tuesdays through Fridays, and hosts special events throughout the year. Check their website for availability. It is adjacent to the Riverside Hotel.

== The Stranahans ==
=== 1893–1900 ===
In 1893, at the age of 27, Frank Stranahan was hired by his cousin to manage his camp and ferry at Tarpon Bend located on the New River. He would quickly establish his own trading business with the Seminole Indians and gain the reputation of being a fair business man. Arriving via dugout canoes, large groups of Seminole families would camp at the post for days at a time. Eventually, in 1894 Frank would acquire ten acres of land for his own commercial interests and would move the trading post farther west along the river. This property became the focal point of the tiny New River settlement, of which Stranahan was now its postmaster.

By 1899, the community had grown large enough to qualify for a teacher from the county board of education. Eighteen-year-old Ivy Julia Cromartie of Lemon city (what is now Little Haiti) was hired at $48 a month for the job. Community members built the one-room schoolhouse for Ivy and her nine students. Frank and Ivy would come to know one another during the five months Ivy lived and taught at the settlement. They would marry on August 16, 1900, at her family home, and as was customary for married women at the time, Ivy gave up her paid position. Though she gave up her paid position she did not, however, give up her teaching aspirations. She instead turned her attention to the Seminole children, offering informal lessons at the trading post that respected the Tribe's traditions. Her approach quelled skeptical tribal elders' fears and formed the basis for her lifelong friendship with the Seminole people.

=== 1901–1910 ===
Frank built the present day Stranahan House in 1901; the lower floor served as a trading post and the upper floor as a community hall. By 1906 Frank's business had expanded to include a general store and bank, he would also build a new building closer to the Railroad which had arrived in 1896. The old trading post was renovated as a result into a residence for the Stranahans.

As Frank's businesses grew, so did the settlement. By 1910 the Census reports that there was 142 people living in the town. Frank and Ivy would take on many leadership roles in the social and civic life of their developing city, Ivy for instance would help found the Women's Civic improvement Association, later the Woman's club of Fort Lauderdale. Throughout the rest of her life Ivy would be involved with virtually every civic and social cause in the city.

=== 1911–1929 ===
Renamed Fort Lauderdale after the army forts that had been built during the Seminole Wars, the area was incorporated in 1911. Frank donated land for many public projects. With this new name Frank would end up selling the trading company in 1912 to focus on real estate and banking while Ivy would become president of the Florida Equal Suffrage Association in 1916. In 1924 due to her close relationship with the Seminoles, the federal government would seek out Ivy and ask for assistance in persuading the tribe to move to the reservation. She would be successful in her efforts.

In 1926, Florida's land boom had collapsed. Frank suffered extreme economic reverses that were worsened over the next three years by two devastating hurricanes. Adding to Frank's distress was the knowledge that friends and associates who had invested with him were financially ruined as well. On May 22, 1929, deeply depressed and in ill health, Frank committed suicide drowning in the New River in front of his home.

=== 1929–1971 ===
Ivy carried on, making ends meet by renting out rooms of her home and eventually leasing the lower floor to a series of restaurants. She gradually returned to her civic activism. Among her many accomplishments she became a long-term member of the city's planning and zoning committee, successfully lobbied for the Homestead Exemption law, established the Friends of the Seminoles and founded Broward County chapters of the Red Cross and Campfire Girls. Ivy remained in her home until her death on August 30, 1971, at the age of 90. The house was left to the Seventh Day Adventist church, of which Ivy had been a member since 1915. It was purchased by the Fort Lauderdale Historical Society in 1975.

== The House ==
=== 1901–1928 ===
Frank built the two-story structure at its present site in 1901. The lower floor was used as the trading post, and the upper floor as a community hall. In 1906 Frank renovated the house and made it into their home. Bay windows were added, and gas lighting fixtures were likely installed at this time. The upper floor is believed to have remained an open space, accessible via the exterior stairs. In 1913 the house went through a second major renovation, the interior staircase was added and the house was wired for electricity. Water towers were installed in 1915 and it is believed that indoor plumbing was also installed at the same time.

=== 1929–present ===
Following Frank's suicide in 1929, Ivy continued to live in the house, but rented out rooms to visitors and later leased the lower floor to a series of restaurants, the last of which is known as the Pioneer House Restaurant. In 1971 Ivy died, but she left the home to the Seventh Day Adventist Church who registered the home with the National Register of Historic Homes in 1973.

With the last restaurant closed, the Historical Society of Fort Lauderdale bought the house from the Seventh Day Adventists in 1979 and for the next four years a construction project began to restore the house to its 1915 appearance. In 1981 the House became its own corporation, with a separate board of trustees. The house opened to the public in the spring of 1984. The house offers daily tours via their website.

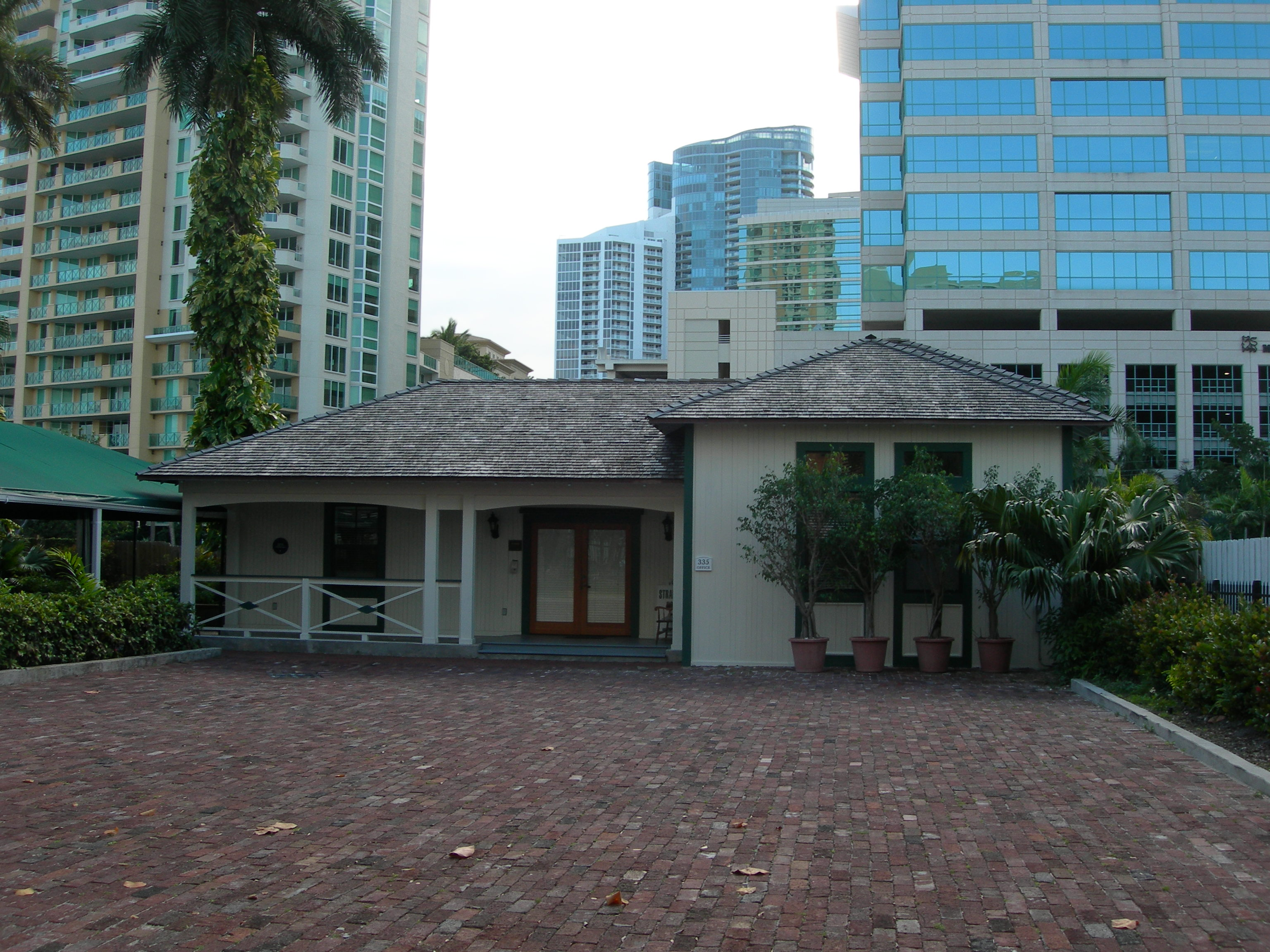
Adjacent house is used as an administration building for Stranahan House.

== See also ==
- Fort Lauderdale Woman's Club: organization led by Stranahan
- National Register of Historic Places listings in Broward County, Florida
