= Fort Lauderdale Fire-Rescue Department =

Fire department of Fort Lauderdale, Florida

Coordinates: 26°8′N 80°9′W

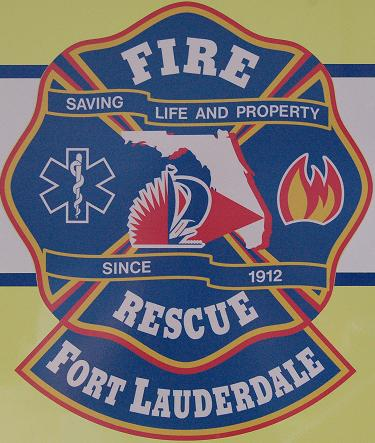

Operational area
- Country: United States
- State: Florida
- City: Fort Lauderdale

Agency overview
- Established: 1912
- Annual calls: 44,387 (2013)
- Employees: 461
- Staffing: Career
- Fire chief: Stephen Gollan
- IAFF: 765
- Motto: Saving Property and Life

Facilities and equipment
- Divisions: 1
- Battalions: 3
- Stations: 12
- Engines: 12
- Trucks: 1
- Platforms: 2
- Squads: 2
- Ambulances: 18
- HAZMAT: 1
- Airport crash: 1

Website
- Official website
- IAFF website

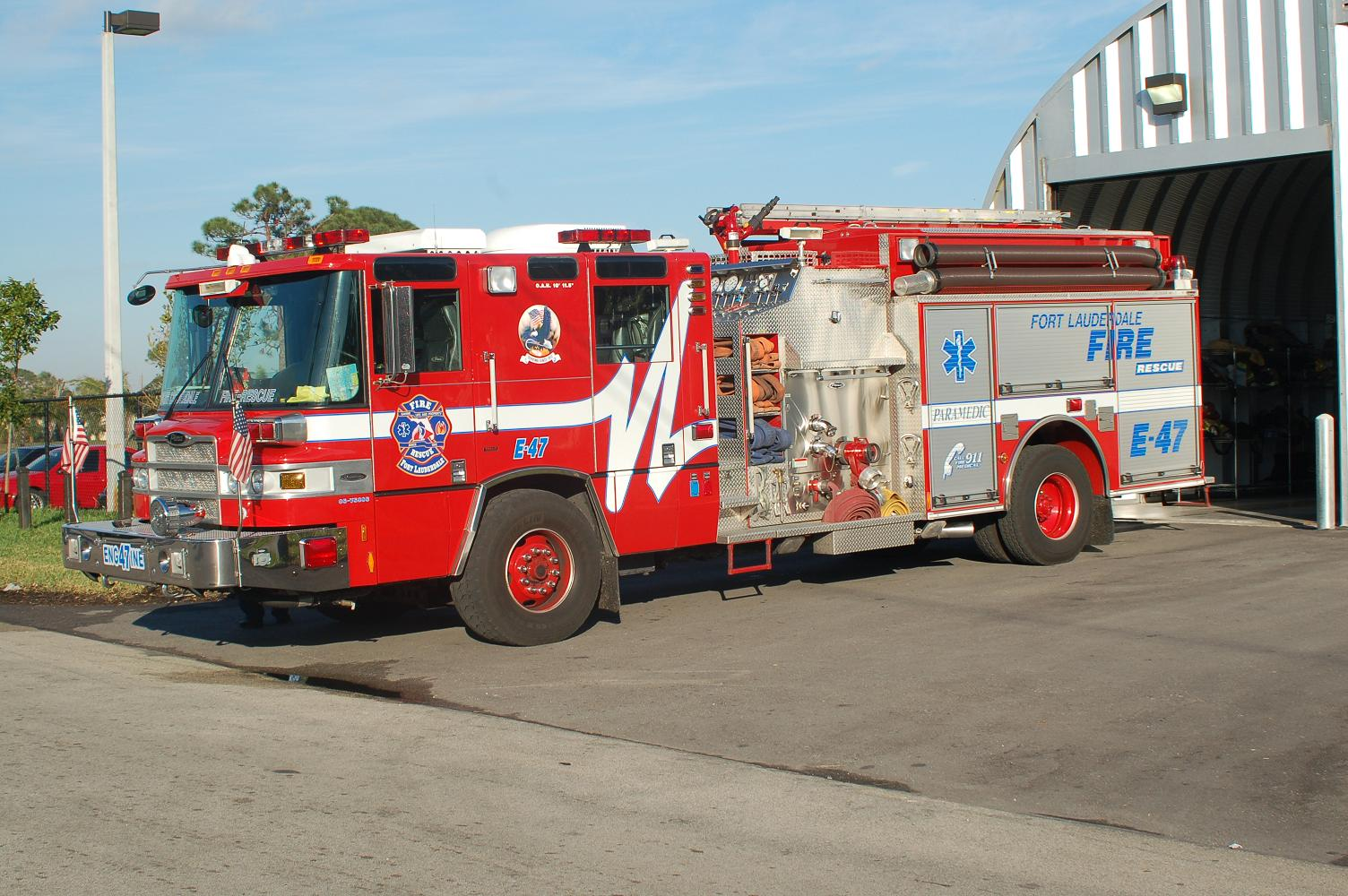
Engine 47 parked in front of Station 47

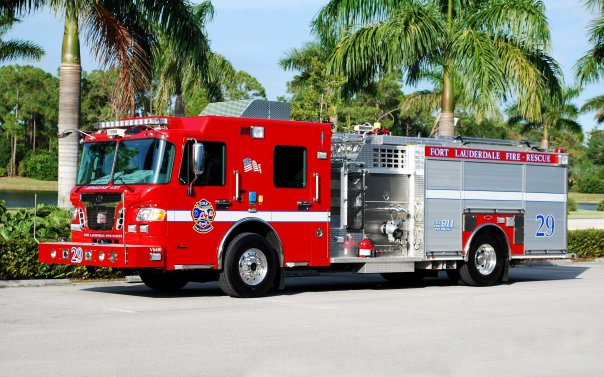
Engine 29 parked in front of Station 29

Fort Lauderdale Fire-Rescue Department is the fire and rescue service provider for the City of Fort Lauderdale, Florida, as well as the cities of Wilton Manors and Lazy Lake through service contracts. Additionally the FLFRD is responsible for ARFF at Fort Lauderdale Executive Airport. In 2013, the department responded to 44,387 calls for service.

== History ==
Fort Lauderdale's fire department was created in 1912 as a volunteer department after a large conflagration destroyed a large portion of what is now the downtown core of Fort Lauderdale. The fire, which destroyed all but three buildings in the previously bustling downtown business district, prompted the city to purchase its first fire equipment consisting of a chemical extinguisher mounted on carriage wheels, and a hand-operated pump. Unique to Fort Lauderdale was that the fire department never had horse-drawn apparatus. The chemical extinguisher was pulled to fires by an International Harvester truck, and the pump was pulled to the fire scene by the firefighters themselves. The pump also carried 500 feet of fire hose, which at times was not sufficient to reach fires in the city, due to inadequate roads.

The first fire station, the second in Broward County, was built in January 1913 on Andrews Avenue and SW 2nd Street and was part of the first City Hall building. The police station, jail, and all other city offices. Prior to this time, all firefighting equipment was housed at a private citizen's warehouse. In 1913, the department and its equipment would be put to use at the first major fire since the great fire of 1912, when the Osceola Hotel burned down. After this fire, the department received its first fire truck, consisting of a used car sold to the town.

When Dr. R. S. Lowry was appointed chief in 1914, he divided the town into four districts. When a fire occurred, each district had a unique whistle that was blown to direct the firefighters to the fire's location. When Milo Sherman was hired as the first paid fire chief in 1917, he was given the blessing of the city to purchase the first formal piece of fire apparatus. At the time, the department was still using the used automobile as a fire truck, and Chief Sherman then purchased an American LaFrance fire engine. Shortly after buying this first engine, Chief Sherman was able to purchase a Brockway truck for $7,500 which carried hundreds of gallons of water, used to fight the numerous brush fires, which at the time were a threat to the city. Chief Sherman also built the department's second station with his own money at 700 S Andrews Avenue. He did this because he felt the city needed a fire station on each side of the New River. This fire station still stands today, and operated until it was sold in 1985 to a private citizen, where it is currently used as a law office.

In 1926 Chief Dooley requested the department build its third fire station at 1022 W. Las Olas Blvd at a cost just over $21,000. This west side fire station, later renamed as station 8, served the department until 2004, when it was closed and its crews moved to the new station 2. It is being renovated as the Fort Lauderdale Fire Museum. Also in 1926 as part of Chief Dooley's improvements to the fire department was the purchase of the department's first ladder truck, a 1926 Seagrave Fire Apparatus ladder truck with chemical equipment, at a cost of $9,500. The final improvement Chief Dooley implemented was the installation of a Gamewell fire alarm system with a central monitoring station, and 40 call boxes to be installed at locations throughout the city. By 1932, the number of fire alarm boxes had increased to over 60, and was further increased in 1937 to 71 fire alarm boxes, with 15 more added to the growing city in 1941.

In 1929, the fire department was affected by the Great Depression, resulting in the closing of two of the department's stations, and the laying-off of firefighters such that only seven remained with the department. This lack of staffing was partly blamed for the catastrophic fire that occurred at Pilkington Yacht Basin in 1935, and after that fire seven additional firefighters were hired. On December 7, 1940, the fire department experienced its first Line of Duty Death, when Firefighter Robert Knight was killed when he stepped in a puddle contacted by an energized high-voltage wire. Firefighter Knight was killed instantly, and another firefighter was severely injured by the electric current as well.

In 1948 the department opened its fourth fire station at 2871 E Sunrise Blvd near the beach, later renamed to fire station 13. The fire station was originally staffed with one engine and one ladder. Also in 1948, the department established its first pension plan for retirees.

On November 28, 1961, the fire department experienced its second Line of Duty Death when firefighter Norman Hastings suffered a heart attack while training near the fire station. He reportedly collapsed face first into the running board of the pumper after complaining of chest pains. He was 45 years old, and a 13-year veteran of the department.

In 1964, the fire department employed 178 firefighters and had a budget of over 1 million dollars. The department purchased its first fireboat, which would be placed out of service due to corrosion only six months later. Also in this year, the fire department opened two new identical fire stations, at 1121 NW 9th Avenue, and 1000 SW 27th Avenue. These two fire stations would later be renamed to station 46, and station 47 respectively.

In 1969, the fire department answered 1,951 emergency calls, and made over 21,000 fire inspections. Eight people were killed in fires, and over 70 were injured that year, with about half of the injuries belonging to firefighters. The fire department was named the best fire preventing department in its class in the entire State of Florida, after being evaluated on fire inspections, fire education talks, and fire prevention methods used in the hoods of restaurant ranges.

In 1970, the department assisted the Fort Lauderdale Police Department in suppressing riots occurring throughout the city. Firefighters had to combat numerous arson fires as well as assist with crowd control. Numerous bullet holes were later found on fire apparatus, and crews used trash can lids to deflect rocks and bottles thrown at them while responding.

Numerous changes occurred in the department in the 1970s, with several improving the health and safety of firefighters. On September 20, 1970, the city hired its first black firefighter, Bobby Glenn, who later retired after serving the department for over 21 years. The city purchased its first set of MSA SCBA breathing apparatus, replacing old canister masks that were rarely worn. Also, firefighters stopped riding to emergencies on the tailboard of fire apparatus and were contained in cabs of apparatus, protecting them from various hazards including falling off the apparatus. Also, in 1971 International Association of Fire Fighters Local 1545 was created, becoming the city's first recognized labor union. In 1975, David DiPetrillo, the first firefighter who was also certified as a paramedic was hired. In 1978, the city hired its first female firefighters, a group of five, many of whom would serve the department for decades. Also in 1979, the department created the hazardous material team to deal with chemical emergencies, the first created in Broward County.

In 1977, the department began to change the color scheme of its fire apparatus. Keeping with national trends citing a study in improved safety and visibility of fire apparatus, the department began purchasing all new fire apparatus in lime green. In 1985, the department realized it would change back to red apparatus, but this was after a large purchase in 1984 of rear-engine hush apparatus made by E-One. The department continued using lime green apparatus until 1998, when the last remaining units were shifted to reserve pieces. These apparatus, served as spare fire engines until they were sold at auction in 2005.

In 1985, the department entered into a mutual-aid agreement with 22 other fire-rescue departments in Broward County. The agreement was the first official document that guaranteed responses by other fire departments for assistance to major emergencies in cities. The document also set minimum standards on staffing, and response requirements for mutual aid responses and this mutual aid agreement was paramount in establishing future relationships between fire departments, such as the one that established the Broward County Uniform Station Numbering system.

In 1988, the fire department began using the Incident Command System as part of its operation at emergency scenes. Also part of this change was the use of RIT teams, which would be dispatched along with a second battalion chief to any working fire in the city.

Chief Jim Sparr is credited with creating the department's first responder system in 1989. Under this system, a Fort Lauderdale Fire-Rescue unit would respond to any medical emergency in the city under a three-tiered system, with Broward County EMS providing patient care, and private ambulance companies providing patient transport to the local hospitals. Chief Sparr also required firefighters to conduct station repairs and other errands including mowing the lawns of fire stations.

In December 1992, the department formed the Technical Rescue Team to respond to dive rescue, and high-angle emergencies throughout the city. Originally named the SHARC team, for Special Hazards and Rescue Company, the team of 27 members were specially trained to handle unusual rescue emergencies that would occur in the city.

In 1995, under the leadership of Chief Donald Harkins, Fort Lauderdale Fire-Rescue placed its first advanced life support (ALS) Engine Company in service, and began providing EMS under a two-tiered system with Fort Lauderdale Fire Rescue providing patient care, and Broward County Fire Rescue providing transport services to the hospital.

A first for the city occurred in 1997, when the city hired its first African American Fire Chief, Otis J. Latin. Chief Latin came to the department after heading the District of Columbia Fire Department, and rising to the rank of assistant chief of the Houston Fire Department. He would prepare the department for a major change that occurred in 1998, when the department transitioned to provide Emergency Medical Services under a single-tier system. This meant that the department would now be the first responder on all medical calls, provide all ALS treatments, and provide all patient transports to local hospitals. This was a large transition for the department, and resulted in the purchasing of 6 new rescue trucks, and the largest hiring class ever of 64 state certified firefighter/paramedics. Several of the Broward County Fire-Rescue employees that had been working in Fort Lauderdale stations were included in this group, with the remainder of Broward County Fire Rescue's employees and all of its equipment being returned to BCFR.

Also in 1998 was the modernization of the fire department fleet. From 1998 to 2000, all fire apparatus was replaced with new Quantum fire apparatus made by Pierce Manufacturing. Also purchased were new rescue units as part of the transition to providing ALS transport services.

On December 20, 1999, the Wilton Manors Volunteer Fire Department was closed, and Fort Lauderdale Fire-Rescue began proving both Fire & EMS services to the cities of Wilton Manors and Lazy Lake from fire station 16. Wilton Manors still retained its fire prevention staff who are responsible for all fire prevention & investigation activities in the municipal limits. Today the department has over 450 personnel and provides fire prevention, fire suppression, fire investigation, rescue, EMS, and ocean rescue services to the people of Fort Lauderdale, & provides contract fire, rescue & EMS services to the citizens of Wilton Manors, Florida and Lazy Lake, Florida.

In 2012 under the leadership of Fire Chief Jeffrey A. Justinak, the department celebrated its first 100 years of public service to its citizens. The International Association of FireFighters (IAFF) Local now is 765.

In 2018, the department hired its first female Fire Chief in its department history Rhoda Mae. Kerr.

== Operations ==
=== Stations and apparatus ===
The FLFRD consists of twelve stations, broken into three battalions. Each shift has an Assistant Chief assigned to be the citywide operational commanding officer. Apparatus naming and numbering reflects the agreed upon terminology used by all fire departments within Broward County, Florida as part of following the Broward County Uniform Station Numbering system. Battalion 2 has Stations 2,3,8 and 47. Battalion 13 has Stations 13,29,49 and 54. Battalion 46 has Stations 16,35,46 and 53.

Battalion 2
Fire Station Number	Address	Engine Company	Ladder Company	EMS Rescue Units	Other units
2	528 NW 2nd St	Engine 2	Tower Ladder 2	EMS Rescue Unit 2, EMS Rescue Unit 202 & EMS Rescue Unit 302	Assistant Chief 2, Division 2 & Support 29
3	2801 SW 4 Ave	Engine 3		EMS Rescue Unit 3	
8	1717 SW 1st Ave	Engine 8		EMS Rescue Unit 8	Battalion Chief 2
47	1000 SW 27th Ave	Engine 47		EMS Rescue Unit 47 & EMS Rescue Unit 247	

Battalion 13
Fire Station Number	Address	Engine Company/Squad Company	Ladder Company	EMS Rescue Units	Other units
13	2871 E Sunrise Blvd	Engine 13		EMS Rescue Unit 13	Battalion Chief 13
29	2002 NE 16th St	Squad 29		EMS Rescue Unit 29	
49	1015 Seabreeze Blvd	Engine 49	Ladder 49	EMS Rescue Unit 49	Fireboat 49 & Fireboat 249
54	3211 NE 32nd St	Engine 54		EMS Rescue Unit 54	

Battalion 46
Fire Station Number	Address	Engine Company/Squad Company	Ladder Company	EMS Rescue Units	Other units
16	533 NE 22nd St (Wilton Manors)	Engine 16		EMS Rescue Unit 16 & EMS Rescue Unit 216	
35	1969 E Commercial Blvd	Engine 35	Ladder 35	EMS Rescue Unit 35	
46	1515 NW 19th Street	Engine 46		EMS Rescue Unit 46 & EMS Rescue Unit 246	Battalion Chief 46
53	2200 Executive Airport Way; Fort Lauderdale Executive Airport	Engine 53, Squad 53 & Engine 88		EMS Rescue Unit 53 & EMS Rescue Unit 88	HazMat 88 & Truck 53 (Airport Firefighting Unit)

=== Special operations ===
In addition to standard response to fire and emergency medical needs for the cities they serve, the department provides many additional specialized response services to their citizens. These services are managed by the department's Special Operations Command which is responsible for the training and management of these specialized teams. In 2020 and 2021 the department began converting special operations engine companies to "squads" which carry additional equipment to support their TRT and Haz-Mat missions at Stations 29 and 53, respectively.

==== Aircraft rescue firefighting ====
The department is responsible for providing aircraft rescue firefighting (ARFF) services to the Fort Lauderdale Executive Airport. The department does so by staffing one airport crash truck, named Truck 53, with two personnel at all times Even though the airport is not required to provide these services under FAA regulations, the department does so to provide an additional margin of safety. The department has responded to many crashes both on and off the airport property since the airport has been in operation.

==== SWAT medics ====
Fort Lauderdale is one of several departments in South Florida that provides Special Weapons and Tactics (SWAT) medics. The SWAT Medic Unit was founded in October 2000 and consists of eight fire rescue department paramedics who are assigned to the Fort Lauderdale Police Department SWAT team. The SWAT medics respond to any incident involving the SWAT team. These specialized medics are equipped and trained to provide emergency medical care in a tactical environment where delivery of emergency medical care to injured civilians and police officers is often delayed to due an active tactical situation.

==== Urban search and rescue ====
Several members of the Fort Lauderdale Fire-Rescue Department participate in the Urban Search and Rescue Florida Task Force 2 team based out of Miami, Florida. The members of the department have deployed to national and international deployments including the September 11th disaster in New York City, Hurricane Katrina, and the Haiti earthquake.

==== Technical rescue ====
FLFRD maintains a technical rescue team that responds from Fire Station 29. The team is responsible special rescue situations such as high-angle and specialized rope rescues, trench rescue, heavy entrapments, and structural collapse rescues. The team responds these specialized rescues both within the city limits and to assist other departments throughout the county and state when needed. Currently the team houses the only live victim search and rescue dog in the county to be considered a member of the department. Although a FEMA asset the canine is also utilized by the department. Unlike the USAR team, which is a federal resource that is on-call to deploy to major disasters, the technical rescue team is for handling smaller local incidents, or the initial operations for major disasters.

==== Hazardous materials response team ====
The Fort Lauderdale Fire-Rescue Department was one of the first agencies in the county to respond with a specialized team to hazardous materials, doing so since 1979. The department maintains the team in Station 88, which is one of four such teams throughout the county available to respond county-wide.

==== Marine rescue ====
Fort Lauderdale Fire-Rescue provides one of two fireboats within Broward County, Florida. The five personnel assigned to Fire Station 49 are responsible for providing both dive rescue services and shipboard firefighting from their station. They respond countywide to provide assistance through the many waterways and canals of the Intracoastal Waterway that passes through the city.

== Fire Administration ==
The Fire Administration Division is responsible for all the support and background functions necessary for the operation of the department. These functions include training, human resources, accreditation, financial management & budgeting, communications management, fire prevention, and EMS administration for the department.

=== Fire prevention ===
The Fire Prevention Division is responsible for all enforcement of the Florida Fire Prevention Code for the city. This includes conducting activities such as fire prevention plan reviews, fire protection systems testing, and annual fire inspections and re-inspections for the City of Fort Lauderdale.

==== Fire Investigation Unit ====
Within the Fire Prevention Division is the department's fire investigation unit. Five fire inspectors, lieutenants, and captains within the division are trained to perform origin & cause fire investigation duties for structure, vehicle, and other fires that occur within the jurisdictional limits of the fire department. The investigators are all Certified Fire and Explosion Investigators (CFEI) by the National Association of Fire Investigators. In addition, many have been certified as expert witnesses in court for their knowledge and expertise. In the case of an incendiary fire determination, the department's investigators work closely with Fort Lauderdale Police Department detectives, the Florida State Fire Marshal's Office Arson Investigators, and/or the Bureau of Alcohol, Tobacco, Firearms and Explosives

== Ocean rescue ==
The department also is responsible for providing ocean rescue lifeguard services to the city. Fort Lauderdale Ocean Rescue supervises three miles of continuous public beach along the coastline. In the guarded areas of the beach, there are 20 permanently staffed lifeguard towers spaced approximately 300 yards (270 m) apart. There are also 10 temporary stands that are used during the peak season, special events and holidays.

== Gallery ==
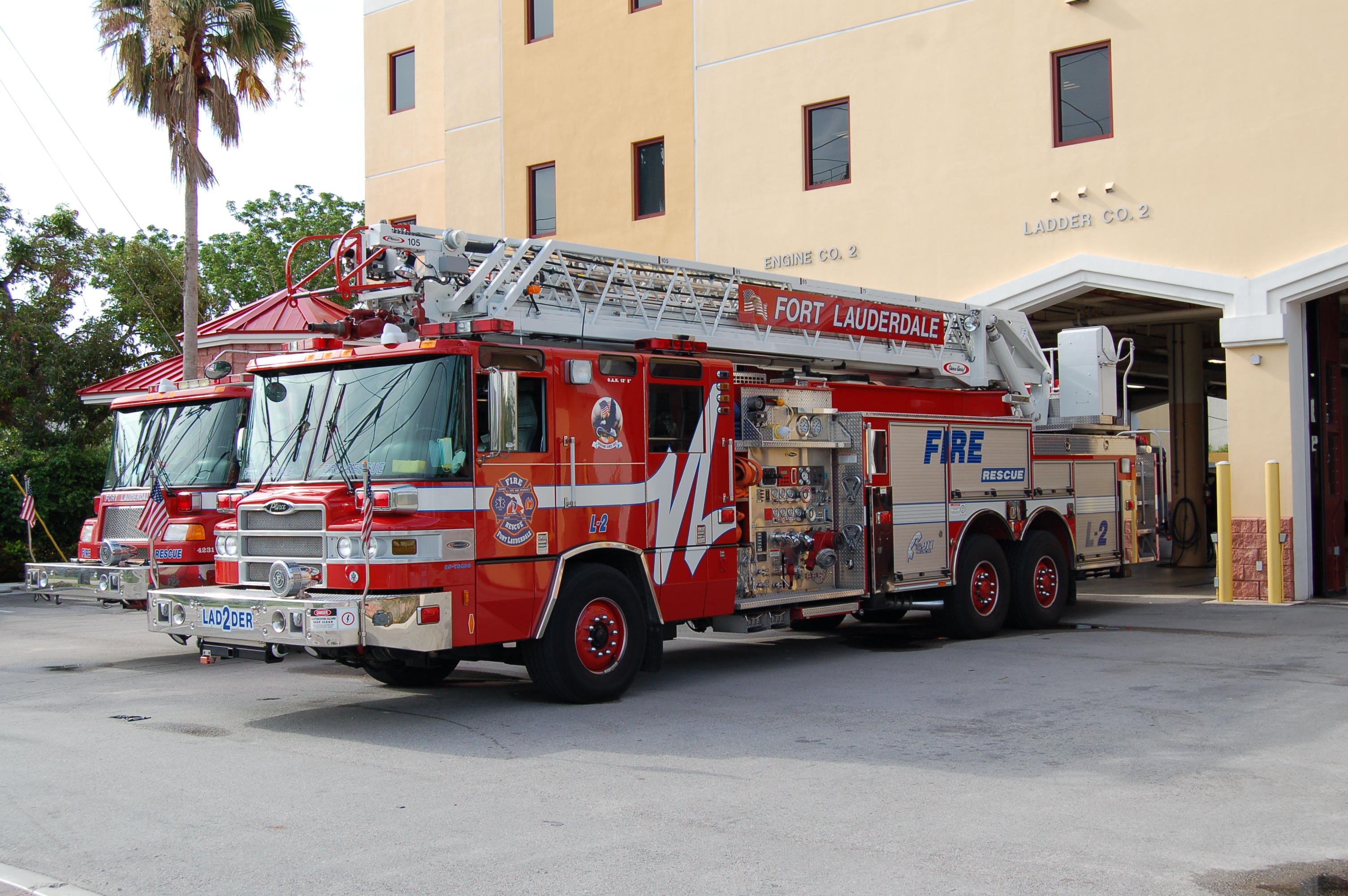
Former Ladder 2 (now reserve) parked in front of Station 2

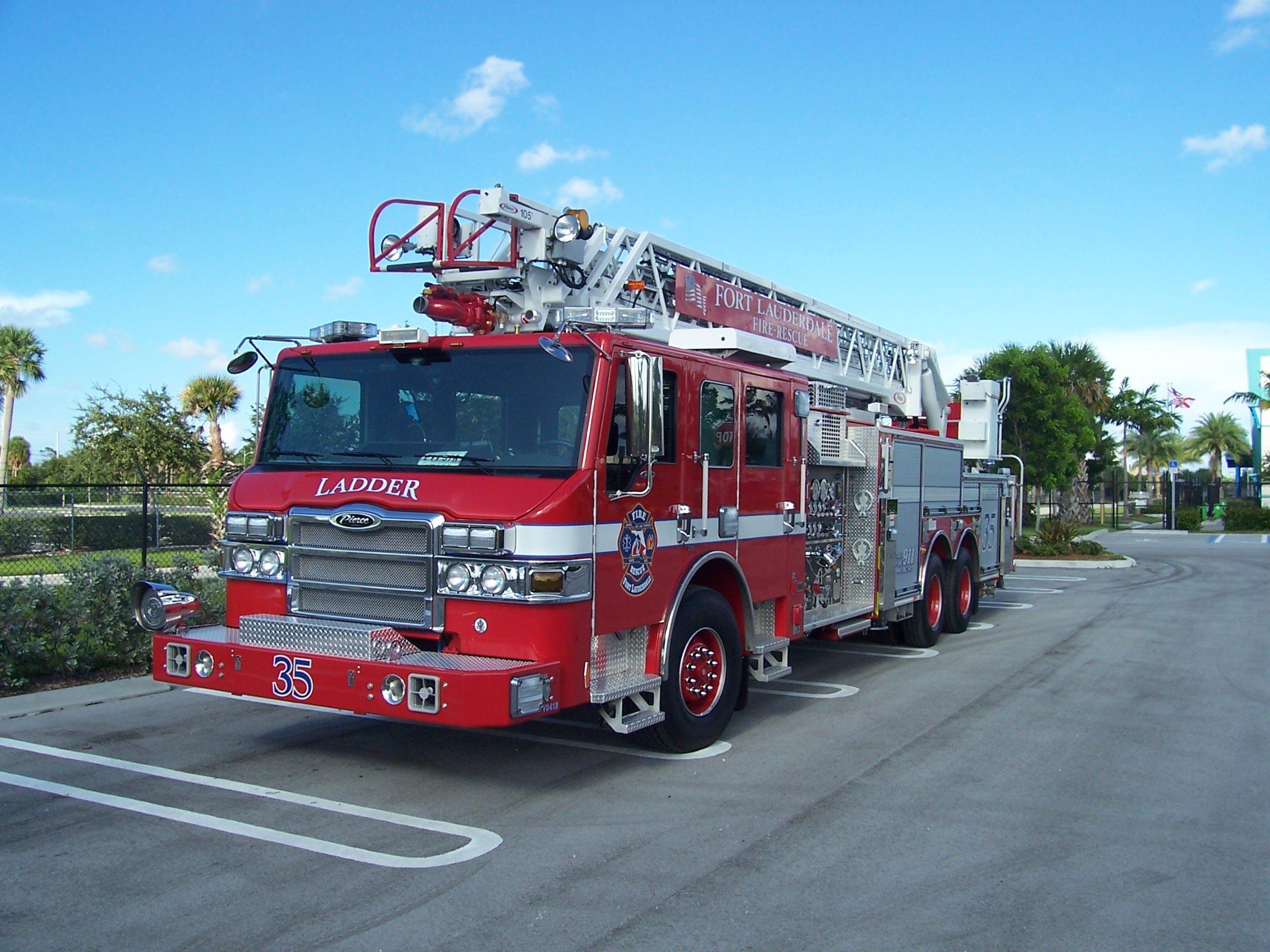
Ladder 35

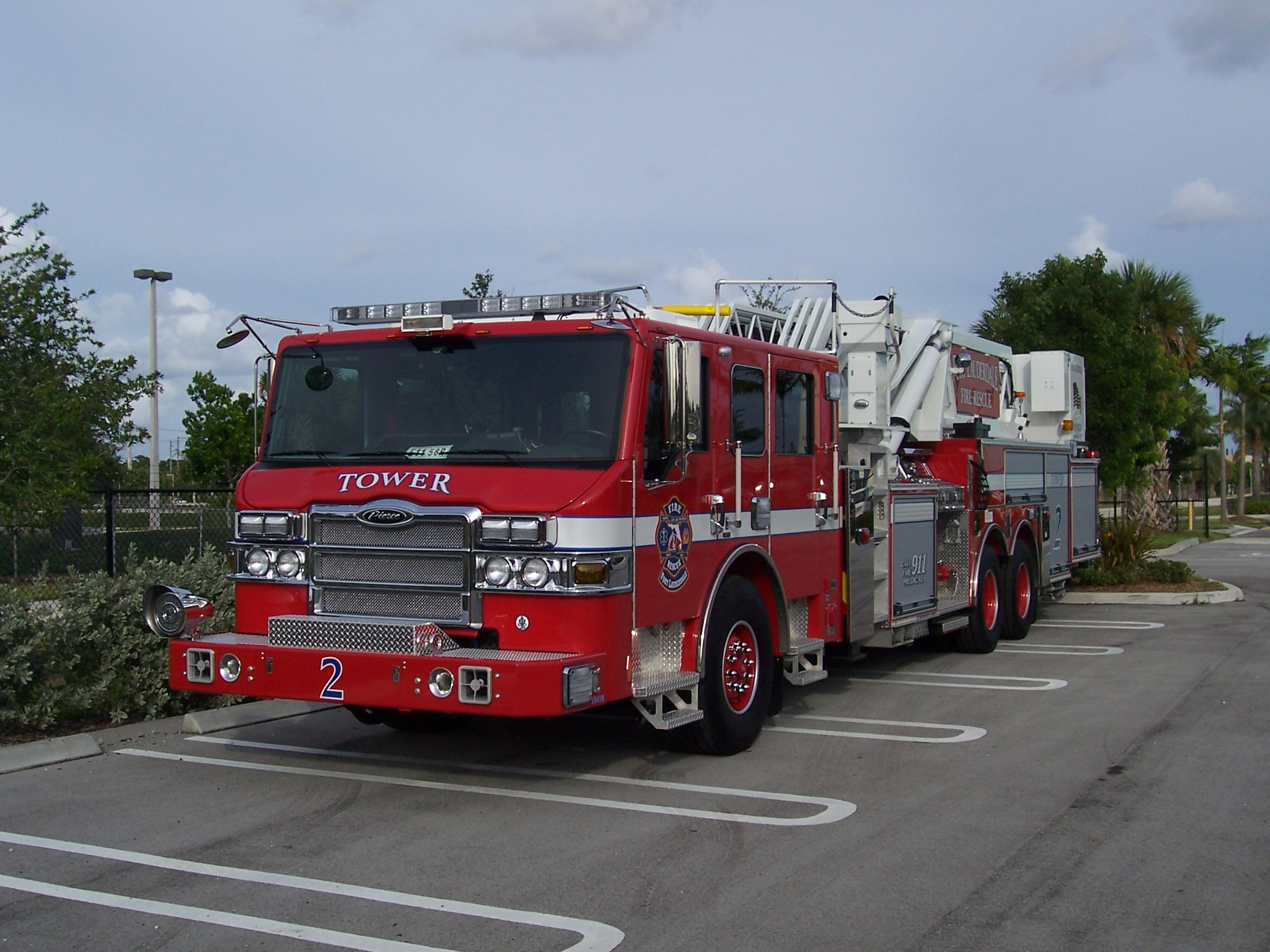
Tower 2

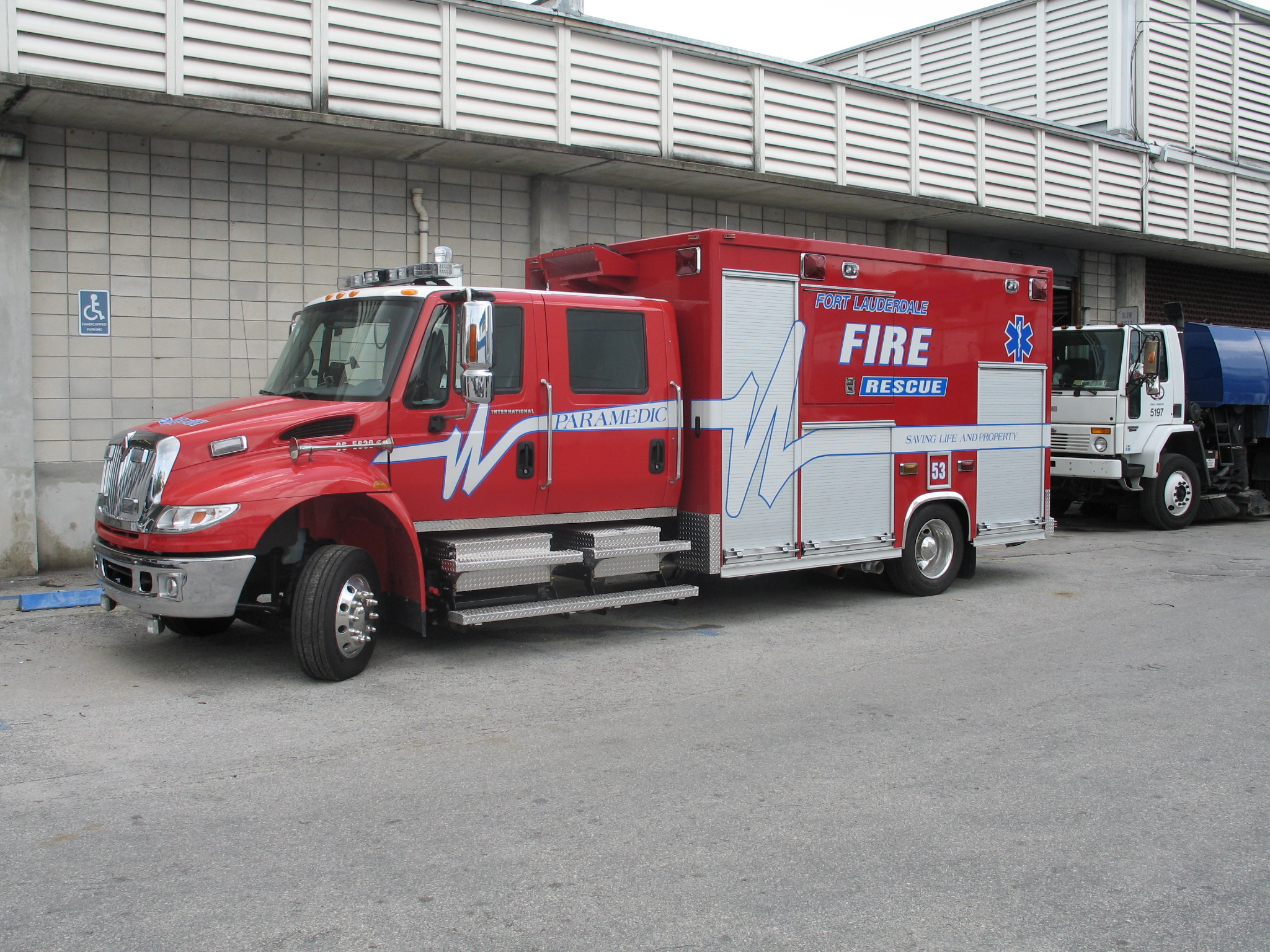
Rescue 53

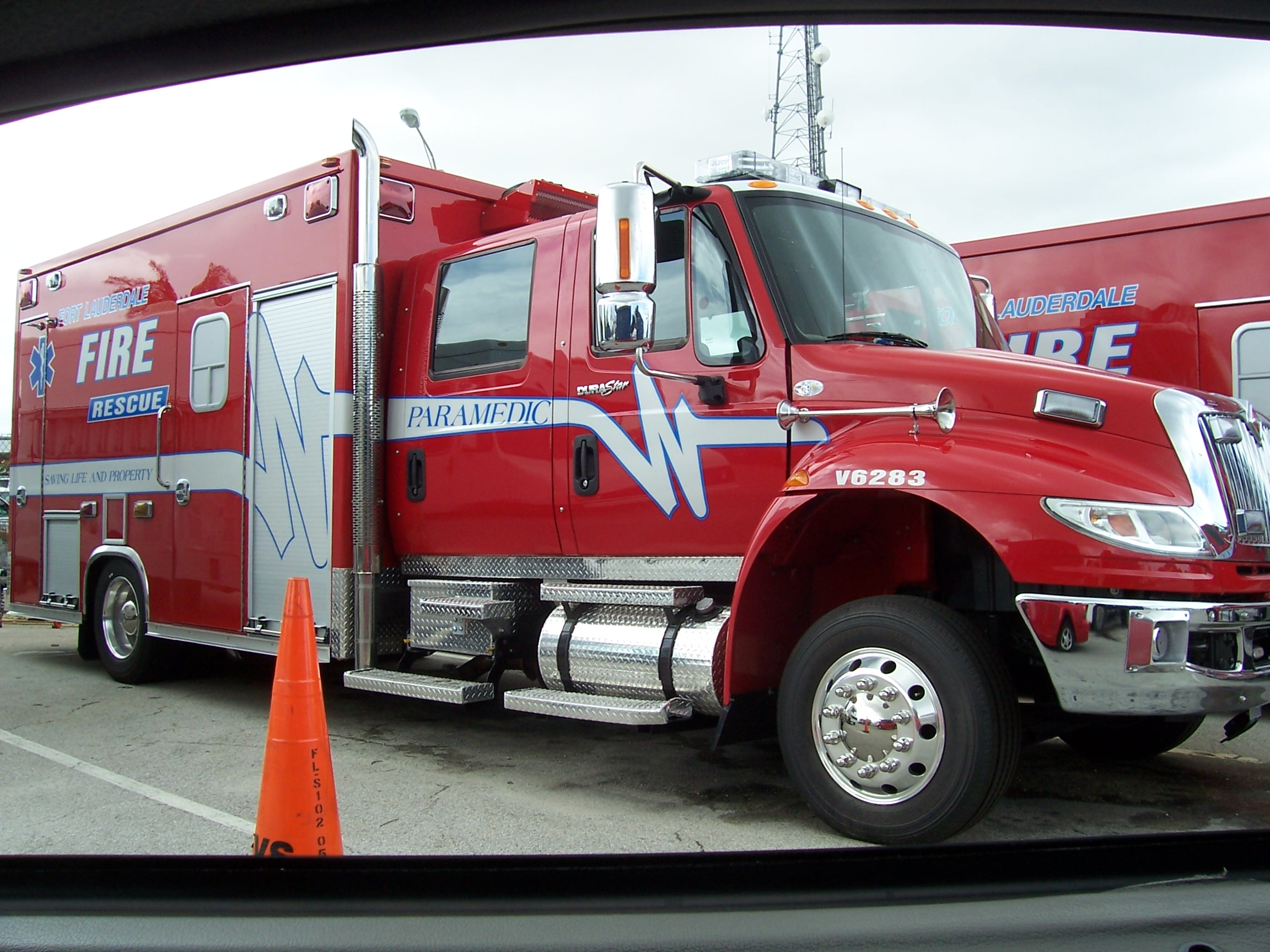
Rescue

HazMat 88

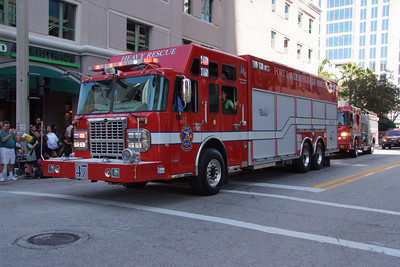
Squad 47

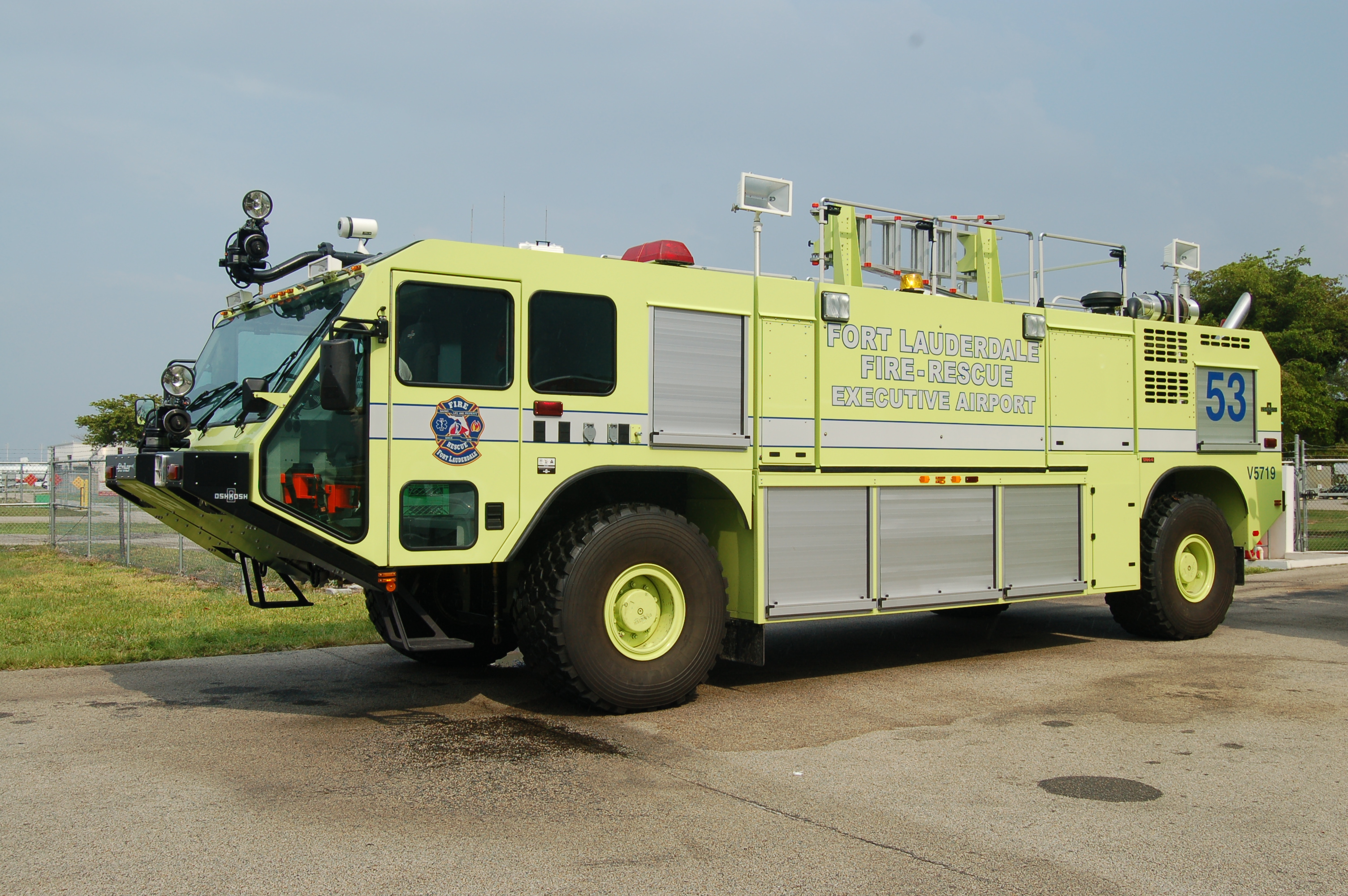
Truck 53

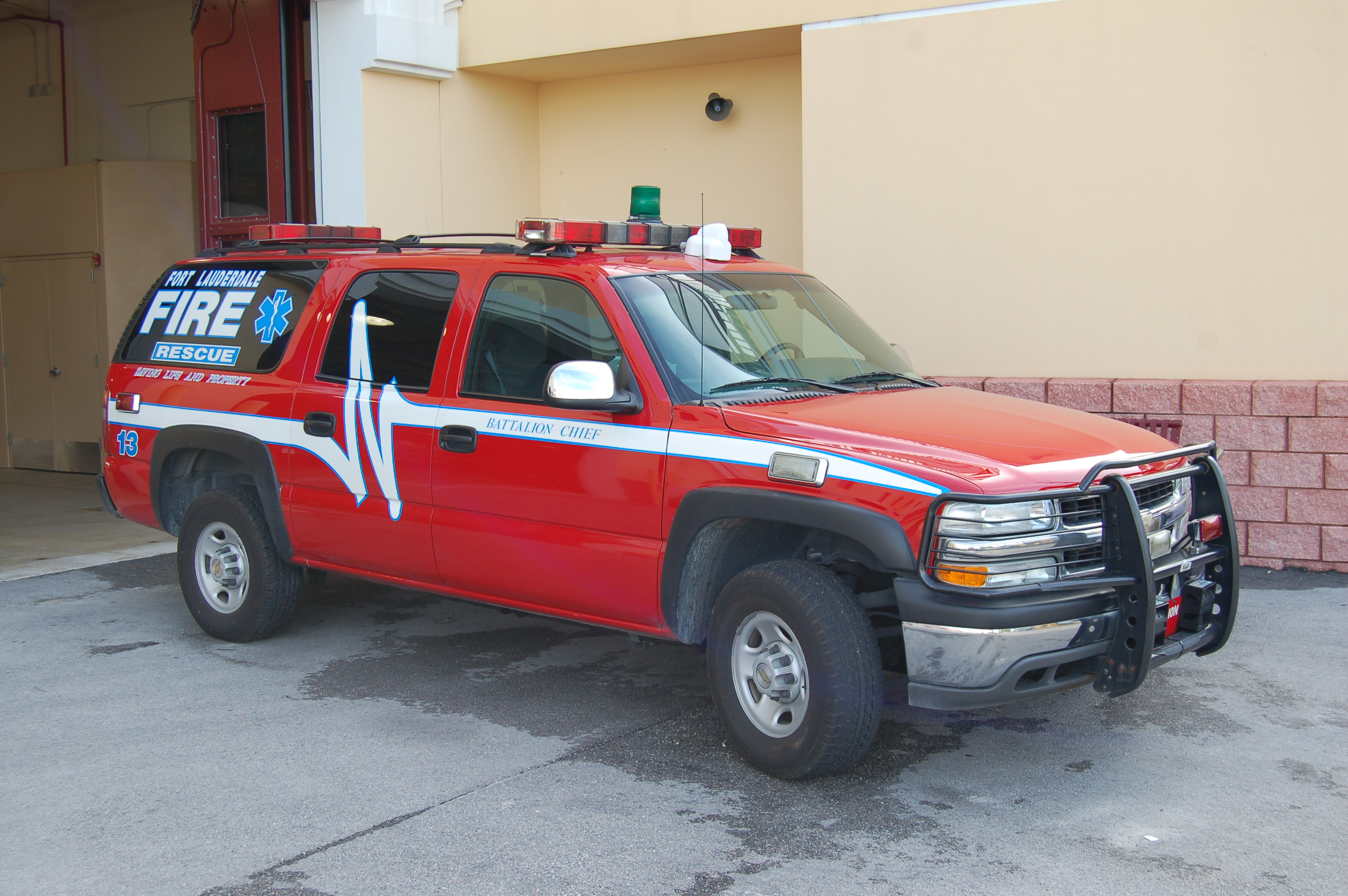
Battalion 13

== See also ==
- Fort Lauderdale Fire and Safety Museum
