= Carrfour Supportive Housing =

Nonprofit organization in Florida, US

Carrfour Supportive Housing (Carrfour)
- Founded: 1993
- Type: Supportive housing organization
- Tax ID no.: 65-0387766
- Location(s): Miami, Florida United States
- Region served: South Florida
- President-CEO: Stephanie Berman-Eisenberg
- Employees: 100+
- Website: carrfour.org

Carrfour Supportive Housing is a nonprofit organization established in 1993 by the Homeless Committee of the Greater Miami Chamber of Commerce. It develops, operates and manages affordable and supportive housing communities for low-income individuals and families in Miami-Dade County, Florida. Carrfour is Florida's largest not-for-profit supportive housing provider, housing more than 10,000 formerly homeless men, women and children in 20 communities throughout Miami-Dade County, assembling over $300 million of financing, tax credits and subsidies, and developing more than 1,700 affordable housing units since its founding.

== History ==
In the early 1990s, as the homeless population of Miami-Dade county grew to more than 8,000 people, the Greater Miami Chamber of Commerce formed a Homeless Committee to find a permanent solution to homelessness. These efforts led the Chamber to establish Carrfour Supportive Housing as a nonprofit entity "whose mission was to provide both permanent housing and supportive services to help the formerly homeless successfully reintegrate into society by helping them achieve their full potential."

In February 2009, Time magazine featured Carrfour in a national science story: The following year, in April 2010, former President Bill Clinton hosted a Clinton Global Initiative day of service at Verde Gardens, which includes a 22-acre organic farm. The community was built on the site of the former Homestead Airforce Base.

A September 2012 national wire story featured the Carrfour community as a new model for tackling homelessness.

In May 2013, Carrfour's Verde Gardens community won the National Development Council's 2013 Academy Award for Housing Development.

Shortly after his confirmation as the 17th United States Secretary of Housing and Urban Development, Dr. Ben Carson visited Carrfour's Villa Aurora community in Miami, seeking to better understand the role federal funding played in providing subsidized housing for very low-income families.

In February 2007, Carrfour opened Harding Village despite construction costs exceeding budget by $1 million.

During the Great Recession, the company's projects were delayed due to issues securing Low-Income Housing Tax Credits.

In 2010, Carrfour was one of several nonprofit organizations that partnered with the city of Miami to renovate 26, one-bedroom apartments in Overtown.

In December 2010, Carrfour started construction of Casa Matias, an 80-unit complex for formerly homeless people.

In 2011, Carrfour was granted $17 million of the $89 million that was directed to Miami-Dade County through the NSP2 program.

In August 2017, Carrfour received a $400,000 grant from the Home Depot Foundation to support homeless disabled veterans.

In April 2018, the company delivered an 88-unit apartment complex for formerly homeless families in Miami Dade.

In March 2025, Carrfour opened a 100-unit apartment complex for people with mental health issues.

== Coalition Lift ==
In June 2016, Carrfour launched Coalition Lift, a $6.5 million Miami-Dade County, Florida project to house 34 chronically homeless men and women. The initiative includes collaboration with the University of South Florida researchers to compare the cost of providing publicly funded housing and supportive services versus the overall taxpayer cost of services for a "control group with similar demographic characteristics who choose not to be housed."

Stephanie Berman-Eisenberg, CEO, estimated "it costs about $6,000 a year to house someone in a supportive facility" versus $30,000-$50,000 annually for emergency services to meet the needs of a chronically homeless person without housing.

== The Residences at Equality Park ==
In August 2016, Carrfour secured financing to develop, build and operate South Florida's first supportive housing community for gay, lesbian, bisexual and transgender seniors. The "Residences at Equality Park" is Carrfour's first development outside of Miami-Dade County. Carrfour's competitive application for tax credits won funding from Florida Housing Finance Corporation for "housing credit and gap financing for affordable housing developments for persons with a disabling condition", providing the financing needed to begin construction of The Residences at Equality Park as an initial 48-unit apartment complex at North Dixie Highway and Northeast 20th Drive in Wilton Manors, Florida.

The effort to create affordable, supportive housing in Wilton Manors began in 2012 when City Commissioner Tom Green proposed development of affordable housing for the community's primarily LGBT seniors. Three years later, the proposal won unanimous support from the City Commission to create "12,346 square feet of retail space and 130 affordable housing units" within The Pride Center at Equality Park's five-acre campus. Pride Center Florida formally partnered with Carrfour to pursue funding, develop and operate the housing complex.
