= LGBTQ culture in Miami =

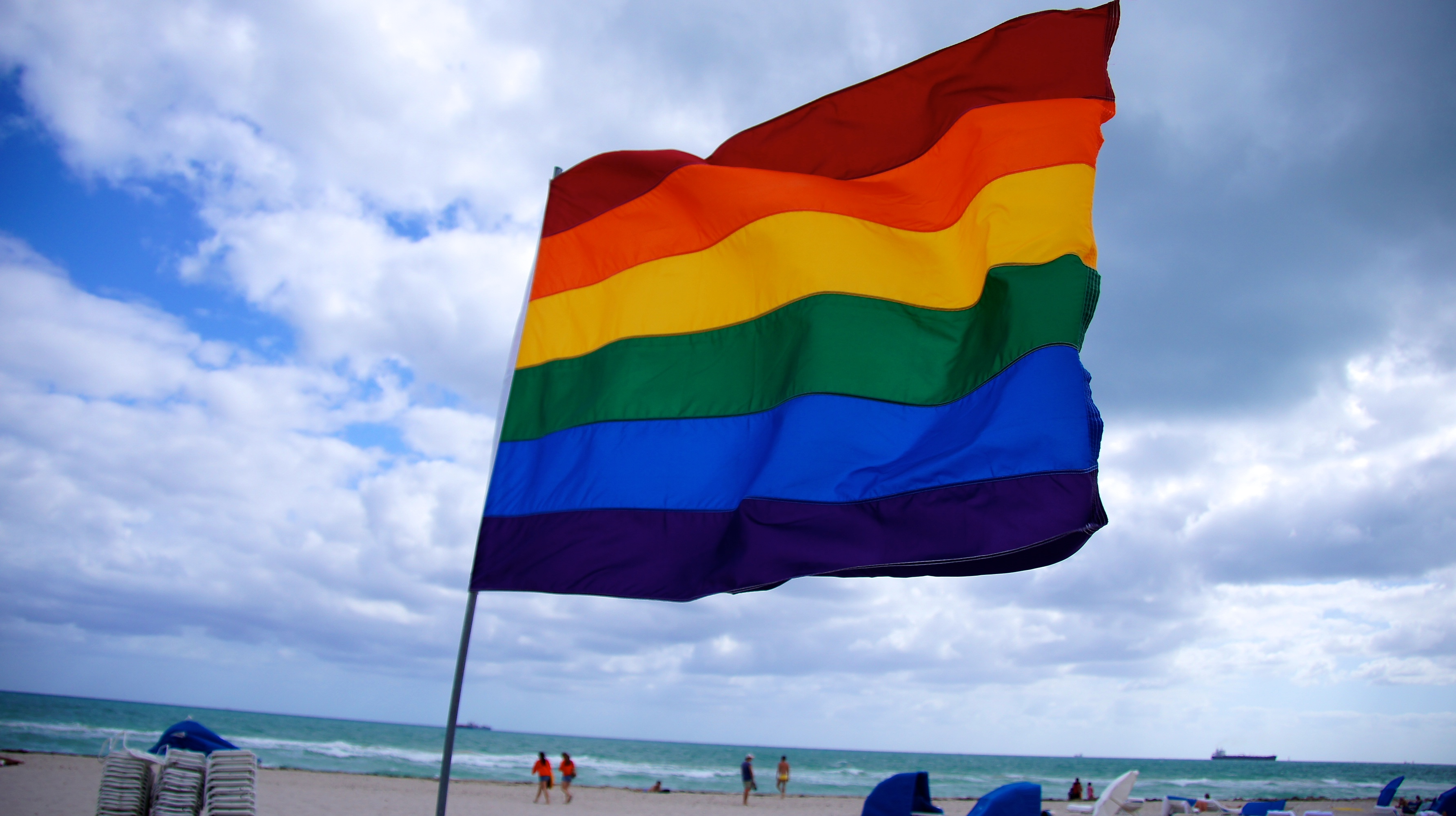
The rainbow flag, symbol of LGBTQ pride, flying in Miami Beach.

Miami has one of the largest and most prominent LGBTQ communities in the United States. Miami has had a gay nightlife scene as early as the 1930s. Miami has a current status as a gay mecca that attracts more than 1 million LGBTQ visitors a year. The Miami area as a whole has been gay-friendly for decades and is one of the few places where the LGBTQ community has its own chamber of commerce, the Miami-Dade Gay and Lesbian Chamber of Commerce (MDGLCC). As of 2005, Miami was home to an estimated 15,277 self-identifying gay and bisexual individuals. The Miami metropolitan area had an estimated 183,346 self-identifying LGBTQ residents.

== History ==
=== Miami Beach Police targeting claims ===
In 2009, the American Civil Liberties Union (ACLU) began looking into instances of Miami Beach Police Department (MBPD) targeting gay men for harassment. In February 2010, the ACLU announced that it will sue the City of Miami Beach for an ongoing targeting and arrests of gay men in public. According to the ACLU, Miami Beach police have a history of arresting gay men for simply looking "too gay".

The incidents between gay men and MBPD resulted in negative publicity for the city. At the meeting with the local gay leaders, Miami Beach Police Chief Carlos Noriega claimed that the incidents were isolated, and promised increased diversity training for police officers.

== Demographics and economy ==
=== Population and concentration ===
As of 2006, the Williams Institute estimates that Miami has 15,777 LGBTQ individuals within city boundaries and 183,346 in the Greater Miami area.

There are an estimated 5,131 married same-sex couples in Miami as of 2015, according to a 2018 study of joint tax filings by the Tax Policy Center. This number represents 0.92% of all marriages.

| Geographic entity | GLB population | Density of GLB individuals per square mile | Percentage of GLB individuals in population |
|---|---|---|---|
| Miami | 15,277 | 424.5 | 5.5 (2005) |
| Miami metropolitan area | 183,346 | 164.3 | 4.5 |

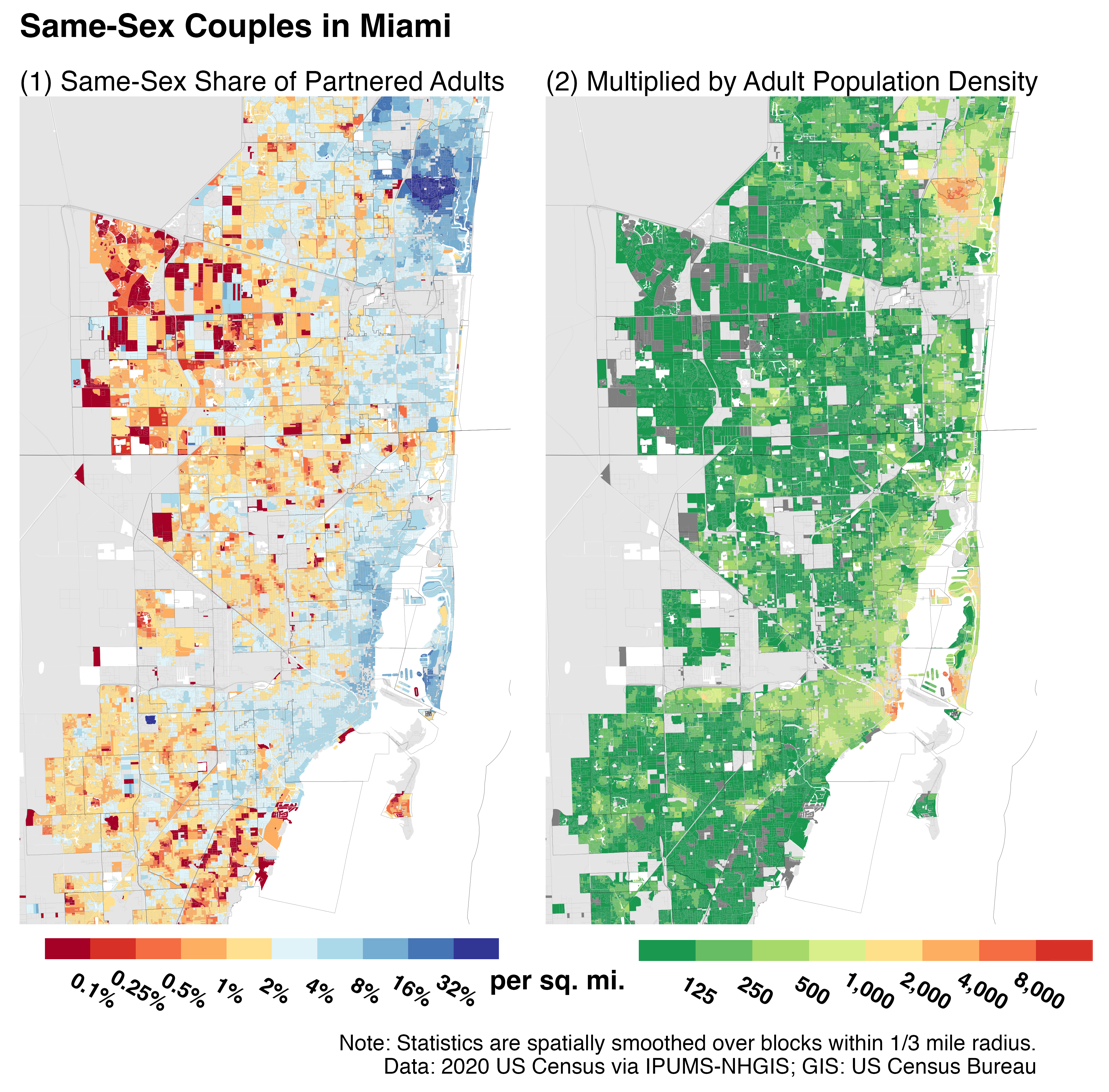
Map of same-sex couples in Miami

== Gay villages ==
=== Miami Beach ===
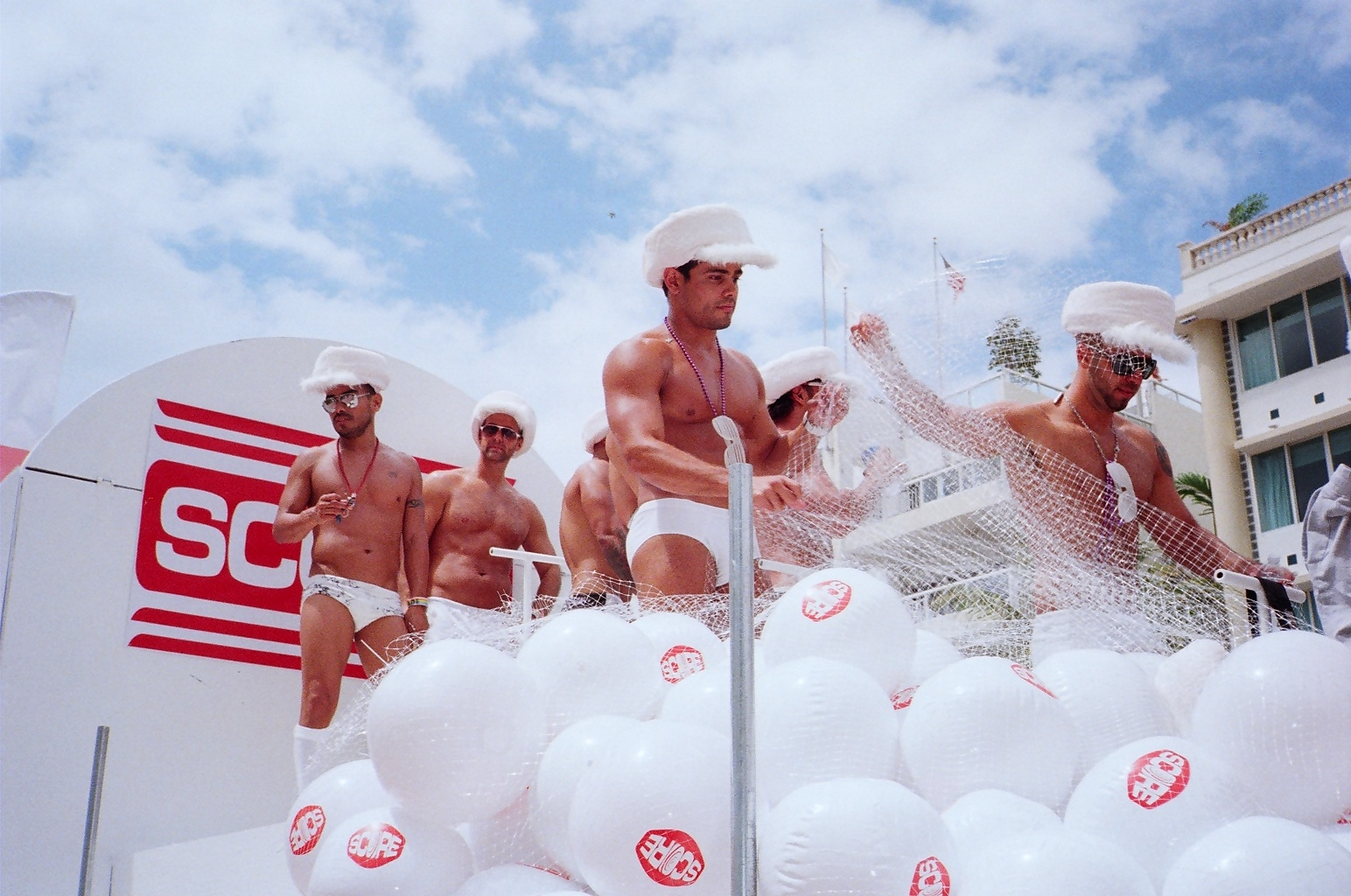
Dancers during Miami Beach Pride 2012

==== Strife in the 2000s ====
As South Beach became more popular as a national and international tourist destination, there have been occasional clashes between cultures and disputes about whether South Beach is as "gay-friendly" as it once was. Some instances of Miami Beach Police brutality against gay men have been at odds with Miami Beach's longstanding image as a welcoming place for gay people.

==== Modern history ====
The passage of progressive civil rights laws, election of outspokenly pro-gay Miami Beach Mayor Matti Bower, and the introduction of Miami Beach's Gay Pride Celebration, have reinvigorated the local LGBTQ community in recent years, which some argued had experienced a decline in the late 2000s.

In January 2010, Miami Beach passed a revised Human Rights Ordinance that strengthens enforcement of already existing human rights laws and adds protections for transgender people, making Miami Beach's human rights laws some of the most progressive in the state. Both residents of, and visitors to, Miami Beach have been able to register as domestic partners since 2004; in 2008 this benefit was extended to all of Miami-Dade County.

In 2010, the Miami-Dade Gay & Lesbian Chamber of Commerce, with support from the City of Miami Beach, opened an LGBTQ Visitor Center at Miami Beach's Old City Hall.

=== Miami ===
Discrimination based on race, color, religion, ancestry, national origin, pregnancy, age, disability, marital status, familial status, veteran status, source of income, sexual orientation and gender identity or expression is illegal in Miami, as is attempted conversion therapy.

=== Wilton Manors ===
Wilton Manors is known as The Island City, because it is entirely surrounded by water, and is its own municipality within Broward County, Florida. It is home to a sizable LGBTQ population as well as winter vacationers, who frequent its many nightclubs and gay-owned businesses along the main street, Wilton Drive; the 2010 U.S. Census reported that it is second only to Provincetown, Massachusetts in the proportion (15%) of gay couples relative to the total population (couples as reported to the U.S. Census). It contains a large Pride center, the World AIDS Museum and Educational Center, and a branch of the Stonewall National Museum & Archives. The mayor, Gary Resnick, refers on his official biography to his male partner.

The city web page highlights LGBTQ life in Wilton Manors, stating that "the City of Wilton Manors Police Department conducts police training that is geared toward working with the City’s LGBTQ population and has gay and lesbian officers amongst its ranks." All members of the city commission are LGBTQ, with the exception of Vice Mayor Scott Newton.

== Organizations and community institutions ==
The Stonewall National Museum and Archives (SNMA) is a nonprofit, tax-exempt organization that promotes understanding through preserving and sharing the culture of lesbian, gay, bisexual and transgender people and their role in society. The Stonewall Museum Gallery is located at 2157 Wilton Drive in Wilton Manors. The Stonewall Library & Archives is located at 1300 East Sunrise Blvd. in Fort Lauderdale.

== Culture and recreation ==
=== Miami Beach Pride ===
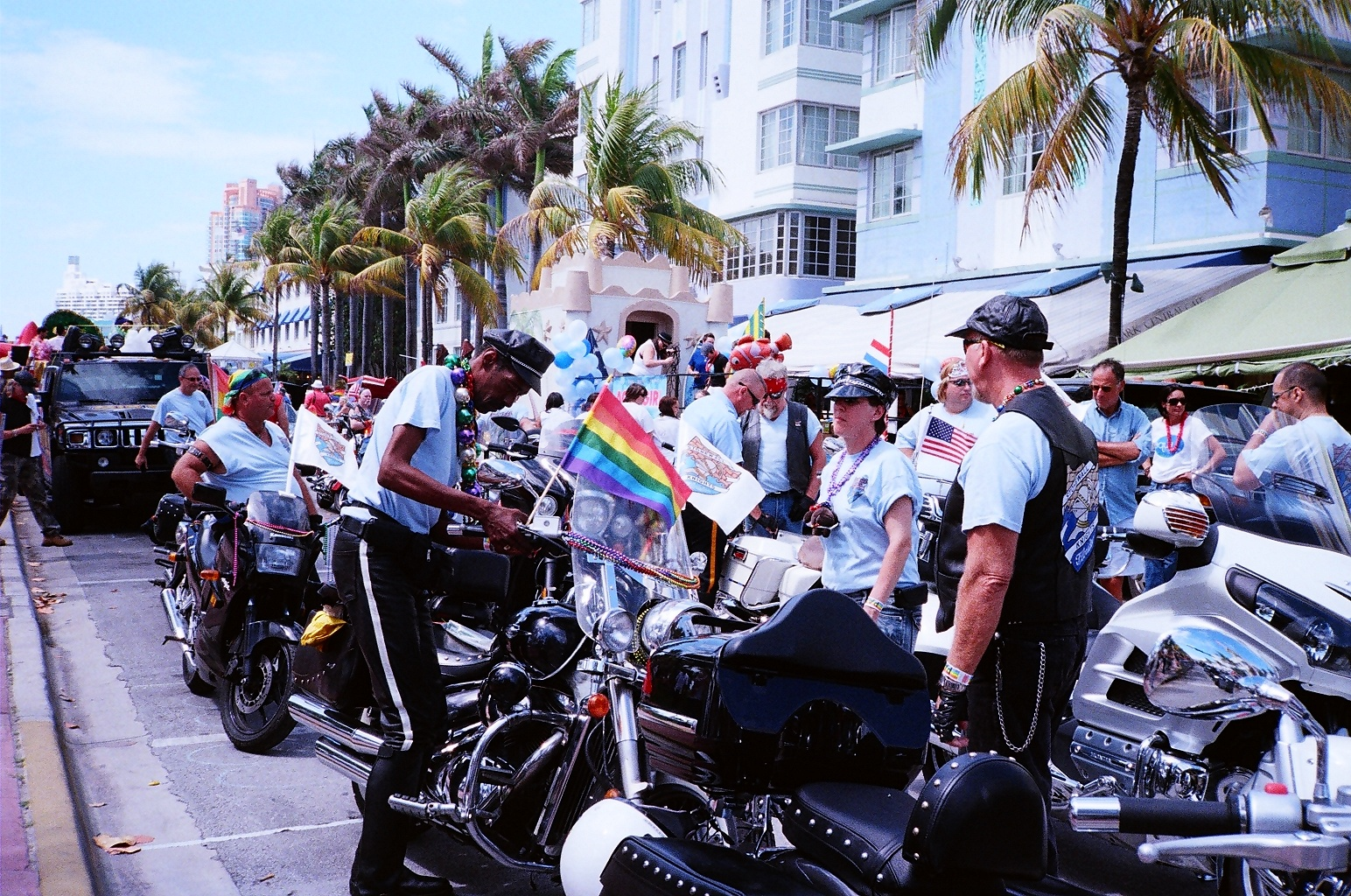
Bikers on Ocean Drive during Miami Beach Pride

The annual Miami Beach Pride is a week long, city-sanctioned event in Miami, first held in 2009.

It has also attracted many celebrities such as Chaz Bono, Adam Lambert, Gloria Estefan, Mario Lopez, and Elvis Duran who were Grand Marshals for Pride weekend from 2012 through 2016 respectively.

The 2010 Pride drew tens of thousands of people. In 2013 there were more than 80,000 people who participated in the event. Miami Beach Pride celebrated its 10th annual Gay Pride Festival in 2018, with 130,000 people attending.

=== OutShine Film Festival ===
The OutShine Film Festival is an LGBTQ international film festival taking place each April in Miami and each October in Ft. Lauderdale featuring high caliber first-run international films and cultural driven events. The OutShine Film Festival has grown to include eight days of films and features an "Angel's Award" that honors individuals who dedicate their time and energy promoting LGBTQ film arts.

=== Gay8 "Ocho" Festival ===
A pivotal event in redefining the Little Havana urban enclave is the annual Gay8 Festival, the largest Hispanic LGBTQ festival in the United States. Starting with its inception in 2015, the Gay8 Festival attracts more than 60,000 attendees annually. The festival celebrates diversity and inclusion combining art, a curated food section, curated booth vendors, several themed dance parties, a doggie village, free films at the historic Tower Theatre and cultural arts into one gigantic party in the heart of Miami's historic Little Havana neighborhood. The festival is instrumental in balancing historic preservation with economic development, promoting tourism and investment, and celebrating diversity and inclusion by connecting LGBTQ and other diverse communities throughout South Florida. The Gay8 Festival's 4Ward Gala "Pa'lante Awards" is designed to bring awareness to social justice issues and celebrates individuals spearheading social causes. The Gay8 Festival features an LGBTQ Human Rights Symposium aimed at bringing thought leaders from South Florida, other parts of the United States, Canada, the Caribbean and Latin America together for education and human rights advocacy for the Pan-American region.

== See also ==
- LGBTQ history in Florida
- LGBTQ rights in Florida
- LGBTQ Americans
- LGBTQ rights in the United States
- South Florida Gay News
- Miami demographics
- I Am Jazz
- Flava Works
- Same-sex marriage in Florida
- SAVE
- A Celebration of Friends
- Southern Comfort Conference
