= Fort Lauderdale High School =

Public high school in Fort Lauderdale, Florida, United States

Location
- 1600 NE 4th Ave; Fort Lauderdale, Florida 33305; United States; 26.1484186°N 80.1394895°W

Information
- Type: Public School
- Motto: "Strong and True, White and Blue"
- Established: 1899
- School district: Broward County Public Schools
- Superintendent: Dr. Howard Hepburn
- Principal: Erin Brown
- Teaching staff: 96.00 (FTE)
- Grades: 9-12
- Enrollment: 2,228 (2022–23)
- Student to teacher ratio: 23.21
- Colors: White; Blue
- Mascot: Flying L
- Website: https://fortlauderdale.browardschools.com/

Fort Lauderdale High School is a high school located in Fort Lauderdale, Florida that serves students in grades 9 through 12. The school is a part of the Broward County Public Schools district. Founded in 1899 as a school for whites, the high school is the oldest continuously functioning high school in Broward County, Florida, and the oldest in South Florida.

Fort Lauderdale High has an FCAT School grade of "A" for the 2011-2012 school year, the highest grade a school can achieve.

It serves: portions of Fort Lauderdale, Wilton Manors, Lazy Lake, a portion of Oakland Park, and a portion of Lauderdale-by-the-Sea.

== History ==
On October 2, 1899, Fort Lauderdale’s first school would open in what was then Dade County. Ivy Cromartie (later to become Ivy Stranahan) welcomed nine students into a wood-framed schoolhouse located on South Andrews Avenue, south of the New River. By 1901, there were 18 students enrolled at Fort Lauderdale with only 997 enrolled in all of Dade County. In 1902 the School Board began offering transportation to students living in Hallandale who needed to attend school; each day, students would climb aboard wagons for the ride.

By 1910, Fort Lauderdale’s population had grown enough to require the building of a new school so, the old two-room schoolhouse was moved slightly northward to make room. The “modern” two-story concrete school was constructed for a total cost of $7,000. At the time, Fort Lauderdale was the only high school in the 68-mile stretch between Miami and West Palm Beach. By 1914, enrollment reached 325 with only 47 being high school students; this was the first year with a full nine-month term.

In 1915, a 46 to 16 vote led the way for construction of a new Fort Lauderdale High School in the newly designated Broward County. The new school was located three blocks east of Andrews Avenue adjacent to Stranahan Park and was constructed for $55,000. The school was also referred to as Central High School because of the large area it served. The first graduating class in 1915 consisted of five boys. By 1916, it could boast that all nine of its teachers had college degrees. In 1924, Fort Lauderdale established its first Honor Society. 1962 saw the opening of the new Fort Lauderdale High School at its present location on NE Fourth Avenue, with its first graduating class celebrating commencement in June, 1963.

The past few years have seen tremendous changes to the FLHS campus, most notably the opening of a new three-story classroom building, a modern library, and a two-story cafeteria.

2007 also saw the renaming of NE 4 Ave between the city divider and NE 13 St as “Flying L Drive” in honor of the school's commitment to education and community service. The project was completed by a group of four students in John Pellegrino's Public Affairs class.

== Magnet Programs ==
=== Pre-Law & Public Affairs ===
A college preparatory program designed for those interested in careers in Law, Criminal Justice, and Public Affairs.

Because of its location in the county seat, the program allows students access to governmental agencies that are utilized as “living laboratories” for the ultimate learning experience. Students participate in mock trials in a courtroom housed within the school as well as take field trips to the Broward County Courthouse to witness actual trials.

Due to strong student interest in pre-law studies, the FLHS debate team competes at the state and national levels and provides students with opportunities to participate in debate competitions.

=== Advanced Studies Institute ===
Allows for students to take more Advanced Placement courses, putting them ahead when they enter college. They offer a wide variety of AP courses from Art to History to English.

=== Cambridge Program ===
An international pre-university program developed by Cambridge University, designed with a varied curriculum, which also allows students to earn college credit.

== Awards ==
Fort Lauderdale High School was named as one of the top 1000 public schools in the nation in 2005, 2006, and 2007. Dr. Gina Eyerman was also named Assistant Principal of the Year at South Plantation High in 2003 just before coming to FLHS.

== Mascot ==
Fort Lauderdale High School is well known in Broward County for its unique mascot, the "Flying L": a large winged blue "L" with an arrow through its center. Originally the school mascot was known as "The Fort Lauderdale L". However, at the 1917 state track meet, a reporter from the Miami Herald remarked "Look at that L Fly" as track star Charlie Rhodes ran to victory, starring in numerous events. The following week, the town of Fort Lauderdale voted on nicknaming all of the school's sports teams "The Flying L's".

== Athletics ==
Fort Lauderdale Track Team circa 1921

The Athletic Program began in 1915 with only two men's sports, Fort Lauderdale High now provides the students with eleven varsity sports for men and ten varsity sports for women. The school also offers four junior varsity sports for men and five junior varsity sports for women to participate in. In 1917, FLHS won their first state championship in track, which is where the unique mascot was derived. Over the years the program has accumulated fifty-nine state championships. In 2001 the girls' basketball team won the 4A State Basketball Championship and later in 2004 the boys' track team won the 3A State Championship and Class 3A Region 4 Championship.

In 1967, Fort Lauderdale High School met Dillard High School in the season opener for both teams. This, along with another game in Broward County between Ely and McArthur the same night, was the first meeting between white and black teams. Prior to the game, the FLHS team members held their own practices as the coaches refused to hold practice due to an ongoing teacher strike.

The current Athletic Director is Timothy 'TJ' Lawrence.

== Demographics ==
As of the 2021-22 school year, the total student enrollment was 2,336. The ethnic makeup of the school was 46.4% Black, 47% White, 22.3% Hispanic, 1.9% Asian, 0.1% Pacific Islander, 3.7% Multiracial, and 0.9% Native American or Native Alaskan.

== Notable alumni ==
- Rita Mae Brown, author
- Susan Cameron, CEO of Reynolds American
- Rod Carter, former football player
- Bob Clark, film director (Porky's and A Christmas Story)
- Catherine Hickland, soap opera actress
- Frantz Joseph, Canadian Football League (CFL) player of the Edmonton Eskimos
- Jeffrey Julmis, 2012 Olympian (100m Hurdles)
- Ross Kananga, stuntman and crocodile farmer
- Elijah Manley, activist, politician, and youngest presidential candidate in US history
- Mark Muir Mills, nuclear scientist
- C.M. Newton, retired college basketball coach and Naismith Memorial Basketball Hall of Fame member
- Alexander "Sandy" Nininger, the first Medal of Honor recipient of World War II
- Alex Sadkin, record producer
- Scot Shields, professional baseball player
- Craig Skok, Major League Baseball pitcher
- Nancy Stafford, actress and author
- Fabrice Ziolkowski, screenwriter
