= World AIDS Museum and Educational Center =

Museum in Fort Lauderdale, Florida, US

Coordinates: 40.7447°N 74.1801°W

Logo

The World AIDS Museum and Educational Center, located at 1350 E Sunrise Blvd. in Fort Lauderdale, Florida, opened on May 15, 2014.

== History ==
The AIDS Museum and Educational Center began as an HIV support group, Pozitive Attitudes, at the Pride Center in Fort Lauderdale. The facilitator of that group was Steve Stagon and it was his idea to create an AIDS museum, in south Florida because Broward County and Miami-Dade County are "the epicenter of the AIDS crisis in America" and because of the area's LGBTQ population. After a series of temporary exhibits in churches and the Pride Center, they choose the location on 26th Street.

=== The building ===
On November 7, 2013, Magic Johnson visited the World AIDS Museum and dedicated the space, 22 years to the day he announced his HIV status. Doors officially opened to the public in May 2014.

The World AIDS Museum and Educational Center has a main gallery featuring the historical timeline of the AIDS epidemic, exhibits on Stigma, and a travelling photography exhibit, The Face of HIV, which is now hung in The Urban League of Broward County's community gallery. They also do educational programs in schools and community organizations. The current Executive Director is Dr. Requel Lopes, AP. WAM is now located at the 1350 E. Sunrise Blvd., Fort Lauderdale, FL 33304 in the ArtServe Facility.

Author and AIDS activist Larry Kramer, spoke at the museum on March 9, 2017 in conjunction with an exhibit that honored his work.

== Traveling AIDS Museum project based in Newark, New Jersey ==
The AIDS Museum is a nonprofit organization based in Newark, New Jersey, with a collection of art related to AIDS and art by artists living with HIV . It was founded in December 2004.

Among the museum's (traveling) exhibits have been:

- an exhibit of art by HIV-positive artists titled "Eyes of Mercy", was held from November 11 through December 1, 2006 at Seton Hall University in South Orange, NJ.
- The museum also co-organized an exhibit titled "Edge of Light: Art in the Age of AIDS" at the Paul Robeson Center Gallery at Rutgers Newark, which ran from July 2007 until December 2007.
- the World Culture Open Gallery (New York) was the site of a collaborative project called "Positive Still: Artists Respond to AIDS" featuring, among other artwork, five pieces from the AIDS Museum's permanent collection.

There is an AIDS Museum in Thailand and another being developed in South Africa.
