= The Pride Center at Equality Park =

LGBTQ+ community center in Florida

- Formation: 1993; 33 years ago
- Founder: Alan Schubert
- Type: Charitable organization (IRS exemption status): 501(c)(3)
- Headquarters: Wilton Manors, Florida, United States
- Region served: South Florida
- Method: Donations and Grants
- Revenue: $2.2 million
- Website: pridecenterflorida.org

The Pride Center at Equality Park is an LGBTQ+ community center in Wilton Manors, Florida, that serves Broward County, Palm Beach County, and Fort Lauderdale. The center provides information, news, and events that affect South Florida's LGBTQ community. Established in 1993, the center is headquartered within a 30,000 square feet (2,800 m^{2}) building with meeting and office space for individuals, programs, services, and organizations. The goal of the center is to empower the LGBT communities in South Florida.

The center hosts more than 60 regularly-meeting groups each month. Support, social, and educational groups focus on women, seniors, youth, men, the trans community, recovery, health, the arts, athletics, spirituality, games, and more. It is also a major site for HIV testing and prevention, education and counseling, and also offers holistic and comprehensive support programs for persons living with HIV/AIDS. AIDS memorabilia that later would be displayed in the World AIDS Museum and Educational Center were first exhibited here.

In 2015, Pride Center Florida generated more than $2 million in annual revenues; its main revenue comes from grants and government contracts of $1.2 million and $527,000 in annual members' dues and contributions. Net assets exceeded $6.2 million, including property and equipment valued at more than $5.3 million. Programs are supported by a diverse group of local and national sponsors, such as Wells Fargo, JetBlue, Whole Foods, Seminole Hard Rock Hotel and Casino, Ketel One, Greater Fort Lauderdale Convention and Visitors Bureau, and AHF AIDS Healthcare Foundation.

SAGE, the country's largest and oldest organization dedicated to improving the lives of LGBT older adults, is one of the center's most popular programs, including 398 active members with 175 LGBT seniors attending weekly get-togethers. In August 2016, SAGE estimated there are 43,000 LGBT older adults in Miami-Dade, Broward and Palm Beach counties.

The agency organizes an annual Tropical Plant Fair each spring, including several dozen vendor booths.

== Alan Schubert ==
The Pride Center grew out of the initial vision of founder Alan Schubert, one of the earliest public leaders of Fort Lauderdale's gay and lesbian community. Schubert died of cancer on June 1, 2016. He was 70 years old. Schubert's legacy includes the Pride Center where the main building bears his name and a long history of financial support and bringing community resources together on behalf of causes that included the Broward Gay and Lesbian Youth Group, the Child Care Connection, the Jewish AIDS Network, Broward Public Library, Human Rights Campaign, Center One and Tuesday's Angels.

Upon his death, The Pride Center said:

His impact on this community and beyond is immeasurable. In 1993, Schubert--philanthropist and gay pioneer--conceived the idea for the then Gay and Lesbian Community Center of South Florida. Alan determined that a safe community center in Fort Lauderdale could assist existing and new groups serving the LGBTQ communities. Twenty three years later this month, The Center continues to honor Alan's original vision. Alan and his husband Robert recently moved back to South Florida. Our Center family has enjoyed the opportunity to hear directly from Alan his joy at the growth and evolution of The Center. Our thoughts and prayers are with his partner Robert, their family and friends.

— The Pride Center,

== Housing for LGBT Seniors ==
In August 2016, a partnership between the Pride Center and Carrfour Supportive Housing secured financing to develop, build and operate South Florida's first supportive housing community that will significantly serve gay, lesbian, bisexual and transgender seniors. Carrfour's competitive application for tax credits won funding from Florida Housing Finance Corporation for housing credit and gap financing for affordable housing developments for persons with a disabling condition, providing the financing needed to begin construction of The Residences at Equality Park as an initial 48-unit apartment complex on the Pride Center's campus at North Dixie Highway and Northeast 20th Drive in Wilton Manors, Florida.

The effort to create affordable, supportive housing in Wilton Manors began in 2012 when City Commissioner Tom Green proposed development of affordable housing for the community's primarily LGBTQ seniors. Three years later, the proposal won unanimous support from the City Commission to create 12,346 square feet of retail space and 130 affordable housing units within The Pride Center's five-acre campus. Pride Center formally partnered with Carrfour to pursue funding, develop and operate the housing complex.

== Public Outreach ==
Since 2010, Pride Center Florida has published a quarterly newsletter, known as the Pride Center Voice. The newsletter is distributed in print and electronically. The organization also maintains an active social media presence, including on Facebook, Twitter, and YouTube. The Dolphin Democrats, the oldest LGBT political organization in Florida, hosts their monthly meeting at the Pride Center.
