= Lazy Lake, Florida =

- Village
- Village of Lazy Lake
- Location of Lazy Lake in Broward County, Florida
- Coordinates: 26°9′22″N 80°8′42″W
- Country: United States
- State: Florida
- County: Broward
- Founded: 1946
- Incorporated: June 3, 1953

Government
  - Type: Mayor-Council
  - Mayor: Ray Nyhuis
  - Council Members: Jeff Grenell, Warren Nadeau, William Daugherty, Dana Merrill, and Arnold "Arnie" Aliff
  - Village Administrator: Tedra Allen
  - Village Attorney: Pamala Ryan

Area
  - Total: 0.023 sq mi (0.06 km^{2})
  - Land: 0.023 sq mi (0.06 km^{2})
  - Water: 0 sq mi (0.00 km^{2})
- Elevation: 3.3 ft (1 m)

Population (2020)
  - Total: 33
  - Density: 1,430/sq mi (554/km^{2})
- Time zone: UTC-5 (Eastern (EST))
  - Summer (DST): UTC-4 (EDT)
- ZIP code: 33305
- Area codes: 954, 754
- FIPS code: 12-39750
- GNIS feature ID: 2407489
- Website: lazylakefl.us

Lazy Lake is a village in Broward County, Florida, United States. The village is part of the Miami metropolitan area of South Florida. It has no police department or fire department. The population was 33 at the 2020 census. The village is an enclave surrounded by the city of Wilton Manors.

== History ==
In 1946, real estate developer and contractor Hal Ratliff began the process of building the community around an old rock quarry (which later was filled with water and became the village's artificial lake.) He had the help of architect Clinton Gamble, who designed the original homes, and financier and accountant Charles H. Lindfors, who initially bought the land. Ratliff's goal was to build a community that was low-key, with heavy forestry infrastructure, allowing neighbors to keep to themselves and have some anonymity. Lazy Lake received its name when a friend of Hal Ratliff remarked that the lake looked "so lazy and peaceful."

When nearby Wilton Manors decided to incorporate as a city, it asked Lazy Lake's residents whether they wanted to be annexed to Wilton Manors. Lazy Lake's residents decided to incorporate themselves on June 3, 1953, as the Village of Lazy Lake instead.

It is the smallest incorporated municipality in Broward County by area. This low population was because the town originally had been composed of single family homes in a small housing development, with a lake named Lazy Lake (its namesake) in the middle of the houses surrounding it. The village started with 13 homes on 13 acres (the maximum allowed by the charter.) The three homes of the three main founders of the village were the first to be built on the property, which was originally platted for a subdivision.

As of 1985, the village's annual budget was $7,000.

In 1995, residents agreed to place the entire village up for sale at $15 million, but nobody purchased it. It was on the market for two years, and Sue Carolyn Wise, their broker, went on television news stations and shows like CNN and A Current Affair to help promote the sale. People such as O. J. Simpson and a Kuwaiti prince were interested, but ultimately did not buy the village. After the two years of trying to be sold, Lazy Lake came off the market, and the village decided not to have the broker's contract renewed.

During 2008, a few residents on the village's north side wanted to disincorporate, secede and get annexed and incorporated into the city of Wilton Manors. The reason this small movement failed was because most residents on the south part of the village wanted to remain a village, which was due largely in part because the mayor and most council members at that time lived on the south side.

== Geography ==
According to the United States Census Bureau, the village has a total area of 0.023 square miles (0.06 km^{2}), all land.

The village is a landlocked enclave surrounded entirely within the borders of the city of Wilton Manors.

Lazy Lane is the only road in the village.

Lazy Lake is surrounded by NE 24 Street to the north, NE 21 Court to the south, NE 1 Avenue to the east, and North Andrews Avenue to the west.

=== Climate ===
The Village of Lazy Lake has a tropical climate, similar to the climate found in much of the Caribbean. It is part of the only region in the 48 contiguous states that falls under that category. More specifically, it generally has a tropical rainforest climate (Köppen climate classification: Af), bordering a tropical monsoon climate (Köppen climate classification: Am).

== Demographics ==
Historical population
Census	Pop.	Note	%±
1960	49		—
1970	48		−2.0%
1980	31		−35.4%
1990	33		6.5%
2000	38		15.2%
2010	24		−36.8%
2020	33		37.5%
U.S. Decennial Census

=== 2010 and 2020 census ===
Lazy Lake racial composition (Hispanics excluded from racial categories) (NH = Non-Hispanic)
Race	Pop 2010	Pop 2020	% 2010	% 2020
White (NH)	20	23	83.33%	69.70%
Black or African American (NH)	1	0	4.17%	0.00%
Native American or Alaska Native (NH)	1	2	4.17%	6.06%
Asian (NH)	0	0	0.00%	0.00%
Pacific Islander or Native Hawaiian (NH)	0	0	0.00%	0.00%
Some other race (NH)	0	0	0.00%	0.00%
Two or more races/Multiracial (NH)	0	1	0.00%	3.03%
Hispanic or Latino (any race)	2	7	8.33%	21.21%
Total	24	33	100.00%	100.00%

As of the 2020 United States census, there were 33 people, 8 households, and 1 family residing in the village.

As of the 2010 United States census, there were 24 people, 8 households, and 0 families residing in the village.

=== 2000 census ===
In 2000, 41.7% had children under the age of 18 living with them, 41.7% were married couples living together, and 41.7% were non-families. 8.3% of all households were made up of individuals, and none had someone living alone who was 65 years of age or older. The average household size was 3.17 and the average family size was 3.14.

In 2000, the village population was spread out, with 18.4% under the age of 18, 18.4% from 18 to 24, 26.3% from 25 to 44, 31.6% from 45 to 64, and 5.3% who were 65 years of age or older. The median age was 36 years. For every 100 females, there were 245.5 males. For every 100 females age 18 and over, there were 342.9 males.

In 2000, the median income for a household in the village was $142,581, and the median income for a family was $41,667. Males had a median income of $31,875 versus $31,250 for females. The per capita income for the village was $33,423. There were no families and 15.4% of the population living below the poverty line, including nobody under 18, and none of those over 64 years old.

As of 2000, speakers of English as a first language made up 100% of the population. It was the only municipality in all of Broward County that had no other languages spoken as their mother tongue.

== Education ==
Broward County Public Schools operates public schools. Zoned schools are Wilton Manors Elementary, Sunrise Middle School, and Fort Lauderdale High School.

In addition the community is in the service area of the magnet school Pompano Beach High School.
