= A Celebration of Friends =

- Locations: Florida, USA
- Inaugurated: 2001 (Miami, United States)
- Organiser: Tom (Tomcat) Pence
- Website: http://www.celebrationoffriends.org

A Celebration of Friends (ACOF) is an annual social gathering for gay mature men in Florida. It was founded in 2001, and every summer it brings together hundreds of people from all over the world for a weekend event in Orlando. The organization also raises money for local charity. In the past, its funds have been distributed to organizations such as Tuesday's Angels, the Pride Center at Equality Park, and Buzzy's Boys.

For the past three years, the annual event has been held in Fort Lauderdale, Florida In addition to the annual summer event, there is now a winter event, known as the January Jamboree, also held in Fort Lauderdale.
