= Fort Lauderdale Fire and Safety Museum =

Museum in Florida, United States

The Fort Lauderdale Fire and Safety Museum, located at 1022 West Las Olas Blvd., Fort Lauderdale, Florida, is housed in the Historic Fort Lauderdale Fire Station, built in 1927. It was no longer needed by the Fire Department after 2004, and was renovated as a museum. On display are photos, videos, historic uniforms, and equipment. It presents information on major fires and emergencies that challenged Fort Lauderdale firefighters through the years. In 2024 and 2025, the Museum served as the location of Fort Lauderdale's 9/11 remembrance ceremonies.
