= Fort Lauderdale Executive Airport =

Airport in Florida, United States

Coordinates: 26°11′50″N 080°10′15″W

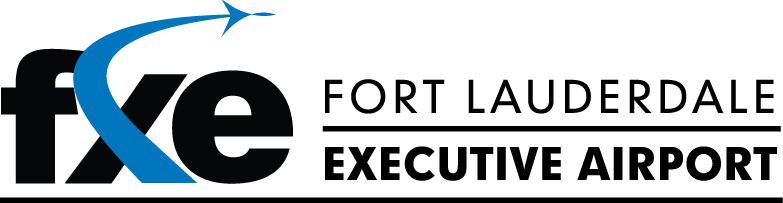

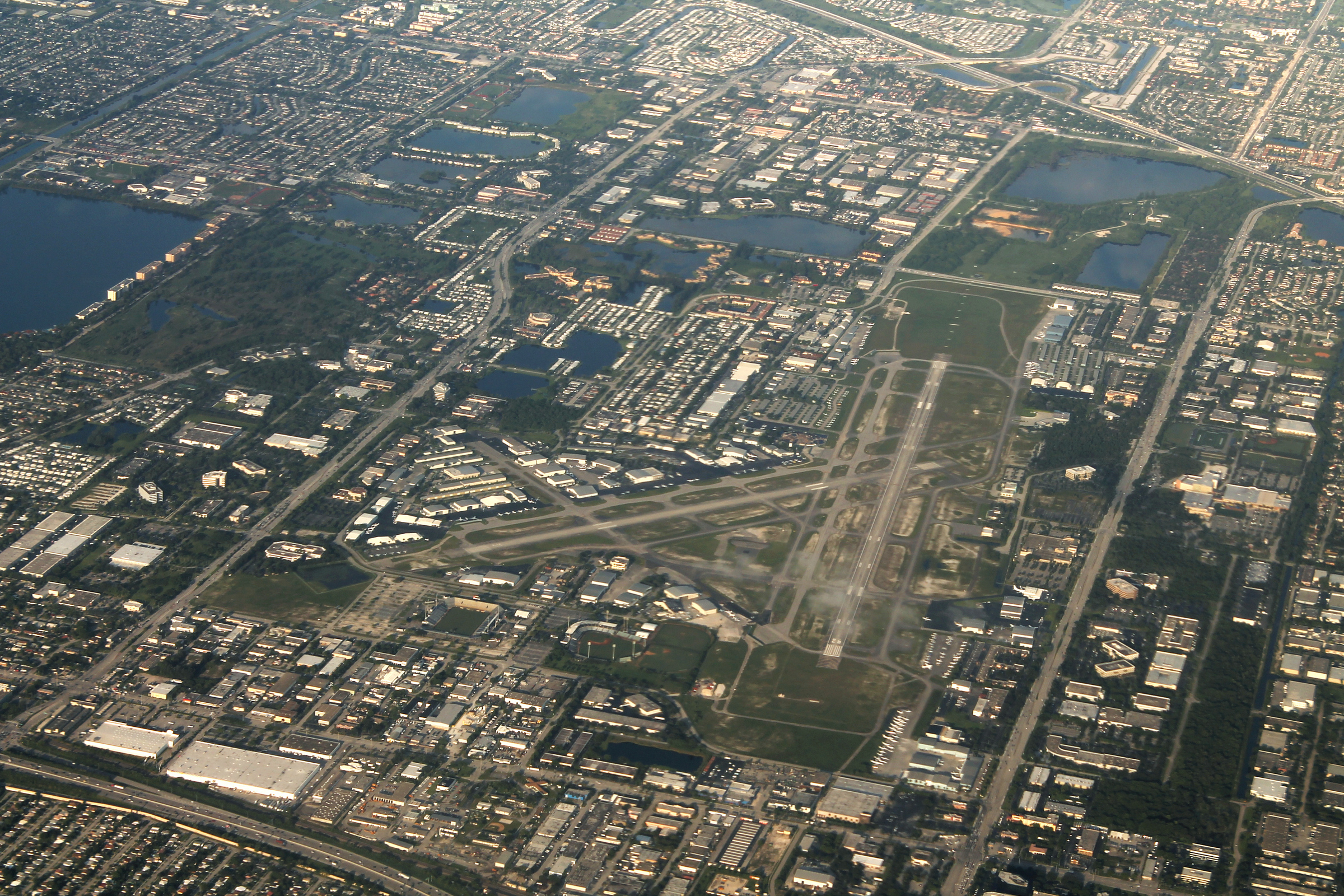
- IATA: FXE; ICAO: KFXE; FAA LID: FXE

Summary
- Airport type: Public
- Owner: City of Fort Lauderdale
- Location: Fort Lauderdale, Florida, U.S.
- Elevation AMSL: 13 ft (4.0 m)
- Website: www.flyfxe.com

Maps
- FAA airport diagram
- Interactive map of Fort Lauderdale Executive Airport

Runways
Direction	Length		Surface
Direction	ft	m	Surface
9/27	6,002	1,829	Asphalt
13/31	4,000	1,219	Asphalt

Statistics (2015)
- Aircraft operations: 159,999
- Based aircraft: 995
- Source: Federal Aviation Administration

Fort Lauderdale Executive Airport (IATA: FXE, ICAO: KFXE, FAA LID: FXE) is a general aviation airport located within the city limits of Fort Lauderdale, in Broward County, Florida, United States, five miles (8.0 km) north of downtown Fort Lauderdale. It is a division of the Transportation and Mobility Department of the City of Fort Lauderdale.

== Overview ==
The airport was built in 1941 to train Naval Aviators during World War II, and was named West Prospect Satellite Field. In 1947, the federal government deeded the airport to Fort Lauderdale for use as a public airport.

The airport serves over 150,000 aircraft operations per year, making it the eighth-busiest General Aviation center in the United States. The airport is designated as general aviation reliever facility for the Fort Lauderdale-Hollywood International Airport by the FAA. The airport is a Landing Rights Airport with a U.S. Customs and Border Protection facility. The airport also operates a 24/7 ARFF facility that meets the requirements of index B, although the airport is not certificated under FAR Part 139. ARFF services are provided by Fort Lauderdale Fire-Rescue.

The airport is home to two rare Florida native species of animal, the gopher tortoise and the Florida burrowing owl.

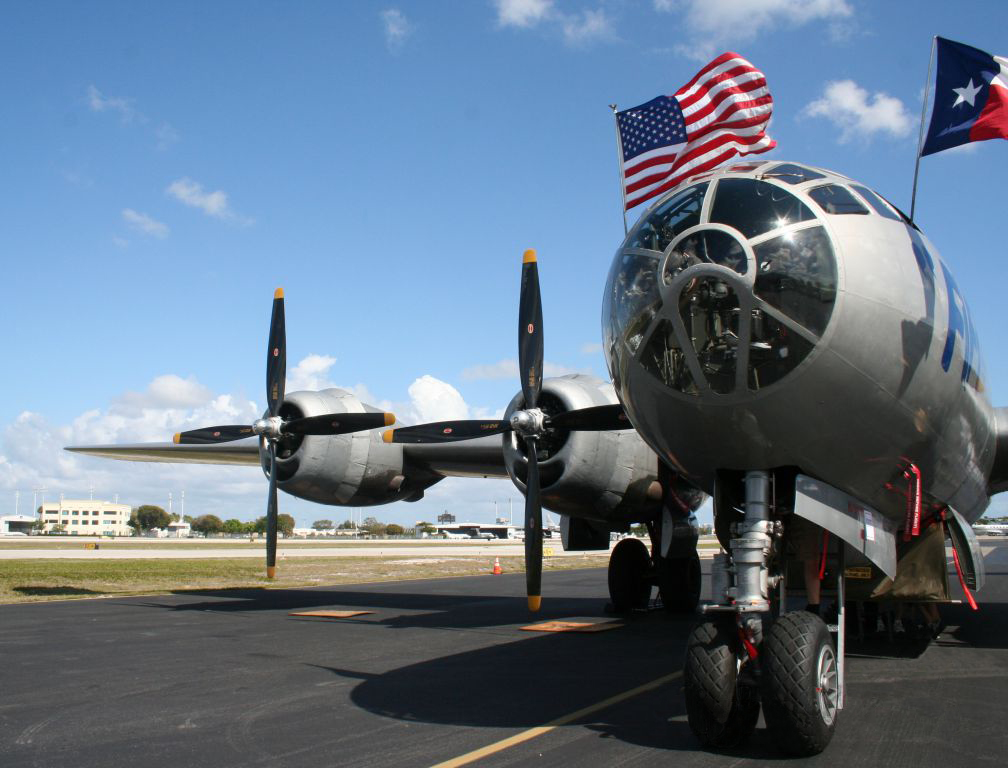
"FIFI", one of (as of January 2024) two airworthy B-29 Superfortresses, visiting KFXE in 2012

== Facilities and aircraft ==
Fort Lauderdale Executive Airport covers an area of 1,050 acres (420 ha) which contains two asphalt paved runways: 09/27 measuring 6,002 ft × 100 ft (1,829 m × 30 m) and 13/31 measuring 4,000 ft × 100 ft (1,219 m × 30 m).

The airport is ideal for flight training because of its 24-hour air traffic control tower and has multiple instrument approaches. For the 12-month period ending December 31, 2017, the airport had 179,023 aircraft operations, an average of 490 per day: 94% general aviation, 6% air taxi and <1% military. There are 909 aircraft based at this airport: 52% single-engine, 26% multi-engine, 16% jet and 5% helicopter.

== Airline and destinations ==
Airlines	Destinations
JSX	White Plains; Charter: Teterboro

== Accidents and incidents ==
- On June 12, 1979, Douglas DC-3D N427W of Bradley Aviation crashed shortly after take-off when take-off was attempted at too low an airspeed. Both crew were killed. The pilot did not have a rating to fly the DC-3, and the aircraft did not have a certificate of airworthiness.
- On February 3, 1981, a mid-air collision killed six people at Fort Lauderdale Executive Airport. Dale C. Hiatt and his father Alvia Hiatt were among those killed.
- On February 20, 2004, a Learjet 25B owned by Skylinks Jets overran runway 8 by about 1,750 feet (530 m). The aircraft touched down midway along the runway. A complete loss of brakes and a failed emergency drag-chute resulted in the aircraft overrunning the runway, crashing through the airport perimeter fence, across a four-lane highway and coming to a rest at a warehouse structure. The cause of the accident was the pilot-in-command's miscalculation of fuel needed and a failure of the flight crew to deploy the emergency drag-chute and main-gear brakes upon landing.
- June 23, 2004, two people were killed when a Piper Archer aircraft crashed shortly after take-off into a nearby warehouse. The aircraft had three occupants on board, and was en route to the Bahamas when the aircraft lost power and crashed through the roof of the business.
- On June 13, 2005, Douglas R4D-8 N3906J of Air Pony Express suffered an engine failure shortly after take-off on an international cargo flight to Marsh Harbour Airport, Marsh Harbour, Bahamas. The aircraft was written off when it was put down on a road in the Coral Ridge Isles neighborhood, hitting trees and a building and subsequently catching fire. The engine that failed had had maintenance work performed immediately before the accident flight.
- On August 1, 2007, a Piper PA-60 Aircraft lost one of its two engines shortly after takeoff from the airport. The aircraft crash landed onto NW 62nd Street immediately north of the airport while attempting to return for an emergency landing. All three people on board the aircraft escaped injury, but the aircraft was destroyed in the crash and subsequent fire that resulted due to the crash and fuel leak.
- On April 17, 2009, a Cessna 421 crashed shortly after take-off from the airport around 11:20 a.m. Local authorities stated the aircraft crashed into a vacant home located about two miles (3.2 km) from the airport. The aircraft was en route to Fernandina Beach, Florida near Jacksonville and was due to arrive at 13:00. The Federal Aviation Administration indicated that one person was on board the aircraft, and was killed in the accident. Sebring Air Charter of Tamarac, Florida was listed on FAA records as the owner of the aircraft. The probable cause of the accident was determined to be pilot error, with an inflight fire of the right engine as a contributing factor.
- December 28, 2011 a Cessna Citation jet overran the end of the runway 13 and ran through an airport perimeter security fence. Substantial damage occurred to the aircraft, with no fire or fuel leak occurring. No injuries occurred to the eight occupants as a result of the accident. The aircraft had originally taken off from Runway 26, but experienced mechanical difficulties, and the crew returned for a landing on Runway 13 for their emergency landing, and landed long on the runway, resulting in the overrun.
- March 15, 2013 three people were killed when a Piper PA-31 Navajo aircraft crashed shortly after takeoff into a parking lot of a business near the departure end of the runway 9. All three occupants of the aircraft were killed, and the cause of the crash was listed as pilot error.
- April 12, 2015 four people were killed when their Piper PA-31T Cheyenne reported a distress call for smoke in the aircraft upon approaching the airport for landing after taking off from Orlando. The aircraft crashed into a wildlife preserve just short of the airport, causing a large fire killing all on board.
- On August 21, 2021, a Gulfstream 4 suffered a nosewheel collapse on the takeoff roll. The aircraft skidded off the runway, and all 14 on board made it out with no injuries. Boxer Gervonta Davis was on board. The probable cause of the accident was found to be the two pilots' failure during preflight inspection to ensure that the nose landing gears pip pin was properly installed, which resulted in separation of the pip pin during takeoff.
- On November 10, 2025 a Beechcraft King Air aircraft owned by International Air Services that was heading to Jamaica for a humanitarian relief mission in the aftermath of Hurricane Melissa crashed into a pond in Coral Springs shortly after takeoff from the airport, killing two people.

== See also ==
- List of airports in Florida
