= Wilton Manors, Florida =

City in Florida, United States

- City
- City of Wilton Manors
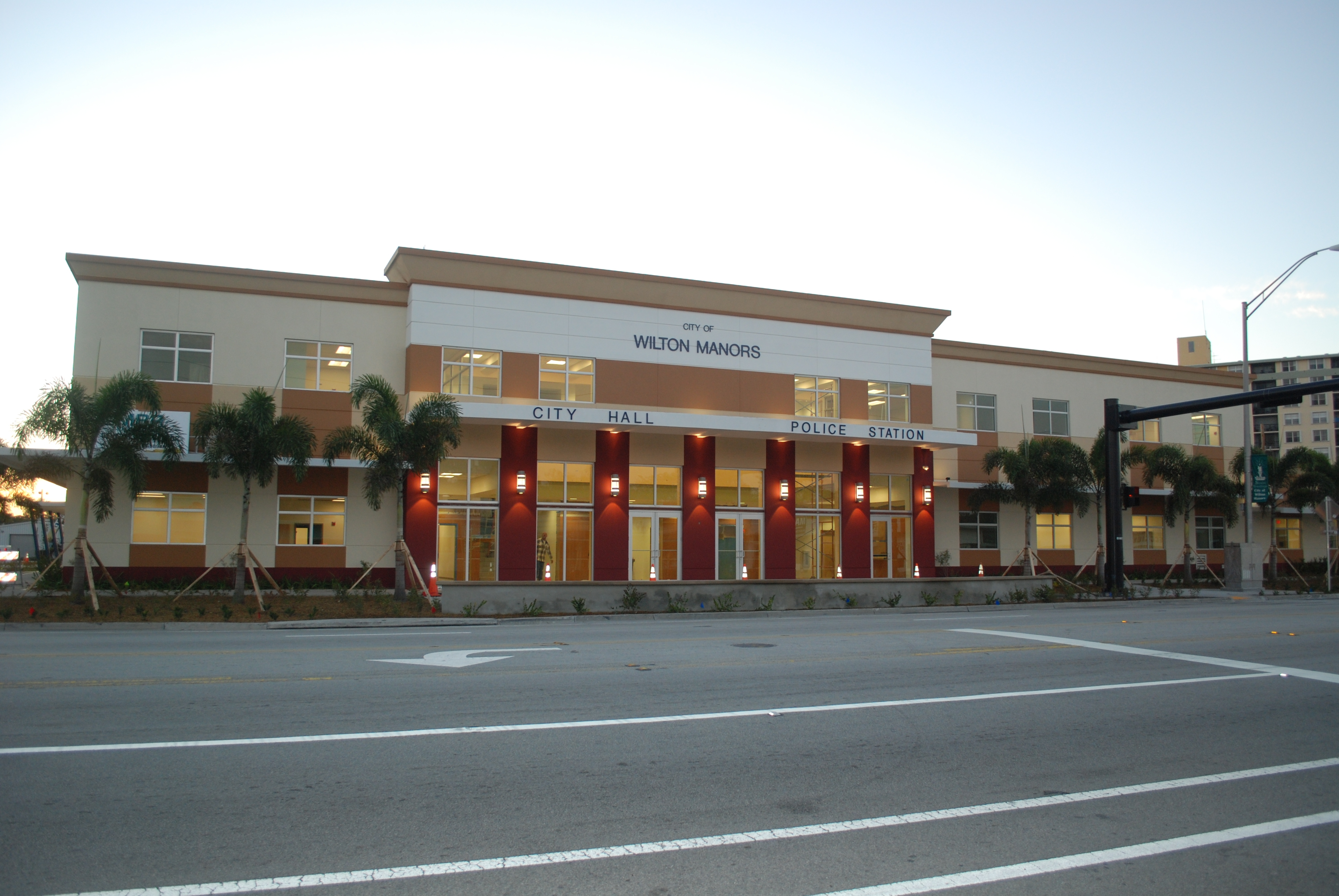
- Wilton Manors City Hall in 2010.

- Flag Seal Logo
- Nickname: The Island City. Tagline: Life's Just Better Here
- Location of Wilton Manors in Broward County, Florida

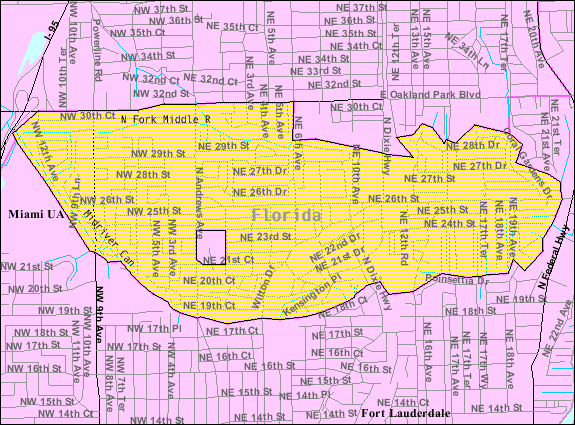
- U.S. Census Map
- Coordinates: 26°09′34″N 80°07′48″W
- Country: United States
- State: Florida
- County: Broward
- Settled (Colohatchee Settlement): Late 1800s – Early 1900s
- Incorporated (Village of Wilton Manors): May 13, 1947
- Incorporated (City of Wilton Manors): May 13, 1953

Government
  - Type: Commission-Manager

Area
  - Total: 1.97 sq mi (5.10 km^{2})
  - Land: 1.97 sq mi (5.10 km^{2})
  - Water: 0 sq mi (0.00 km^{2})
- Elevation: 7 ft (2.1 m)

Population (2020)
  - Total: 11,426
  - Density: 5,801/sq mi (2,239.7/km^{2})
- Time zone: UTC-5 (EST)
  - Summer (DST): UTC-4 (EDT)
- ZIP codes: 33305, 33306, 33311, 33334
- Area codes: 954, 754
- FIPS code: 12-78000
- GNIS feature ID: 2405760
- Website: wiltonmanors.gov

Wilton Manors is a city in Broward County, Florida, United States. Wilton Manors is part of the Miami metropolitan area, which was home to 6,166,488 people at the 2020 census. As of the 2020 census, the city had a population of 11,426.

== History ==
In the early 20th century, the area now known as Wilton Manors was known as Colohatchee. A train stop along the Florida East Coast Railroad near the current NE 24th Street shared that name. The name Wilton Manors was coined in 1925 by Ned Willingham, a Georgia transplant and land developer. Wilton Manors was incorporated in 1947.

The city is home to a sizable LGBT population and has become a destination for LGBT tourists, who frequent its many nightclubs and gay-owned businesses along the main street, Wilton Drive; the 2010 U.S. Census reported that it is second only to Provincetown, Massachusetts in the proportion (15%) of gay couples relative to the total population. It contains a large Pride Center, the World AIDS Museum and Educational Center, and a branch of the Stonewall National Museum and Archives, whose main facility is in neighboring Fort Lauderdale. A city web page highlights LGBT+ life in Wilton Manors. As of the November 2018 elections, Wilton Manors became the first city in Florida and only the second city in the United States to have an all-LGBT+ governing body.

Since the late 1990s, the Wilton Drive main street corridor has undergone an economic transformation. Formerly a sleepy street lined with small retail shops, Wilton Drive is now the city's arts and entertainment district, home to numerous restaurants, bars, shops, condos and rental developments that have blossomed over the last decade. Many of the businesses in the arts and entertainment district are LGBT-owned and/or operated, and "The Drive" has become a local, regional, and national destination for LGBT+ tourism. In late 2018, construction began on a "Complete Streets" project that will see wider sidewalks, on-street parking, buffered bike lines, and the reduction of vehicular lanes from four to two. Construction of the roadway portion of the project is projected to be completed in late 2019, followed by the landscaping portion of the project.

Another example of the economic revitalization in Wilton Manors is the Highland Estates neighborhood, bordered by NE 26th Street on the south, Dixie Highway on the east, the North Fork of the Middle River on the north, and NE 6th Avenue on the west, was significantly transformed in the decade from 1995 to 2005 from a blighted area to an upscale neighborhood with multiple new modern townhouse developments. Citywide real estate prices increased with, and even ahead of, the national trend in the years of the expansion of the housing bubble (2000–2007). In 2007, the city's taxable property values had grown to $1.26 billion, according to the Broward County Property Appraiser's office. Again following the national trend as the housing bubble burst, Wilton Manors real property taxable values fell 36% from 2007 through 2011. An upward trend in values resumed in 2012 and has continued through the present, with Wilton Manors consistently ranking in the top tier of cities in Broward County with the highest increases in taxable property values. According to the Broward County Property Appraiser, the city's 2019 taxable values are approximately $1.48 billion and total assessed market values are just over $2.22 billion.

Wilton Manors is home to several recreational facilities, the largest of which are Hagen Park, Richardson Historic Park and Nature Preserve, and Island City Park Preserve. Other Wilton Manors parks include Donn Eisele Park, Snook Creek Park and Boat Ramp, and Colohatchee Park, a 9.3 acres (38,000 m^{2}) recreational facility complete with a boardwalk for nature observation, a dog park, and a boat ramp for watercraft entry. In addition, there are several pocket parks throughout the city. Another major city park is Mickel Field, which was traditionally a busy hub for local baseball and softball leagues. At the request of the surrounding neighborhood residents, Mickel Field underwent a significant renovation and re-opened in Summer 2015 with new walking trails, fitness station, picnic and performance pavilion, and other new facilities more in tune with the needs of current residents. In 2019, a significant renovation was completed at Colohatchee Park.

=== 2021 Stonewall Pride Parade accident ===
On June 19, 2021, at the start of the Stonewall Pride Parade in Wilton Manors, a member of the Fort Lauderdale Gay Men's Chorus lost control of the truck he was driving, which was to be a part of the parade, and drove into other members of his group, killing 75-year-old James Fahy and injuring 2 others, one of whom was put into critical condition, before going on to strike a nearby garden store. The driver, identified as 77-year-old Fred Johnson Jr., narrowly missed U.S. Representative Debbie Wasserman Schultz, who was seated in a convertible at the time of the accident. The accident caused the parade to be canceled.

== Geography ==
According to the United States Census Bureau, the city has a total area of 1.94 square miles (5 km^{2}), all land.

Wilton Manors is bordered on the north by the North Fork of the Middle River and the city of Oakland Park; to the south, the boundaries include the South Fork of the Middle River and the city of Fort Lauderdale; the eastern terminus of the city limits extends to near Federal Highway (US 1); and the westernmost boundary reaches Interstate 95. Wilton Manors completely surrounds the separately incorporated village of Lazy Lake. Since it is surrounded by water, Wilton Manors has gained the nickname "Island City."

== Demographics ==
Historical population
Census	Pop.	Note	%±
1950	883		—
1960	8,257		835.1%
1970	10,948		32.6%
1980	12,742		16.4%
1990	11,804		−7.4%
2000	12,697		7.6%
2010	11,632		−8.4%
2020	11,426		−1.8%
U.S. Decennial Census

=== 2020 census ===
Wilton Manors racial composition (Hispanics excluded from racial categories) (NH = Non-Hispanic)
Race	Number	Percentage
White (NH)	7,683	67.24%
Black or African American (NH)	1,130	9.89%
Native American or Alaska Native (NH)	40	0.35%
Asian (NH)	290	2.54%
Pacific Islander or Native Hawaiian (NH)	4	0.04%
Some other race (NH)	68	0.60%
Two or more races/Multiracial (NH)	382	3.34%
Hispanic or Latino (any race)	1,829	16.01%
Total	11,426	

As of the 2020 census, Wilton Manors had a population of 11,426. The median age was 53.9 years. 6.7% of residents were under the age of 18 and 23.5% were 65 years of age or older. For every 100 females, there were 213.0 males, and for every 100 females age 18 and over, there were 225.6 males.

100.0% of residents lived in urban areas, while 0.0% lived in rural areas.

There were 6,235 households in Wilton Manors, of which 9.1% had children under the age of 18 living in them. Of all households, 27.6% were married-couple households, 42.4% were households with a male householder and no spouse or partner present, and 18.7% were households with a female householder and no spouse or partner present. About 46.4% of all households were made up of individuals, and 13.8% had someone living alone who was 65 years of age or older. There were 7,004 housing units, of which 11.0% were vacant. The homeowner vacancy rate was 1.5% and the rental vacancy rate was 9.2%.

=== 2020 ACS 5-year estimates ===
In 2020 ACS 5-year estimates, there were 2,272 families in the city.

=== 2010 census ===
Wilton Manors Demographics
2010 Census	Wilton Manors	Broward County	Florida
Total population	11,632	1,748,066	18,801,310
Population, percent change, 2000 to 2010	–8.4%	+7.7%	+17.6%
Population density	5,942.7/sq mi	1,444.9/sq mi	350.6/sq mi
White or Caucasian (including White Hispanic)	80.8%	63.1%	75.0%
(Non-Hispanic White or Caucasian)	71.2%	43.5%	57.9%
Black or African-American	12.4%	26.7%	16.0%
Hispanic or Latino (of any race)	12.9%	25.1%	22.5%
Asian	2.2%	3.2%	2.4%
Native American or Native Alaskan	0.3%	0.3%	0.4%
Pacific Islander or Native Hawaiian	0.0%	0.1%	0.1%
Two or more races (Multiracial)	1.9%	2.9%	2.5%
Some Other Race	2.4%	3.7%	3.6%

As of the 2010 United States census, there were 11,632 people, 5,975 households, and 1,953 families residing in the city.

Wilton Manors is known as a gay village. As of 2010, Wilton Manors ranks 2nd in the U.S. for its percentage of gay couples as a proportion of total population, with 140 gay couples per 1,000 residents or 1,600 persons or 14% of the inhabitants. The Fort Lauderdale area ranks 4th in metro areas (per capita). Neighboring Oakland Park is ranked sixth on the list. Wilton Manors has approximately 1270% more resident gay couples per capita than the national average of 1.1% of the population, as of 2010.

=== 2000 census ===
In 2000, 18.1% had children under the age of 18 living with them, 28.4% were married couples living together, 9.0% had a female householder with no husband present, and 58.0% were non-families. 40.7% of all households were made up of individuals, and 9.7% had someone living alone who was 65 years of age or older. The average household size was 2.06 and the average family size was 2.91.

In 2000, the city the population was spread out, with 16.6% under the age of 18, 6.3% from 18 to 24, 36.4% from 25 to 44, 25.0% from 45 to 64, and 15.7% who were 65 years of age or older. The median age was 40 years. For every 100 females, there were 123.7 males. For every 100 females age 18 and over, there were 128.2 males.

In 2000, the median income for a household in the city was $38,366, and the median income for a family was $43,346. Males had a median income of $31,857 versus $26,522 for females. The per capita income for the city was $21,770. About 10.7% of families and 15.4% of the population were below the poverty line, including 25.3% of those under age 18 and 13.4% of those age 65 or over.

As of 2000, speakers of English as a first language accounted for 78.52% of the population, while Spanish was at 9.37%, French Creole at 7.13%, French at 2.31%, Italian at 1.22%, as well as Portuguese being at 0.68%, German being 0.55%, and Polish as a mother tongue of 0.17% of all residents.

As of 2000, Wilton Manors was the 133rd most Cuban-populated area in the US (tied with Hasbrouck Heights, New Jersey) at 1.58% of the population, while it had the twenty-seventh highest percentage of Haitians in the US, (tied with North Lauderdale and Florida City) at 6.7% of all residents.

== Government ==
Previous Presidential Elections Results
Year	Republican	Democratic	Third Parties
2020	21.26% 1,629	78.18% 5,989	0.56% 43
2016	21.77% 1,514	76.08% 5,292	2.16% 150
2012	24.45% 1,583	74.27% 4,808	1.3% 85
2008	24.89% 1,637	74.12% 4,874	0.99% 65

Since the early 2000s Wilton Manors has voted overwhelmingly Democratic, higher than the state and county average. This is largely due to the city's large LGBT population and minority residents. In 2018 the city became the second city in the United States (after Palm Springs, California) to have a gay mayor and all-LGBT city commission.

The city holds nonpartisan elections to elect city officials.

== Media ==
Wilton Manors is part of the Miami-Fort Lauderdale-Hollywood media market, which is the twelfth largest radio market and the seventeenth largest television market in the United States. Its primary daily newspapers are the South Florida Sun-Sentinel and The Miami Herald, and their Spanish-language counterparts El Sentinel and El Nuevo Herald. A number of LGBT+ publications also serve the community; including OutSFL, The Mirror, OutClique, and Hot Spots.

In 2010 Wilton Manors Main Street (now Wilton Manors Development alliance) aided Brazos Films in the production of episode seven of their award-winning series One Square Mile.

== Education ==
=== Primary and secondary schools ===
Broward County Public Schools operates public schools. Most portions are zoned to Wilton Manors Elementary, while some are zoned to Bennett Elementary School. All residential areas are zoned to Sunrise Middle School, and Fort Lauderdale High School.

In addition the community is in the service area of the magnet school Pompano Beach High School.

There is also an area charter school in Wilton Manors, Somerset Academy Village.

The Roman Catholic Archdiocese of Miami previously operated the Saint Clement School in Wilton Manors. It opened in the 1950s and closed in 2009. According to Akilah Johnson of the South Florida Sun Sentinel, area parents indicated that St. Ambrose School in Deerfield Beach and St. Jerome's Catholic School in Fort Lauderdale would take most of the students who could not go to Saint Clement anymore.

=== Libraries ===
Wilton Manors' first library opened on June 24, 1957, as a project of the Jayceettes and staffed by volunteers. "The city took over the library in August 1958... and moved the library to the original city hall. In 1960, the building was enlarged to double its space." In 2003, construction was completed on a 4,000 sq ft (370 m^{2}) library expansion. This increased the facility's size to 6,500 square feet (600 m^{2}). The library, now called the Richard C. Sullivan Public Library of Wilton Manors, is not a part of the Broward County Library system. It is one of only five municipal libraries in Broward County. The Richard C. Sullivan Public Library is a heavily used facility. The volunteer organization, Friends of the Wilton Manors Public Library, actively supports the library's collections and programming.

== See also ==
- LGBT culture in Miami
