= 2018 Fort Lauderdale mayoral election =

- March 13, 2018
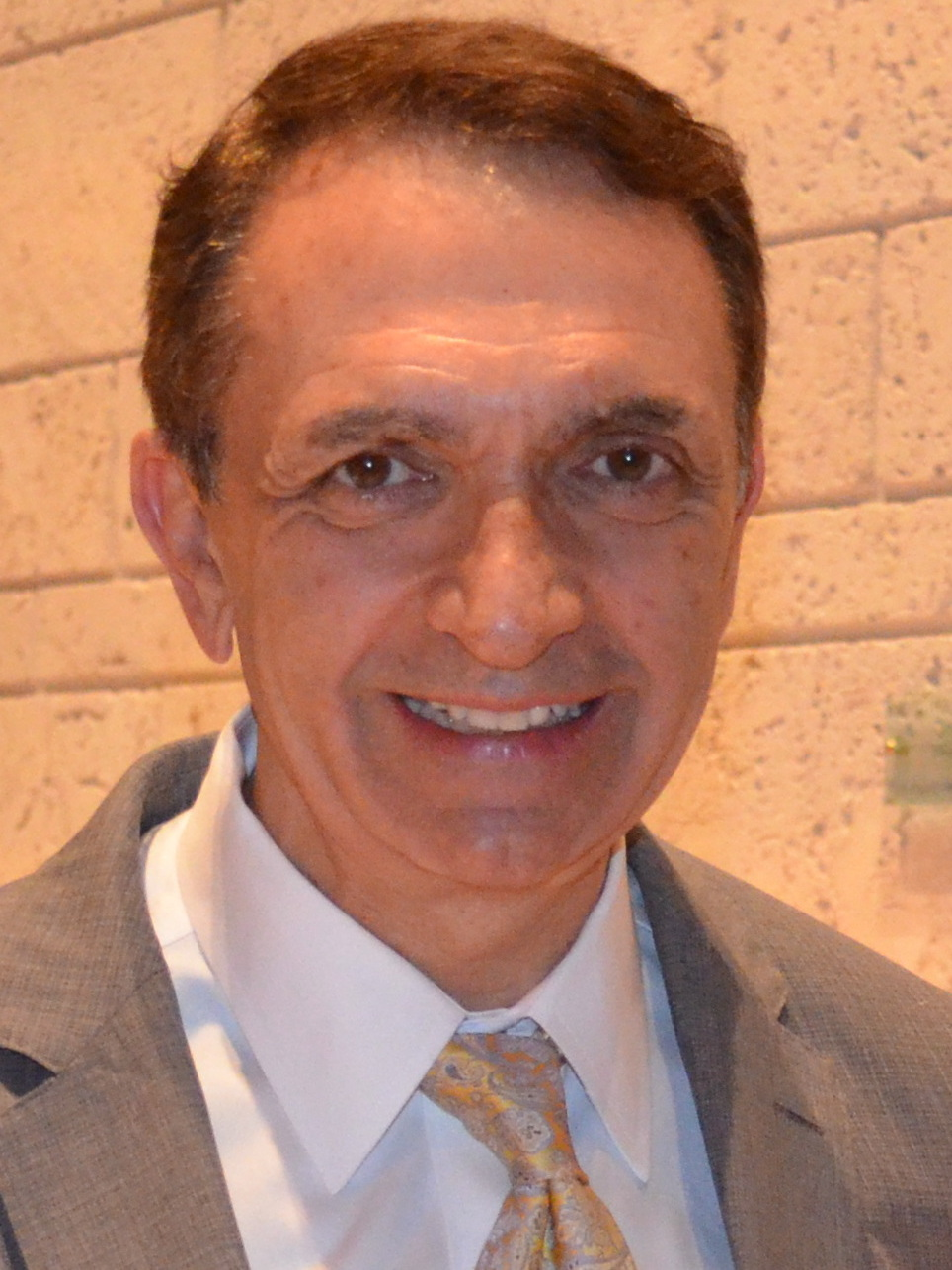

Candidate	Dean Trantalis	Bruce Roberts	Charlotte Rodstrom
First round	7,805; 46.28%	5,270; 31.25%	3,789; 22.47%
Runoff	12,908; 64.57%	7,084; 35.43%	Eliminated
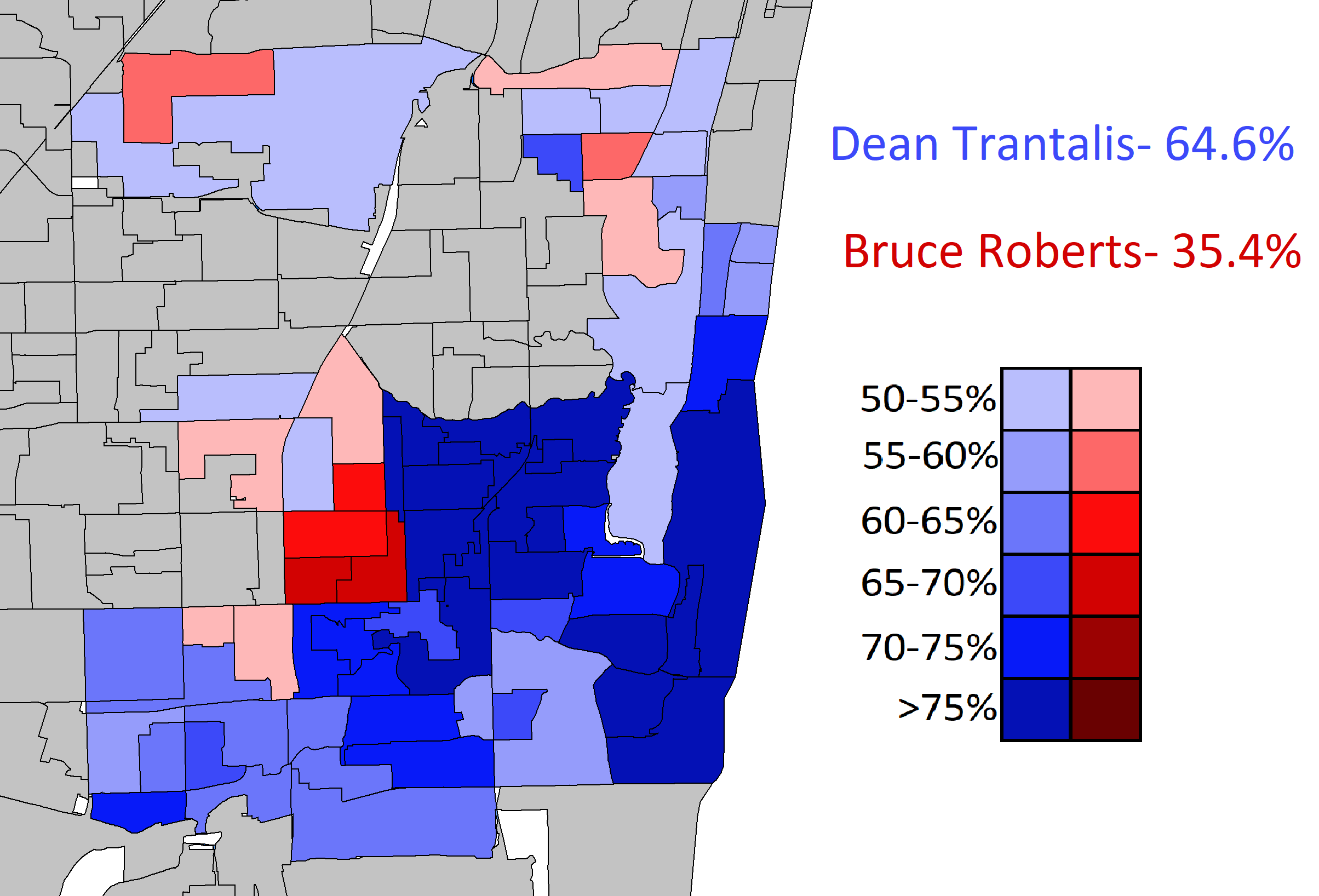
Mayor before election
Jack Seiler
Nonpartisan
Elected Mayor
Dean Trantalis
Nonpartisan

The 2018 Fort Lauderdale mayoral election took place on March 13, 2018, following a primary election on January 16, 2018. Incumbent Mayor Jack Seiler was term-limited and could not seek a fourth term. Three candidates ran to succeed him: City Commissioner Dean Trantalis, who ran against Seiler for Mayor in 2009; City Commissioner Bruce Roberts, who also served as the city's former police chief; and former City Commissioner Charlotte Rodstrom.

Trantalis placed first in the primary election with 46 percent of the vote, but did not receive a majority, so he proceeded to a runoff election with Roberts, who received 31 percent. In the runoff election, Trantalis defeated Roberts by a wide margin, winning 65 percent of the vote, becoming the city's first openly gay mayor.

== Primary election ==
=== Candidates ===
- Dean Trantalis, City Commissioner, 2009 candidate for Mayor
- Bruce Roberts, City Commissioner, former Police Chief
- Charlotte Rodstrom, former City Commissioner

=== Results ===
Primary election results
Party	Candidate	Votes	%
Nonpartisan	Dean Trantalis	7,805	46.28%
Nonpartisan	Bruce Roberts	5,270	31.25%
Nonpartisan	Charlotte Rodstrom	3,789	22.47%
Total votes		16,864	100.00%

== Runoff election ==
=== Results ===
2018 Fort Lauderdale mayoral election results
Party	Candidate	Votes	%
Nonpartisan	Dean Trantalis	12,908	64.57%
Nonpartisan	Bruce Roberts	7,084	35.43%
Total votes		19,992	100.00%
