= 2024 Fort Lauderdale mayoral election =

- November 5, 2024
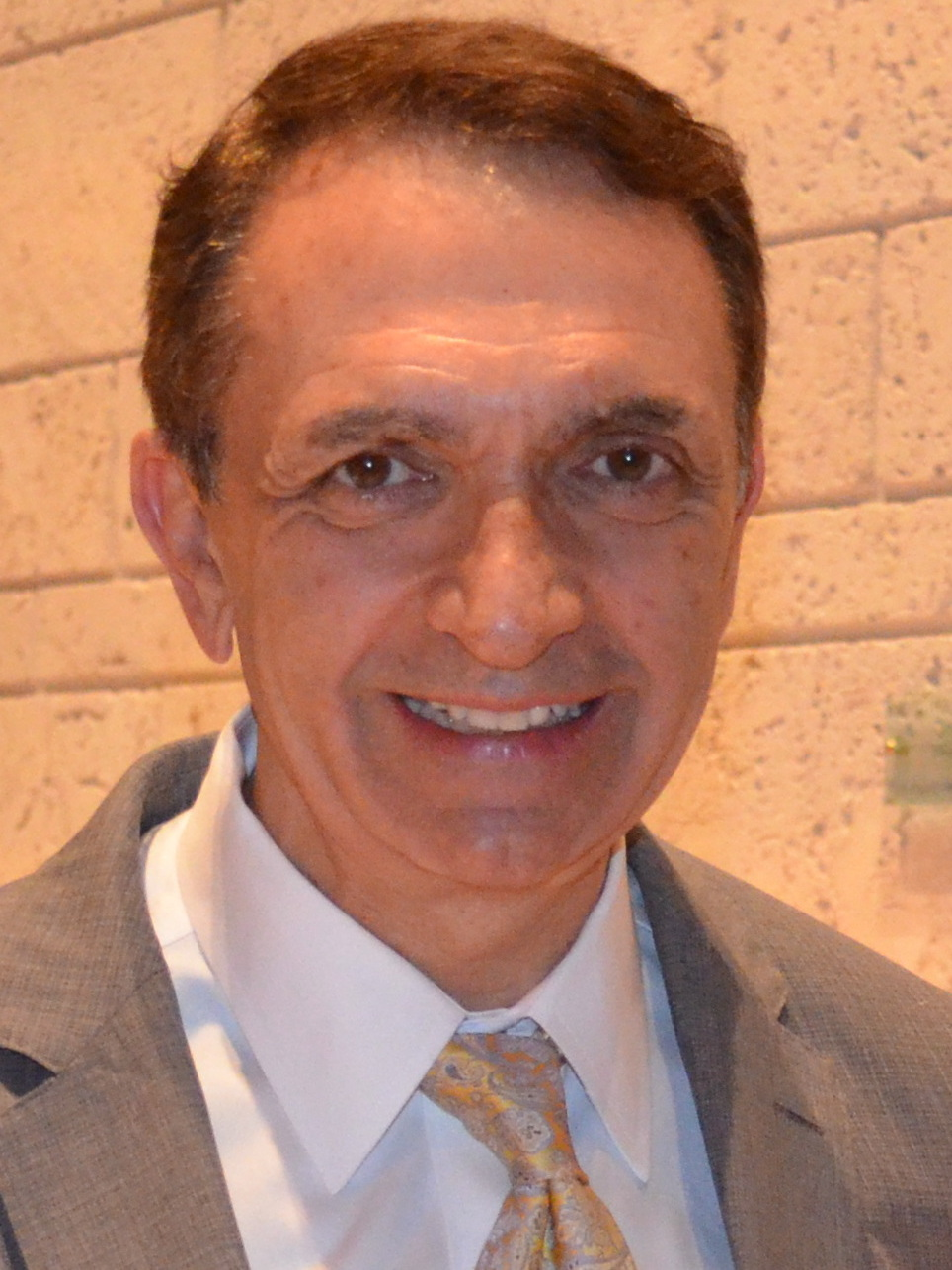

Candidate	Dean Trantalis	Barbra Anne Stern	Kenneth Cooper
Popular vote	30,077	25,708	10,984
Percentage	38.39%	32.81%	14.02%
Mayor before election
Dean Trantalis
Nonpartisan
Elected Mayor
Dean Trantalis
Nonpartisan

The 2024 Fort Lauderdale mayoral election took place on November 5, 2024. Incumbent Mayor Dean Trantalis ran for re-election to a third term. He faced a crowded field of challengers, including attorney Barbra Stern and Kenneth Cooper, his 2020 opponent. Trantalis won re-election, but with a plurality of the vote, receiving 38 percent of the vote to Stern's 33 percent and Cooper's 14 percent.

== General election ==
=== Candidates ===
- Dean Trantalis, incumbent Mayor
- Barbra Stern, attorney, 2010 Democratic nominee for the State House
- Kenneth Cooper, attorney, 2020 candidate for Mayor
- Jim Lewis, attorney, perennial candidate
- Chris Nelson, activist, conspiracy theorist, conservative writer (dropped out)

=== Results ===
2024 Fort Lauderdale mayoral election results
Party	Candidate	Votes	%
Nonpartisan	Dean Trantalis (inc.)	30,077	38.39%
Nonpartisan	Barbra Anne Stern	25,708	32.81%
Nonpartisan	Kenneth Cooper	10,984	14.02%
Nonpartisan	Jim Lewis	7,472	9.54%
Nonpartisan	Chris Nelson	4,106	5.24%
Total votes		78,347	100.00%
