= 2015 Fort Lauderdale mayoral election =

- February 10, 2015
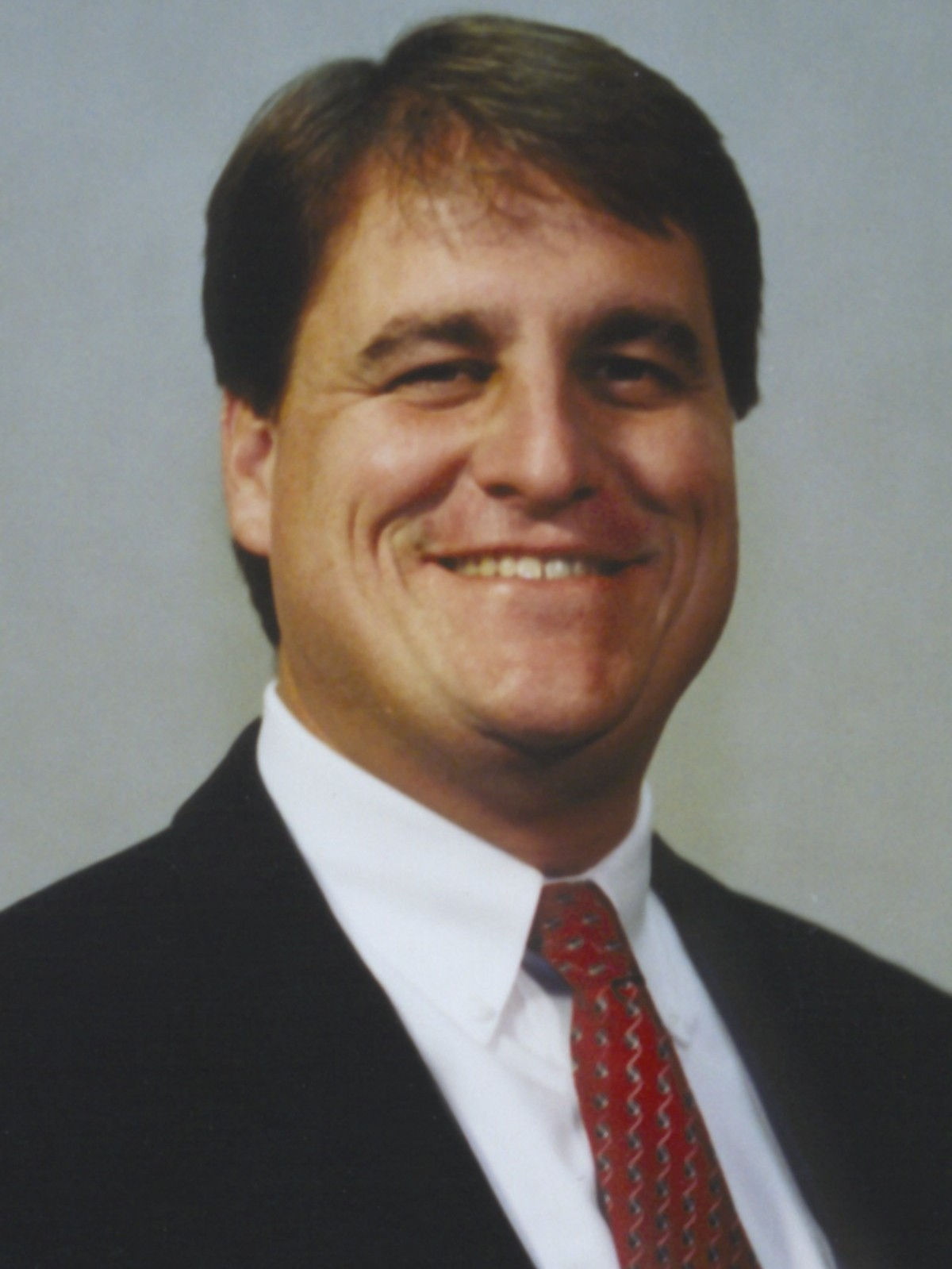

Candidate	Jack Seiler	Chris Brennan	Earl Rynerson
Popular vote	5,438	1,226	1,226
Percentage	70.67%	15.93%	13.40%
Mayor before election
Jack Seiler
Nonpartisan
Elected Mayor
Jack Seiler
Nonpartisan

The 2015 Fort Lauderdale mayoral election took place on February 10, 2015. Incumbent Mayor Jack Seiler ran for re-election to a third term. He was challenged by bartender Chris Brennan and tile company owner Earl Rynerson, who previously ran against Seiler in 2009 and 2012. In a low-visibility election, Seiler defeated both in a landslide, winning 71 percent of the vote.

== Primary election ==
=== Candidates ===
- Jack Seiler, incumbent Mayor
- Chris Brennan, bartender, environmental activist
- Earl Rynerson, tile company owner, 2009 and 2012 candidate for Mayor

=== Results ===
2015 Fort Lauderdale mayoral election results
Party	Candidate	Votes	%
Nonpartisan	Jack Seiler (inc.)	5,438	70.67%
Nonpartisan	Chris Brennan	1,226	15.93%
Nonpartisan	Earl Rynerson	1,031	13.40%
Total votes		7,695	100.00%
