= 2020 Fort Lauderdale mayoral election =

- November 3, 2020
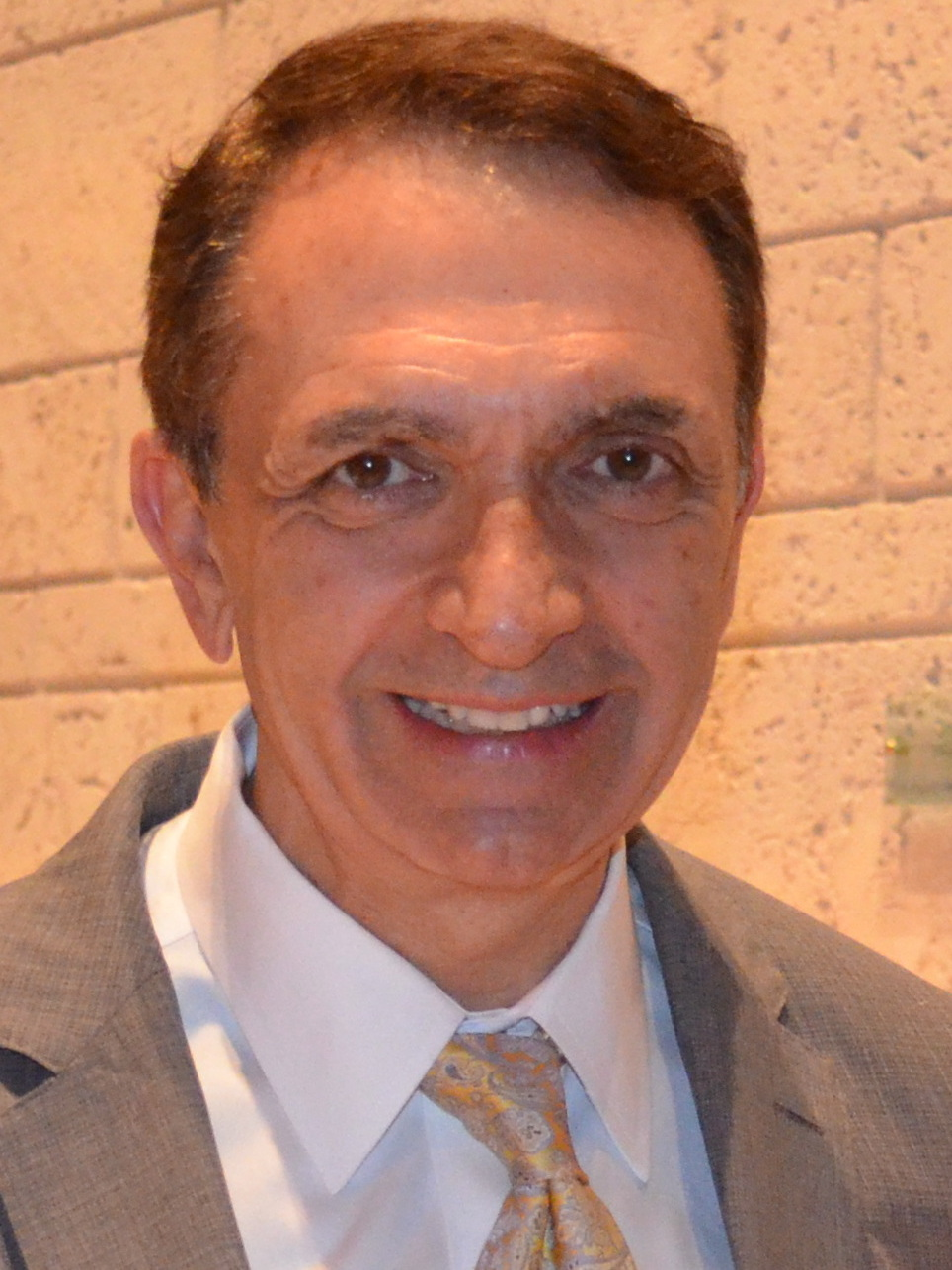

Candidate	Dean Trantalis	Kenneth Cooper
Popular vote	49,388	36,568
Percentage	57.46%	42.54%
- Precinct results Trantalis: 50–60% 60–70% 70–80% Cooper: 50–60% No votes
Mayor before election
Dean Trantalis
Nonpartisan
Elected Mayor
Dean Trantalis
Nonpartisan

The 2020 Fort Lauderdale mayoral election took place on November 3, 2020. A 2019 amendment to the city charter eliminated municipal primary elections, lengthened the Mayor's term of office from three to four years, and aligned mayoral elections with presidential elections, beginning with the 2020 election.

Incumbent Mayor Dean Trantalis ran for re-election to a second term, and was challenged by attorney Kenneth Cooper. Trantalis was endorsed by the Sun Sentinel, which praised him as "far more capable and qualified than Cooper."

Trantalis defeated Cooper by a wide margin, winning re-election with 57 percent of the vote. However, after the election, Cooper contested his loss, filing a lawsuit that argued that the mail-in ballots cast in the election should not be counted. In March 2021, Cooper dropped the lawsuit.

== General election ==
=== Candidates ===
- Dean Trantalis, incumbent Mayor
- Kenneth Cooper, attorney

=== Results ===
2020 Fort Lauderdale mayoral election results
Party	Candidate	Votes	%
Nonpartisan	Dean Trantalis (inc.)	49,388	57.46%
Nonpartisan	Kenneth Cooper	36,568	42.54%
Total votes		85,956	100.00%
