= 2000 Fort Lauderdale mayoral election =

- March 14, 2000
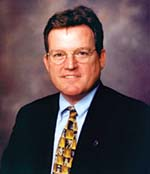

Candidate	Jim Naugle	Anthony G. Evans, Jr.
Popular vote	17,857	4,590
Percentage	79.55%	20.45%
Mayor before election
Jim Naugle
Nonpartisan
Elected Mayor
Jim Naugle
Nonpartisan

The 2000 Fort Lauderdale mayoral election took place on March 14, 2000. Incumbent Mayor Jim Naugle ran for re-election to a fourth term. He was only challenged by Anthony G. Evans Jr., a minister and pharmacy manager.

Naugle was endorsed for re-election by the Miami Herald and the Sun Sentinel. The Sentinel noted that "Naugle's brand of populism has played well with the voters of Fort Lauderdale," and the Herald observed that he "has taken a conservative approach to redevelopment, serving as a questioning voice even when he cannot build a consensus,"

Naugle ultimately defeated Evans in a landslide, winning re-election with 80 percent of the vote.

== Primary election ==
=== Candidates ===
- Jim Naugle, incumbent Mayor
- Anthony G. Evans Jr., minister, pharmacy manager

=== Results ===
2000 Fort Lauderdale mayoral election results
Party	Candidate	Votes	%
Nonpartisan	Jim Naugle (inc.)	17,857	79.55%
Nonpartisan	Anthony G. Evans, Jr.	4,590	20.45%
Total votes		22,447	100.00%
