= 1994 Fort Lauderdale mayoral election =

- March 8, 1994
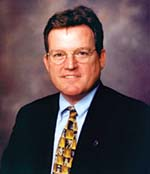

Nominee	Jim Naugle	Jim Lewis
Party	Nonpartisan	Nonpartisan
Popular vote	12,746	3,422
Percentage	78.83%	21.17%
Mayor before election
Jim Naugle
Nonpartisan
Elected Mayor
Jim Naugle
Nonpartisan

The 1994 Fort Lauderdale mayoral election took place on March 8, 1994. Incumbent Mayor Jim Naugle, who was first elected in 1991, ran for re-election to a second term. He was challenged by attorney Jim Lewis and landlord Angelo Diamond, which initially scheduled the election for February 8 and a general election, if needed, for March 8. However, after Diamond dropped out and only two candidates remained on the ballot, the February 8 primary was cancelled.

Naugle entered the race as the clear frontrunner, and raised significantly more money than did Lewis, who faced allegations that he did not meet the residency requirements to run in the election. Both the Miami Herald and the Sun Sentinel endorsed Naugle for re-election.

In the end, Naugle defeated Lewis in a landslide, winning re-election with 79 percent of the vote.

== General election ==
=== Candidates ===
- Jim Naugle, incumbent Mayor
- Jim Lewis, attorney, 1992 candidate for 17th Judicial Circuit Public Defender

==== Dropped out ====
- Angelo Diamond, landlord

=== Results ===
1994 Fort Lauderdale mayoral election results
Party	Candidate	Votes	%
Nonpartisan	Jim Naugle (inc.)	12,746	78.83%
Nonpartisan	Jim Lewis	3,422	21.17%
Total votes		16,168	100.00%
