= Robert O. Cox =

American politician

Robert O. Cox (November 28, 1917 – June 22, 2013) was mayor of Fort Lauderdale, Florida from 1986-1991. Before becoming mayor, Cox spent nearly two decades on the City Commission. Cox owned a local marina.

== Role in making Fort Lauderdale a "marine capital" ==
Before being elected to the City Commission, Cox served on the city's Marine Advisory Board and is often credited for his role in promoting the city as a boating capital. As a member of the Board he encouraged the city to deepen many then-shallow canals, build marinas and advertise the city's boating-related amenities. Later, as a City Commissioner, Cox was instrumental in luring the Whitbread Round the World Race (now known as the Volvo Ocean Race), a leading yacht race, to the city.

== The end of spring break ==
As a Commissioner and later as Mayor, Cox was a leader in the effort to discourage college students from spending spring break in the city.

== Accusations of racism and other controversies ==
Cox declined to seek reelection as mayor following a controversy that erupted after he told a fourth-grade class at Edgewood Elementary School in Fort Lauderdale that all they needed to become mayor was to be "free, white, and 21." Edgewood Elementary principal Collins Plummer moments later requested clarification of the earlier comment by Mayor Cox. Mr. Cox then proceeded an attempt at backtracking by stating that the comment was an old cliche which no longer held true due to advances in rights and opportunities for minorities during his lifetime. Many of the students witnessing the exchange including fourth grader Rafael Bazan were offended by Mayor Cox's remarks and the clarification by the Mayor did little to ease the surprise and offense by all whom witnessed the exchange. Mayor Cox's remarks were played on local news over the next several days causing an uproar from minorities throughout the community. Talk show host Arsenio Hall criticized Cox for these comments. Indeed, this was not the first time Cox made statements and took positions that were perceived by many to be racially insensitive. For example, Cox opposed renaming Southwest 31st Avenue Martin Luther King Jr. Boulevard. He also opposed making King's birthday a city holiday. He once accused black people of vandalizing his warehouse. He argued against single-member voting districts when the federal government demanded them. Further, he suggested English be the city's official language.

However, Cox's record on race was less clear-cut than these comments and viewpoints suggest. Cox was a progressive on several race-related issues. It was Cox who, in 1972, proposed the city's open housing ordinance after the Broward County Commission failed to pass one. He did so in the face of strong opposition from influential white residents on the city's east side. Notably, former mayor and congressman E. Clay Shaw, Jr., a far less divisive figure than Cox in ensuing years, opposed this ordinance. Further, in 1970, Cox was the only commissioner to vote against a $43,000 armored tank the city bought following race riots. Cox argued it was meant to be turned on a tiny faction of the black community and contended that the money would have been better spent in community relations. Though Cox opposed the district elections that eventually made black businessman Carlton Moore a commissioner. Cox feared districts would divide the city and make commissioners responsive only to their constituents. However, when the measure passed, Cox encouraged Moore to run.

In 1981, while serving as a city commissioner, Cox attracted controversy when he suggested pouring Kerosene in trash cans to prevent the homeless from rummaging for food. Although he later said that he has meant to say bleach, as he did not want to kill anyone, "his comment captured for many the official attitude toward the scruffy souls whose presence marred the city's image".

He died at his Chaumont, New York summer home in 2013.

== See also ==
- List of mayors of Fort Lauderdale

Political offices
Preceded by Robert A. Dressler	Mayor of Fort Lauderdale; 1986-1991	Succeeded by Jim Naugle
