= 2012 Fort Lauderdale mayoral election =

- January 31, 2012
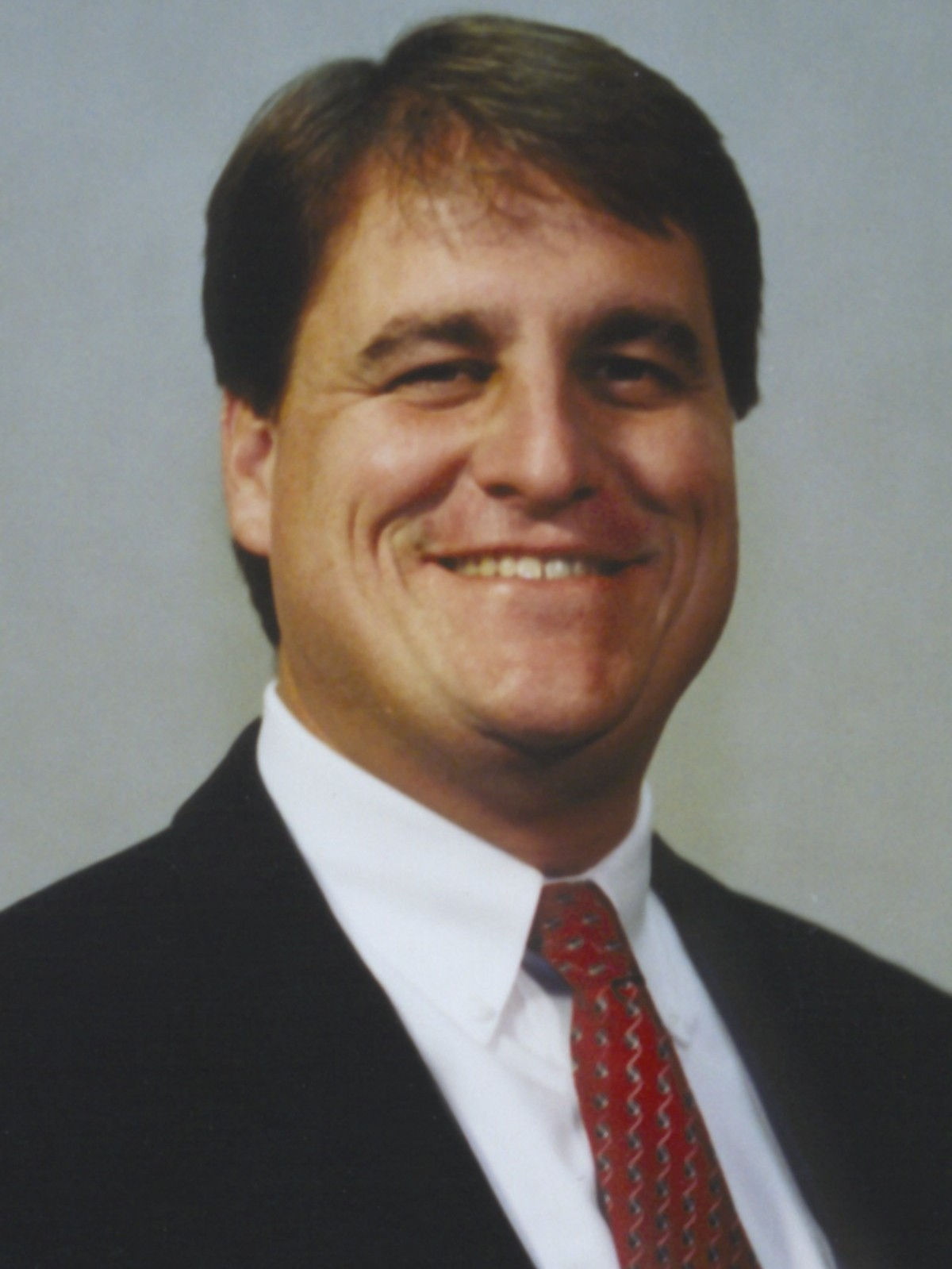

Candidate	Jack Seiler	Earl Rynerson
Popular vote	12,000	3,253
Percentage	75.03%	20.34%
Mayor before election
Jack Seiler
Nonpartisan
Elected Mayor
Jack Seiler
Nonpartisan

The 2012 Fort Lauderdale mayoral election took place on January 31, 2012. Incumbent Mayor Jack Seiler ran for re-election to a second term, and was challenged by Earl Rynerson, the owner of a tile company who lost to Seiler in 2009. Rynerson recruited a third candidate, construction worker Gabriel Crimi, which rescheduled the election from March 13, 2012, to the date of the Republican presidential primary. Seiler defeated both candidates in a landslide, winning 75 percent of the vote.

== Primary election ==
=== Candidates ===
- Jack Seiler, incumbent Mayor
- Earl Rynerson, tile company owner, 2009 candidate for Mayor
- Gabriel Crimi, construction worker

=== Results ===
2012 Fort Lauderdale mayoral election results
Party	Candidate	Votes	%
Nonpartisan	Jack Seiler (inc.)	12,000	75.03%
Nonpartisan	Earl Rynerson	3,253	20.34%
Nonpartisan	Gabriel Crimi	741	4.63%
Total votes		15,994	100.00%
