= George Mathews =

George Mathews may refer to:

- George Mathews (Georgia politician) (1739–1812), U.S. General and Governor of Georgia
- George Mathews (judge) (1774–1836), Chief Justice of the Louisiana Supreme Court
- George A. Mathews (1852–1941), Delegate from Dakota Territory to the United States House of Representatives
- George G. Mathews Jr. (1855–1944), American diplomat and politician
- George Ballard Mathews (1861–1922), English mathematician
- George W. Mathews (1874–1906), Medal of Honor recipient
- George C. Mathews (1886–1946), American economist
- George Mathews (actor) (1911–1984), American actor

== See also ==
- Geevarghese Mor Coorilose or George Mathews Nalunnakkal (born 1965), Syriac Orthodox bishop
- George Matthews (disambiguation)
