= 2003 Fort Lauderdale mayoral election =

- February 11, 2003
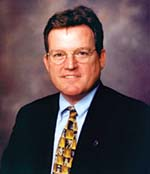

| Candidate | Jim Naugle | Tim Smith |
| Popular vote | 10,924 | 6,502 |
| Percentage | 61.24% | 36.45% |
Mayor before election
Jim Naugle
Nonpartisan
Elected Mayor
Jim Naugle
Nonpartisan

The 2003 Fort Lauderdale mayoral election took place on February 11, 2003. Incumbent Mayor Jim Naugle ran for re-election to a fifth term, and was challenged by City Commissioner Tim Smith. Naugle, a Democrat, frustrated local Democrats when he endorsed Republican Governor Jeb Bush for re-election in 2002, but Smith attracted little formal support from Democratic leaders. Naugle ultimately defeated Smith by a wide margin, winning 61 percent of the vote.

== Primary election ==
=== Candidates ===
- Jim Naugle, incumbent Mayor
- Tim Smith, City Commissioner
- Gene Ingles, minister, businessman

=== Campaign ===
On September 20, 2002, Smith announced that he would challenge Naugle for re-election, arguing for greater development, and criticizing Naugle's "anti-gay remarks." Naugle, on the other hand, attacked Smith for being overly friendly to developers, and that gay residents "like the fact that I don't vote for all the big towers."

Throughout the campaign, Smith criticized Naugle for his treatment of city employees. Naugle noted that though he was not "an easy person to work for," he believed that "we're all public servants, and we work hard."

The Miami Herald endorsed Smith over Naugle, noting that Naugle's "accomplishments are undermined by his failure to adjust his old-school politics to the broadly diverse community that Fort Lauderdale has become." It criticized his hostility to the city's gay community and for "tolerat[ing] for years the racially discriminatory culture within city government that recently led to a federally mandated consent decree." The Herald praised Smith as "[r]eform-minded" and a "self-starter on community development" with a vision that "is one of inclusiveness for all the city's residents."

The Sun Sentinel, on the other hand, endorsed Naugle for re-election, praising Smith as "an extremely effective commissioner," but noting that "Naugle's strong performance as mayor gives him the edge." The Sentinel noted that Naugle "deserves some credit" for the city's transformation from "a haven for college spring-break revelers from around the country" to "a thriving modern city catering primarily to a different brand of tourists: families."

=== Results ===
2003 Fort Lauderdale mayoral election results
| Party | Candidate | Votes | % |
|---|---|---|---|
| Nonpartisan | Jim Naugle (inc.) | 10,924 | 61.24% |
| Nonpartisan | Tim Smith | 6,502 | 36.45% |
| Nonpartisan | Gene Ingles | 413 | 2.32% |
| Total votes | | 17,839 | 100.00% |
