= 2006 Fort Lauderdale mayoral election =

- February 14, 2006
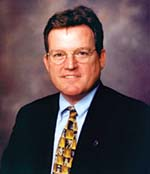

Candidate	Jim Naugle	Dan Lewis
Popular vote	6,622	3,173
Percentage	64.49%	30.90%
Mayor before election
Jim Naugle
Nonpartisan
Elected Mayor
Jim Naugle
Nonpartisan

The 2006 Fort Lauderdale mayoral election took place on February 14, 2006. Incumbent Mayor Jim Naugle ran for re-election to a sixth term. He was challenged by former Miramar City Commissioner Dan Lewis, a political consultant. Naugle defeated Lewis in a landslide, winning re-election with 64 percent of the vote.

== Primary election ==
=== Candidates ===
- Jim Naugle, incumbent Mayor
- Dan Lewis, political consultant, former Miramar City Commissioner
- Christopher James Peer, financial consultant

==== Declined ====
- Charlotte Rodstrom, former member of the City Planning and Zoning Board

=== Results ===
2006 Fort Lauderdale mayoral election results
Party	Candidate	Votes	%
Nonpartisan	Jim Naugle (inc.)	6,622	64.49%
Nonpartisan	Dan Lewis	3,173	30.90%
Nonpartisan	Christopher James Peer	473	4.61%
Total votes		10,268	100.00%
