= 2009 Fort Lauderdale mayoral election =

- February 10, 2009
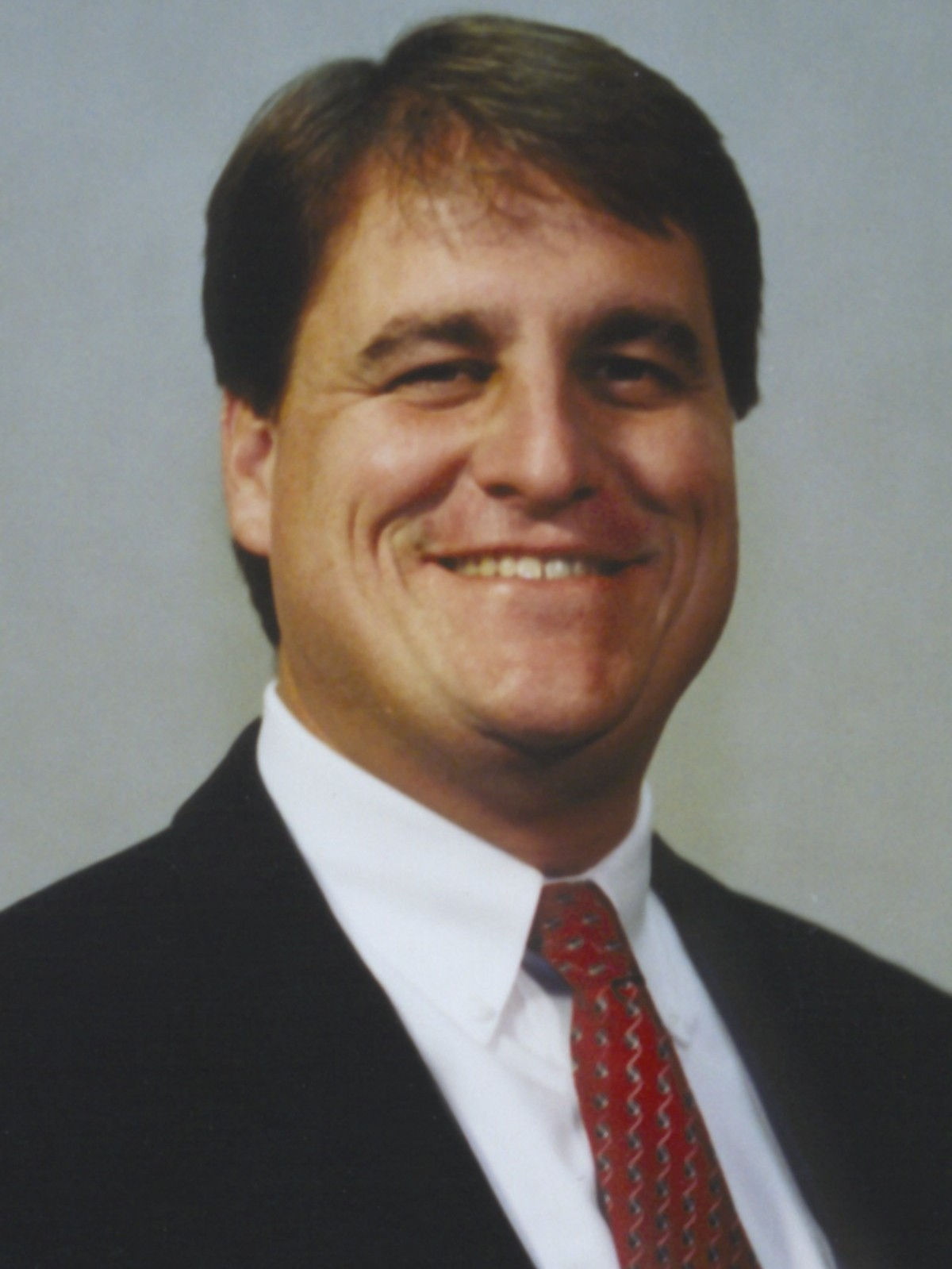

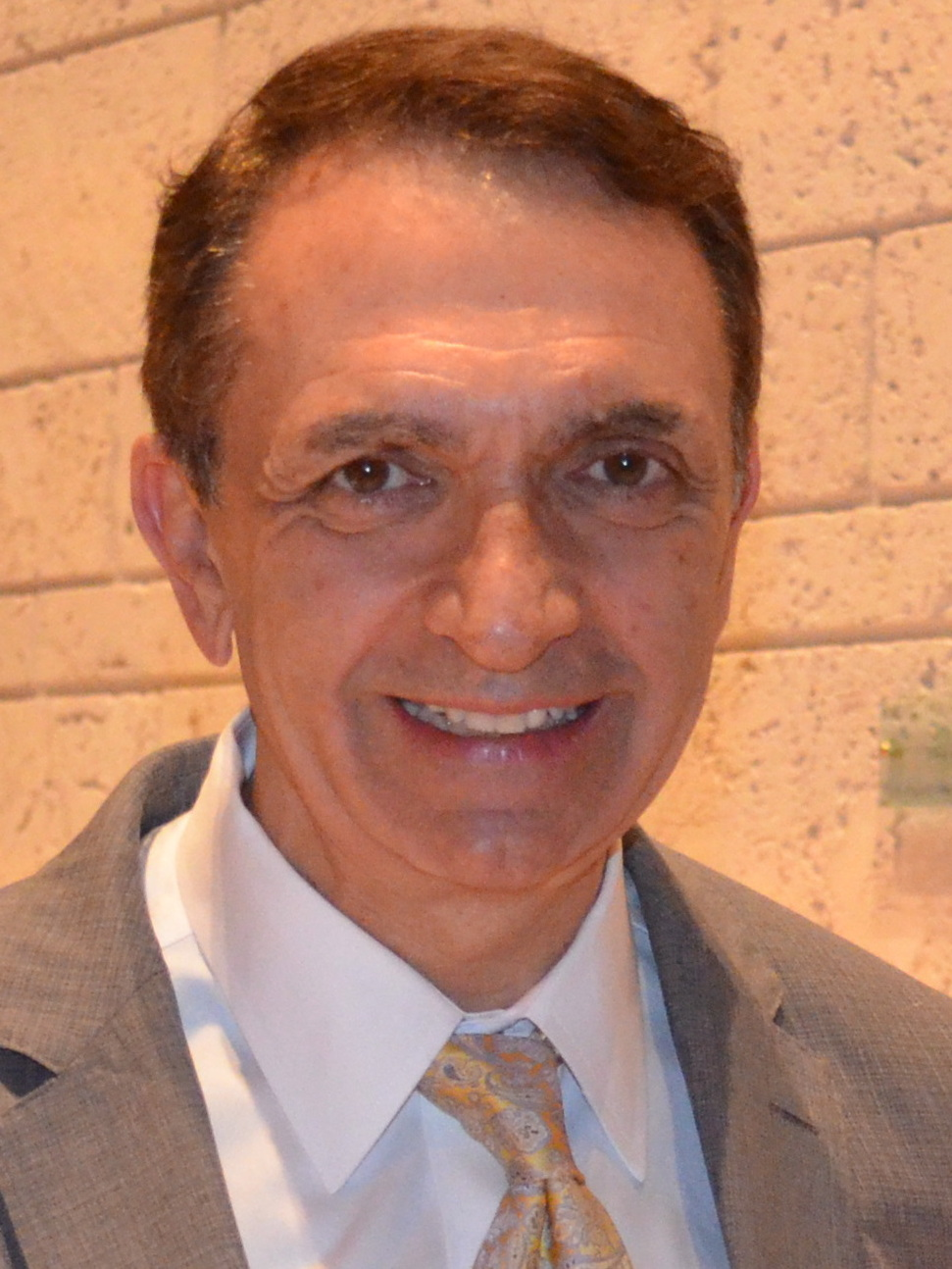

Candidate	Jack Seiler	Dean Trantalis	Earl Rynerson
Popular vote	9,216	3,634	2,458
Percentage	57.28%	22.59%	15.28%
Mayor before election
Jim Naugle
Nonpartisan
Elected Mayor
Jack Seiler
Nonpartisan

The 2009 Fort Lauderdale mayoral election took place on February 10, 2009. Incumbent Mayor Jim Naugle was term limited and could not seek a seventh term in office. Four candidates ran to replace him: State Representative Jack Seiler, former City Commissioner Dean Trantalis, businessman Earl Rynerson, and attorney Steve Rossi. Seiler emerged as the frontrunner, and earned the endorsements of the Miami Herald and the Sun Sentinel. Seiler won the election by a wide margin, receiving 57 percent of the vote.

== Primary election ==
=== Candidates ===
- Jack Seiler, State Representative
- Dean Trantalis, former City Commissioner
- Earl Rynerson, tile store owner
- Steve Rossi, attorney

==== Dropped out ====
- Cindi Hutchinson, City Commissioner

=== Results ===
2009 Fort Lauderdale mayoral election results
Party	Candidate	Votes	%
Nonpartisan	Jack Seiler	9,216	57.28%
Nonpartisan	Dean Trantalis	3,634	22.59%
Nonpartisan	Earl Rynerson	2,458	15.28%
Nonpartisan	Steve Rossi	781	4.85%
Total votes		16,089	100.00%
