= Robert A. Dressler =

American politician (1945–2024)

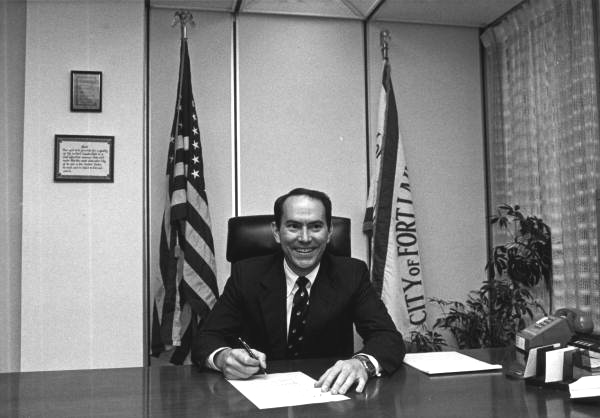
- Dressler at his desk, c. 1984-85

Mayor of Fort Lauderdale, Florida
- In office 1982–1986
- Preceded by: Virginia S. Young
- Succeeded by: Robert O. Cox

Personal details
- Born: August 26, 1945 Fort Lauderdale, Florida, U.S.
- Died: June 17, 2024 (aged 78)
- Education: Dartmouth College (AB); Harvard University (JD)

Robert A. Dressler (August 26, 1945 – June 17, 2024) was an American lawyer and politician. His most prominent public office was mayor of Fort Lauderdale, Florida, from 1982 to 1986.

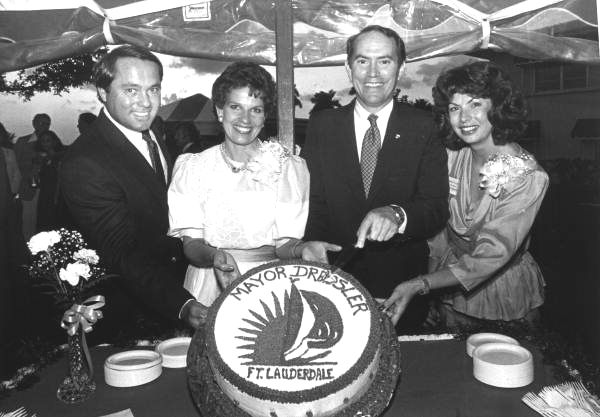
Dressler cutting his birthday cake during a party

== Early life ==
Dressler was born in Fort Lauderdale, Florida, and received his A.B. from Dartmouth College in 1967, cum laude. From 1969 to 1972 he served in the United States Marine Corps, rising to the rank of Captain. He received his J.D. from Harvard University Law School in 1973, cum laude, and was admitted to the bar in Florida, U. S. Court of Appeals for the Fifth Circuit and the U. S. Supreme Court in 1974, the U. S. District Court of Florida, Southern District in 1979, and the U.S. Court of Appeals for the Eleventh Circuit in 1981.

== Political career ==
Dressler was Florida state chairman of the 1980 presidential campaign of US Senator Larry Pressler (R-SD), because the two men had been roommates at Harvard Law School. Pressler competed at the Florida Republican Party’s “Presidency One” convention in Orlando in November 1979, but his campaign ended soon after. In 1980, Dressler was elected to the Broward County Republican Executive Committee.

Dressler was first elected mayor of Fort Lauderdale in 1982, as the first directly elected mayor in the city's history; up until his election, mayors had been appointed by the city commission from among their elected members. He was re-elected to a second three-year term in 1985.

=== Spring break intervention ===
During his second term, the issue of Spring Break revelry and mayhem reached a breaking point. Hundreds of thousands of college students visited the city every spring, destroying hotel rooms, despoiling the beach, and driving away local residents from the beach areas. In 1985, he appeared on Good Morning America and announced that spring break college students were no longer welcome in the city. The city commission, under his leadership, passed laws forbidding open alcoholic containers on the beach side of State Road A1A and overnight parking on the beach. MTV was asked not to set up their operation on the beach, and a heavy enforcement of the new laws resulted in over 2,500 arrests. The new zero-tolerance policy resulted in a sharp drop in college visitors, from an estimated 350,000 students in 1985 to an estimated 60,000 just three years later.

In 1986, Dressler resigned from office to pursue election to the Florida Senate. He was unsuccessful, and returned to private practice as an attorney specializing in trusts and wills; estates; and probate.

== Civic service and recognition ==
From 1982 to 1989, he served on the board of the Greater Fort Lauderdale Chamber of Commerce, and from 1987 to 1993, he was a member of the Board of Regents of the State University System of Florida. He remained active in the community, with involvement in the Rotary Club of Fort Lauderdale, Leadership Florida, the Marine Corps League, and the Vietnam Veterans Association. He was named Florida Man of the Year by Florida Atlantic University in 1993, and 2007 Distinguished Citizen by the Fort Lauderdale City Commission on April 17, 2007.

== Personal life ==
Dressler shared two children, Kathryn and James, with his former wife Patricia. He died on June 17, 2024, at the age of 78.

== Sources ==
- Robert A. Dressler, PA
- Weber, Janelle "Fort Lauderdale says goodbye to wild, youthful spring breaks" Associated Press, March 30, 2001. Accessed May 20, 2007.
- Fort Lauderdale City Commission Minutes, 17 April 2007.

Political offices
Preceded by Virginia S. Young	Mayor of Fort Lauderdale; 1982–1986	Succeeded by Robert O. Cox
