= Clay Shaw (politician) =

American politician (1939–2013)

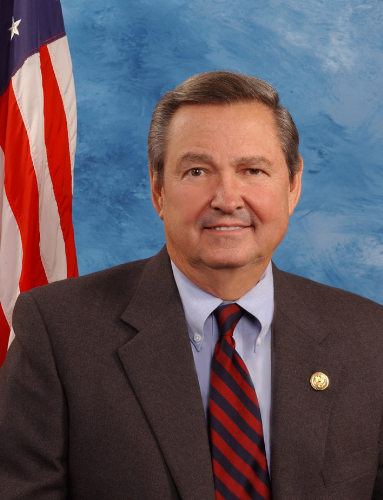

Member of the U.S. House of Representatives from Florida
- In office January 3, 1981 – January 3, 2007
- Preceded by: Edward Stack
- Succeeded by: Ron Klein
- Constituency: 12th district (1981–1983); 15th district (1983–1993); 22nd district (1993–2007)

Mayor of Fort Lauderdale
- In office 1975–1981
- Preceded by: Virginia S. Young
- Succeeded by: Virginia S. Young

Personal details
- Born: Eugene Clay Shaw Jr. April 19, 1939 Miami, Florida, U.S.
- Died: September 10, 2013 (aged 74) Fort Lauderdale, Florida, U.S.
- Party: Republican
- Spouse: Emilie Shaw
- Education: Stetson University; University of Alabama
- Occupation: Judge, accountant

Eugene Clay Shaw Jr. (April 19, 1939 – September 10, 2013) was an American jurist and Republican politician who served as mayor of Fort Lauderdale and represented South Florida in the United States House of Representatives from 1981 until 2007. He was defeated for re-election by Ron Klein in 2006.

== Early life, education, and legal career ==
Shaw was born in Miami, Florida. He graduated in 1957 from Miami Edison Senior High School. He received a bachelor's degree in business in 1961 from Stetson University in Florida, where he joined Sigma Nu fraternity, a master's degree in accounting in 1963 from the University of Alabama, and a law degree in 1966 from Stetson University School of Law. Shaw married the former Emilie Costar on August 22, 1960.

After graduating, Shaw practiced law and worked as a certified public accountant. In 1968, he became assistant city attorney in Fort Lauderdale, Florida. He was chief city prosecutor from 1968 to 1969 and an associate municipal judge from 1969 to 1971.

== Fort Lauderdale politics ==
Shaw was the city commissioner from 1971 to 1973 and vice mayor 1973 to 1975. He then served as mayor of Fort Lauderdale from 1975 to 1981. During his tenure as mayor, Shaw served on the advisory board and executive committee of the U.S. Conference of Mayors, was president of the National Conference of Republican Mayors, and was named special U.S. ambassador to Papua New Guinea by President Gerald Ford.

== U.S. House of Representatives ==
=== Elections ===
1980

The 1980 election cycle provided Republicans with the opportunity to gain Congressional seats. As Ronald Reagan and Jimmy Carter battled for the White House, the National Republican Campaign Committee was actively seeking a Republican candidate in South Florida to challenge freshman Democratic congressman Edward J. Stack. The district, one of the first parts of Florida to turn Republican, had been held by Republican J. Herbert Burke for 12 years before Stack ousted him in 1978. Having been turned down by two potential candidates, including state Senator Van Poole, National Congressional Republicans set their eyes on popular Fort Lauderdale mayor, Clay Shaw.

After multiple attempts to convince Shaw to run for Congress, Shaw agreed. With the support of his wife, Emilie, and four young children, he undertook the task of defeating an incumbent. However, Shaw's candidacy received a significant boost when Stack was upset in the Democratic primary by a young Fort Lauderdale lawyer, Allen Becker. Shaw and Becker faced off in a spirited November general election with Shaw winning 55 percent of the vote. Congressman-elect Shaw was on his way to Washington to represent Broward County's 15th Congressional district. Also in 1980, Ronald Reagan became the 40th president of the United States, and Republicans gained control of the United States Senate.

1982

Redistricting numbered Shaw's district as the 15th District. Shaw faced a rematch against his predecessor, Ed Stack. However, Shaw turned back this challenge fairly easily, winning 57 percent of the vote.

1984

Shaw won re-election with 66% against Democratic nominee Bill Humphrey.

1986

Shaw won re-election without opposition.

1988

Shaw won re-election with 66% against Democratic nominee Mike Kuhle.

1990

Shaw was re-elected without opposition.

1992

In November 1992, Shaw faced his toughest congressional opponent to date. Following the 1990 U.S. census, the Democratic-controlled Florida Legislature reapportioned the state's congressional districts. Shaw's district was renumbered as the 22nd District and significantly altered.

For his first five terms, he had represented a relatively compact district in Broward County. However, it was reconfigured into a district that stretched for 90 miles along the coast, from Juno Beach to the north to Lincoln Road on Miami Beach to the south. His Democratic opponent was State Senate President Gwen Margolis, who had drawn her home in Dade County into the district.

The Shaw–Margolis race was highly competitive. Both campaigns were full of energy and raised thousands of dollars in campaign contributions. The campaigns highlighted the other candidates' records. She claimed that Shaw voted to "decriminalize drugs" while in Washington. Shaw called the claim "an absolute falsehood". She fought back concerns about her involvement with the failed Miami Beach Savings & Loan. In March 1992, the Resolute Trust Corporation filed suit against Margolis and other bank directors claiming they approved speculative loans and were responsible for $4.5 million in losses. In the end, however, Shaw cruised to victory in November, claiming 58% of the general election vote.

1994

Shaw won re-election with 63% of the vote against Democratic nominee Hermine Weiner.

Shaw was a supporter of the Republican Contract with America that helped sweep the Republican Party to control of the United States Congress for the first time in forty years.

1996

Shaw won re-election with 62% of the vote against Democratic nominee Ken Cooper.

1998

Shaw was re-elected unopposed.

2000

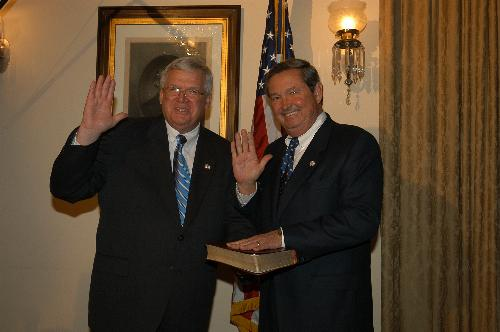
Shaw being sworn in by Speaker Dennis Hastert for the 108th Congress

Seeking his 10th term in Congress, Shaw faced a challenge in state Representative Elaine Bloom. Bloom declared her candidacy in June 1999. Aided by the Democratic presidential ticket of Al Gore and Joe Lieberman, Bloom was making the race competitive.

In early October it was reported that Bloom served on the board of a Florida pharmaceutical company that was accused of price fixing. Bloom denied the accusations, yet press reports, including a piece on Nightline, highlighted the price fixing scandal. Bloom remained on defense for the remainder of the campaign. Ultimately, Shaw won by 599 votes out of more than 220,000 votes cast. It was only the second difficult re-election contest for Shaw. The district, once a Republican-leaning swing district, swung Democratic in the early 1990s along with much of South Florida. In 2000, Al Gore defeated George W. Bush in the district by 52% to 48%.

2002

Following Shaw's extremely close race in 2000, the state legislature, now controlled by Republicans, cut out the heavily Democratic spur of Miami-Dade County that had been added in the 1990s round of redistricting, pushing it further into Palm Beach County. Although the district was friendlier for Shaw than its predecessor, it was only slightly less Democratic than its predecessor (even though Republicans had a small plurality of registered voters). Shaw was re-elected with 61% of the vote against Democrat Carol Roberts, a former Palm Beach County commissioner.

2004

Shaw won re-election with 63% of the vote against a last-minute replacement Democratic candidate, Robin Rorapaugh. His original opponent, Jim Stork, dropped out before the election for medical reasons, but his name remained on the ballot. John Kerry defeated George W. Bush in the district by a margin of 50% to 48%.

2006

Shaw was defeated in the general election by Democratic State Senator Ron Klein, who won by a 51% to 48% margin.

After his 2006 loss, Shaw donated his official Congressional papers (totaling more than 100 linear feet) and memorabilia to his alma mater, Stetson University. The Shaw Collection includes policy notebooks, plaques, awards, videos, letters from U.S. presidents, a number of signed and framed bills with the presidential signing pens, and more than 2,500 photos.

=== Tenure ===
E. Clay Shaw Jr. 17th Street Causeway Bridge

In 2002, the newly constructed 17th Street Causeway bridge reopened to Fort Lauderdale traffic. As a result of federal funding secured by the Congressman Shaw, the Florida Legislature approved a resolution naming the 17th Street bridge the E. Clay Shaw Jr. Bridge.

Missing Children's Act

Swept into office as part of the Reagan Revolution, Shaw quickly found himself at the center of a national tragedy following the death of 7-year-old constituent Adam Walsh. As a result of this tragedy, Shaw introduced the Missing Children's Act of 1982. The legislation allowed parents access to a central computer file designed to trace missing children. President Reagan signed the legislation on October 12, 1982.

Shaw was honored for his efforts and continued support for missing and exploited children in 2004, with other members of Congress, by the Center for Missing and Exploited Children and its founder John Walsh.

Posse Comitatus

As a member of the House Judiciary Committee, Shaw aggressively supported legislation to fight the war on drugs. In fall 1986, Shaw lamented that illegal drugs were "the biggest threat we have ever had to our national security."

To combat the rise of illegal drug trafficking and its impact on Americans, in May 1988 the House of Representatives voted 385 to 23 authorizing 45 days for President Reagan to mobilize U.S. armed forces in the fight against illegal drug trafficking. The legislation required the U.S. military to halt illegal drug trafficking into the southern portions of the United States while requiring the Pentagon to begin aerial radar coverage of the U.S. southern border. The legislation amended the Civil War-era Posse Comitatus Act which prohibited the military from enforcing civilian laws. Calling the overwhelming bipartisan vote the end of a defeatist "Vietnam type mentality toward the war on drugs", Shaw solidified his standing as a leader in the war on drugs.

Welfare reform

Shaw said in 1994, "The inscription at the base of the Statue of Liberty was written before welfare. People come to this country to work. Now the question becomes, Are these handouts a magnet that is bringing people into this country? To some degree, they are."

As a result of the Republican takeover of the United States Congress following the 1994 mid-term elections, Shaw was awarded with his first chairmanship of his Congressional career. As a senior member of the Ways and Means Committee, Shaw was tapped to chair the Human Resources Subcommittee. This move was significant, for included in the Republican Contract with America was a commitment to reform of the nation's welfare system.

Shaw began work on reforming welfare in 1995 by holding numerous committee hearings and public sessions to identify problems within the welfare system. Working with state governors such as Florida Governor Lawton Chiles, Michigan Governor John Engler, Wisconsin Governor Tommy Thompson and Delaware Governor Tom Carper, Shaw began crafting legislation that shifted the federal focus of social welfare to an emphasis on personal responsibility. After two presidential vetoes by President Bill Clinton, welfare reform was finally signed into law on August 22, 1996.

=== Committee assignments ===
House Ways and Means Committee

Shaw was the second most senior Republican on the House Ways and Means committee at the time he left Congress, having assumed that position after Phil Crane lost in his bid for re-election.

Trade subcommittee

From 2005 to 2007, Shaw chaired the Ways and Means Trade subcommittee and was actively involved in the passage of the United States free trade agreement between a number of Central American nations and the Dominican Republic. As chairman, Shaw and his fellow Republicans on the Ways and Means Committee voted the trade agreement out of committee on a straight party line vote.

Shortly thereafter the House passed, by a vote of 217–215, the Dominican Republic Central American Free Trade Agreement (DR-CAFTA) to open U.S. exports up, duty-free, to the Central American nations of the Dominican Republic, Costa Rica, El Salvador, Guatemala, Honduras and Nicaragua. President George W. Bush signed the United States-DR-CAFTA Free Trade Agreement on August 3, 2005, with Shaw and other members of Congress present.

In addition, Shaw was a strong supporter of U.S. export opportunities to the impoverished nation of Haiti.

Social Security Subcommittee

From 1999 to 2005, he was a chairman of the Social Security Subcommittee. As chairman of the Social Security committee, Shaw introduced legislation to repeal the Social Security Earnings Penalty. In March 2000, the House of Representatives, by a vote of 422–0 passed the Social Security Earnings Penalty repeal. Following Senate approval, President Bill Clinton signed the bill into law. The new law allows seniors ages 65 to 69 to continue working without the fear of losing their Social Security benefits.

Human Resources Subcommittee

From 1995 to 1998, Shaw chaired the Human Resources subcommittee. Following the 1994 Republican takeover of Congress, Shaw was named as chair of this important House committee. Having introduced legislation previously to reform welfare, he found himself in a key post to enact much-needed reform. As a result of his efforts, the welfare system was drastically changed and replaced with an emphasis on personal responsibility. Welfare reform was the hallmark of Shaw's congressional career.

Florida Congressional Delegation chairman

Shaw was also the chairman of the Florida delegation from 1996 until leaving office in 2007. In this capacity, Shaw coordinated activities by the delegation including bipartisan delegation meetings. In this capacity, he facilitated discussion amongst Florida colleagues on particular issues or topics and invited special guests to address the delegation including Governor Jeb Bush, Federal Emergency Management Agency Director David Paulison, and federal and state officials.

House 2015 caucus

In 2003, following lung cancer surgery, Shaw, along with Minnesota Congressman Colin Peterson, founded the House 2015 Caucus. The purpose of the 2015 Caucus was to find a cure for cancer or treat it as a manageable disease by 2015. Members of the caucus expressed their desire to eliminate cancer disease and suffering by 2015.

Shaw was also a member of the Congressional Arts Caucus, Congressional Fire Services Caucus, Congressional Narcotics Abuse and Control Caucus, Congressional Social Security Caucus, Congressional Travel and Tourism Caucus, Friends of Ireland, Law Enforcement Caucus and Renewable Energy and Energy Efficiency Caucus. He was also the co-chair of the Congressional Boating Caucus, Congressional Coastal Caucus and International Conservation Caucus.

== Post-congressional career ==
In 2007, following his departure from Congress, Shaw provided his entire Congressional collection to his alma mater, Stetson University. The Shaw collection is housed at the university's duPont-Ball library in DeLand, Florida.

In 2008, Clay Shaw was named a Great Floridian by the Florida Department of State, an honor extended to individuals who made major contributions to the progress and welfare of the state of Florida. Shaw's honor was advocated by state House Representative Adam Hasner (R-Delray Beach). Clay Shaw remained active in the Ft. Lauderdale community, including chairing a celebration of Ft. Lauderdale's founding.

== Personal life ==
Shaw and his wife Emilie had four children: Emilie "Mimi" Carter, Jennifer Wilder, E. Clay Shaw III and J.C. Shaw, and 15 grandchildren: Charles Wyatt Carter, Emilie Martin, Rita Carter, Casey Carter, Keeley Iriondo, Ashton Brown, Hogan Wilder, Chandler Wilder, Reagan Shaw, E. Clay Shaw IV, David Baker Shaw, Hampton Shaw, Dakota Shaw, McGregor Shaw and Keegan Shaw.

Shaw died September 10, 2013, of lung cancer. He was 74. He is buried in Cuba, Alabama.

== See also ==
- Personal Responsibility and Work Opportunity Act

Political offices
Preceded by Virginia S. Young	Mayor of Fort Lauderdale, Florida; 1975–1981	Succeeded by Virginia S. Young
U.S. House of Representatives
Preceded by Edward J. Stack	Member of the U.S. House of Representatives from Florida's 12th congressional district 1981–1983	Succeeded by Tom Lewis
Preceded by Dante Fascell	Member of the U.S. House of Representatives from Florida's 15th congressional district 1983–1993	Succeeded by Jim Bacchus
Preceded by District Created after 1990 Census	Member of the U.S. House of Representatives from Florida's 22nd congressional district 1993–2007	Succeeded by Ron Klein
