= George Matthews =

George Matthews may refer to:

- George Matthews (soldier) (1726–1798), soldier and signatory of the 1790 Pennsylvania Constitution
- George E. Matthews (1855–1911), American publisher of the Buffalo Courier-Express
- George Matthews (musician) (1912–1982), American jazz trombonist
- George Matthews (journalist) (1917–2005), British political activist and editor of The Morning Star
- George Matthews (broadcaster), contemporary Canadian radio ice hockey commentator

== See also ==
- George Mathews (disambiguation)
