= Edward J. Stack =

American politician

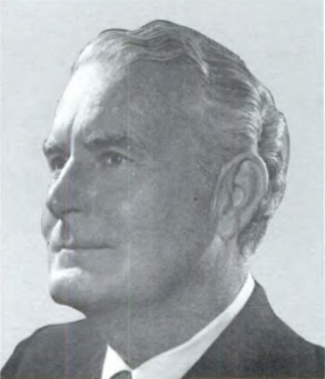

Member of the U.S. House of Representatives from Florida's 12th district
- In office January 3, 1979 – January 3, 1981
- Preceded by: J. Herbert Burke
- Succeeded by: E. Clay Shaw Jr.

Sheriff of Broward County
- In office 1968–1978
- Preceded by: Thomas Walker
- Succeeded by: Bob Butterworth

Personal details
- Born: Edward John Stack; April 29, 1910 Bayonne, New Jersey, U.S.
- Died: November 3, 1989 (aged 79) Pompano Beach, Florida
- Party: Democratic
- Education: Lehigh University (BA); University of Pennsylvania (JD); Columbia University (MA)

Edward John Stack (April 29, 1910 – November 3, 1989) was a member of the United States House of Representatives from Florida.

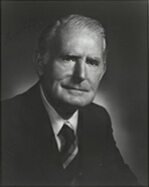
Edward J. Stack

Born in Bayonne, New Jersey, to Irish immigrants, Stack attended the public schools and received a B.A. from Lehigh University in Bethlehem, Pennsylvania, in 1931. He went on to earn a J.D. from the University of Pennsylvania Law School in 1934 and a M.A. in public law and government from Columbia University in 1938. He was an instructor in economics at Hunter College of the City University of New York.

Stack was admitted to the New York bar in 1934 and commenced practice in New York City. He worked as a builder, real estate investor, and engaged in the banking profession. He served in the United States Coast Guard from 1942 to 1946 and became a lieutenant (junior grade).

Stack served as commissioner-mayor of Pompano Beach, Florida, from 1965 to 1969 and sheriff of Broward County from 1968 to 1978. He was a delegate to the Florida State Democratic conventions from 1977 to 1978 and served as member of the Democratic National Finance Council from 1976 to 1978. Stack was elected as a Democrat to the Ninety-sixth Congress (January 3, 1979 – January 3, 1981). He was an unsuccessful candidate for renomination in 1980 to the Ninety-seventh Congress. He resumed the practice of law. He was an unsuccessful candidate for election to the Ninety-eighth Congress in 1982.

Stack was a resident of Pompano Beach, until his death on November 3, 1989.

U.S. House of Representatives
| Preceded by J. Herbert Burke | Member of the U.S. House of Representatives from Florida's 12th congressional district January 3, 1979 – January 3, 1981 | Succeeded by E. Clay Shaw Jr. |
