= Jack Seiler =

American politician

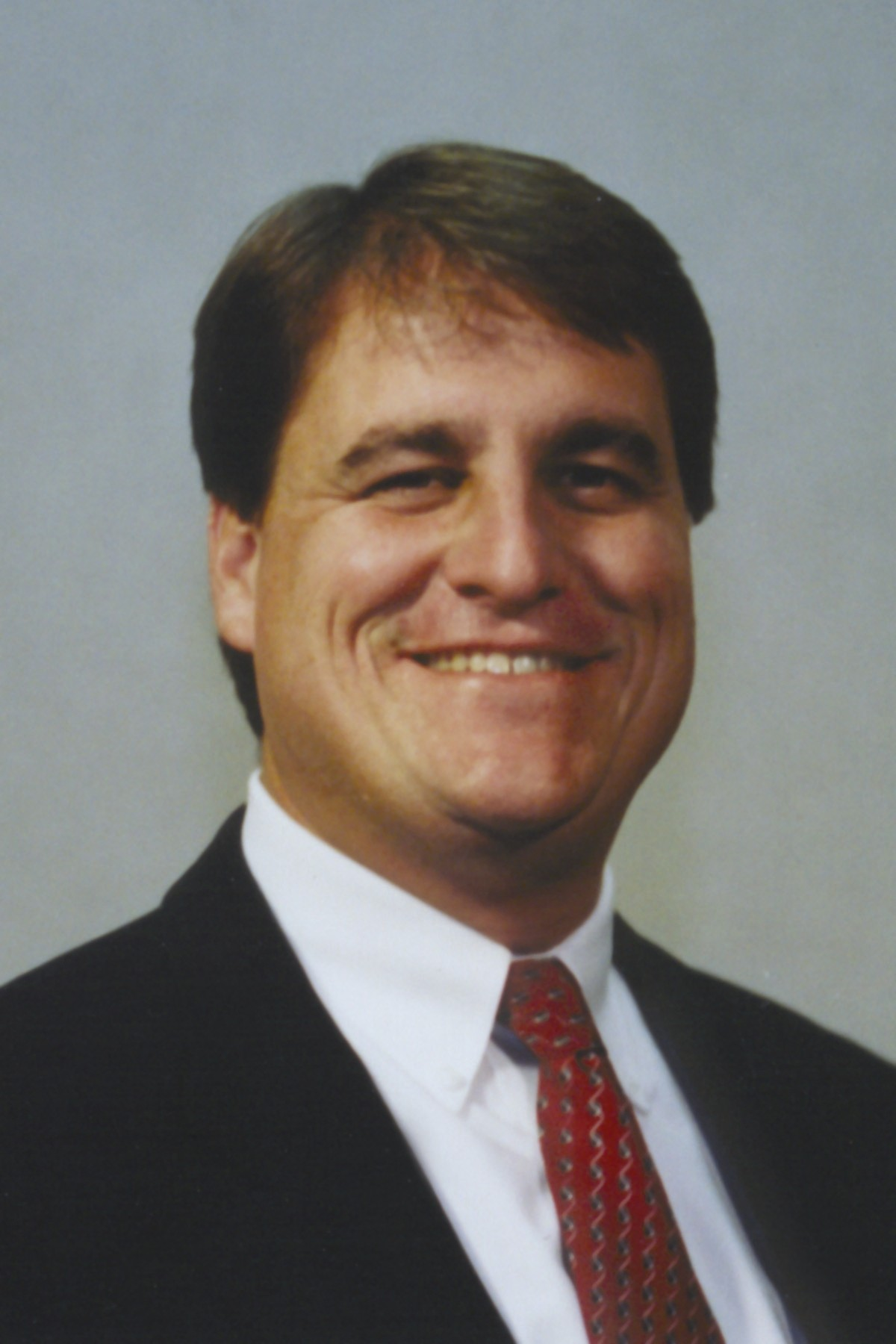

41st Mayor of Fort Lauderdale
- In office March 17, 2009 – March 20, 2018
- Preceded by: Jim Naugle
- Succeeded by: Dean Trantalis

Member of the Florida House of Representatives from the 92nd district
- In office January 2001 – January 2009
- Preceded by: Tracy Stafford
- Succeeded by: Gwyndolen Clarke-Reed

Mayor of Wilton Manors
- In office 1998–2000
- Preceded by: King Wilkinson
- Succeeded by: John Fiore

Personal details
- Born: John P. Seiler; May 27, 1963 (age 63) Fort Collins, Colorado, U.S.
- Party: Democratic
- Spouse: Susan Rimes
- Children: Marianna; Jacqueline; Preston; Susanne
- Education: University of Notre Dame (BBA); University of Miami (JD)
- Occupation: Attorney

John P. Seiler (born May 27, 1963) is an American politician and 41st Mayor of Fort Lauderdale, Florida. Prior to this he was a Democratic member of the Florida House of Representatives, from 2000 to 2008 representing District 92 which is located in Broward County, Florida.

== Political career ==
=== Wilton Manors ===
Seiler moved to Wilton Manors, Florida, around 1988. Seiler served as city council member and then vice mayor of Wilton Manors from 1993 to 1998. In 1998, Seiler was elected mayor of Wilton Manors, defeating incumbent King Wilkinson who had been accused of making homophobic comments.

=== Fort Lauderdale ===
Seiler was a candidate to succeed term-limited Jim Naugle in the 2009 mayoral election for Fort Lauderdale, Florida. He was elected February 10, 2009, winning against three opponents with more than 57 percent of the vote, avoiding a run-off election. Analysis of the race suggests Seiler won because of high name recognition and strong fundraising that exceeded $250,000. Seiler was sworn in March 17, 2009.

On January 31, 2012, Seiler was reelected with 75% of the vote in a three-way race.

In 2015 he was again reelected.

==== Homeless initiatives ====
In November 2014, Seiler received nationwide attention; reports that Arnold Abbott, a 90-year-old World War II veteran had been arrested for feeding the homeless in public, in Fort Lauderdale went viral. The New York Times reported that "Fort Lauderdale, despite a reputation for being more progressive than most Florida cities on homelessness, passed a series of measures that surprised and drew the ire of homeless activists." The measure further restricting food distribution in public places but loosened restrictions on feeding in private or religious buildings. Other new measures tightened restrictions on panhandling, having property and sleeping in public, but the Mayor says his city is not harsh on homeless people, reported the Times. While video available on YouTube shows Arnold Abbott and ministers being taken away in police custody, the Mayor states that Mr Arnold had not been arrested, but rather was detained, cited, and ordered to appear in court. Those cited face possible jail time and have taken the city to court to fight the ordinance.

Political offices
Preceded by Jim Naugle	Mayor of Fort Lauderdale; 2009–2018	Succeeded by Dean Trantalis
