= George G. Mathews Jr. =

American politician and diplomat

Mayor of Fort Lauderdale, Florida
- In office 1913–1914
- Preceded by: W.H. Marshall
- Succeeded by: Dr. C.G. Holland

United States consulate at Pará, Brazil
- In office 1893–1897

Personal details
- Born: January 29, 1855 Monroe County, Alabama
- Died: March 1944 (aged 89) Fort Lauderdale, Florida
- Spouse: Sarah Hybart
- Relations: Mathews family
- Occupation: Diplomat; Politician

George Green Mathews Jr. (January 29, 1855 - March 1944) was an American diplomat and politician. He served as U.S. Consul at Pará, Brazil from 1893 to 1897, and on his return to the United States was a Florida State Representative and the 2nd mayor of Fort Lauderdale from 1913 to 1914.

== Early life ==
George G. Mathews was born on January 29, 1855, in Monroe County, Alabama, to Dr. George G. Mathews and Sarah Hybart. His father, a great-grandson of general George Mathews, removed his young family from Georgia to South America following the American Civil War when George Jr. was an adolescent and spent 23 years in Brazil before returning to the United States in 1881. Having spent most of his early life there, George Jr. was fluent in Portuguese and familiar with Brazilian customs.

== United States consulate ==
President Grover Cleveland appointed him United States consulate at Pará, Brazil, a position he held throughout President Cleveland's presidency of 1893-1897. Cleveland sought to forge new business relations with Brazil, and Mathews reported on business opportunities, specifically in paper manufacturing.

== Later life ==
On his return to the United States he settled in Fort Lauderdale, Florida, and translated his knowledge of the paper industry into private business success, publishing several local newspapers before founding the Fort Lauderdale "Sentinel" in 1910. He played a prominent part in the political life of Fort Lauderdale, serving as a Florida State Representative for the city and serving on its City Council when that body was formed in 1912. He served as the 2nd mayor of Fort Lauderdale from 1913 to 1914. He died in Fort Lauderdale in 1944.
