= J. Herbert Burke =

American politician (1911–1993)

Herbert Burke
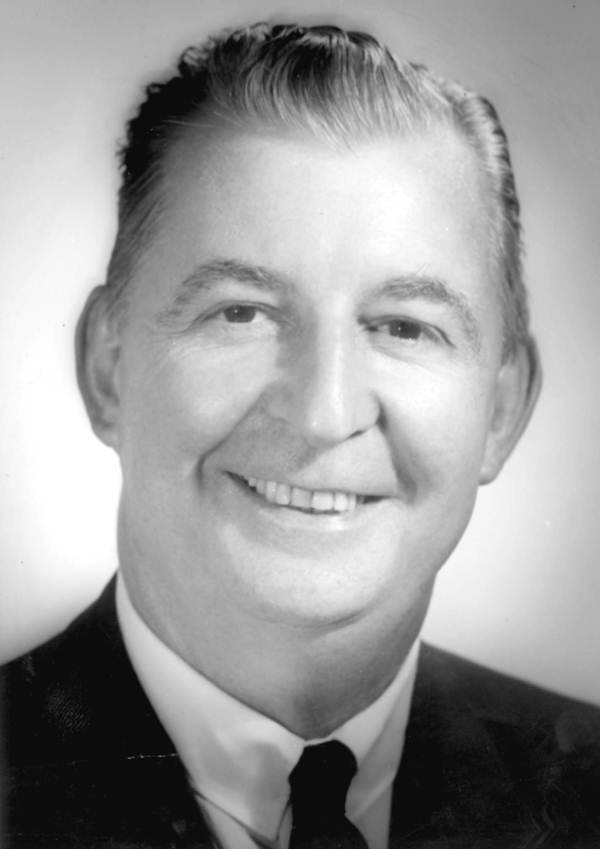

Member of the U.S. House of Representatives from Florida
- In office January 3, 1967 – January 3, 1979
- Preceded by: District established (redistricting)
- Succeeded by: Edward J. Stack
- Constituency: 10th district (1967–1973); 12th district (1973–1979)

Personal details
- Born: January 14, 1911 Chicago, Illinois, U.S.
- Died: June 16, 1993 (aged 82) Altamonte Springs, Florida, U.S.
- Party: Republican
- Spouse: Evelyn Krumtinger
- Education: Central YMCA College; Northwestern University (BA); Illinois Institute of Technology (LLB)

J. Herbert Burke (January 14, 1911 – June 16, 1993) was a Republican U.S. representative from Florida who served from 1967 to 1979.

== History ==
He was born in Chicago, where he attended the public schools, the defunct Central YMCA College, and then Northwestern University in nearby Evanston. He later graduated from Kent College of Law in Chicago.

Burke served in the United States Army in France during World War II, and was awarded the Purple Heart and the Bronze Star. He also earned the European Theater Medal and the American Theater Ribbon, and was discharged with the rank of captain.

== Career ==
He was admitted to the bar in 1940 and practiced in Chicago from 1940 to 1949, and in Hollywood, Florida, from 1949 to 1968. In 1952, Burke was elected Republican commissioner in Broward County and served in that capacity until 1967. He was a Republican State committeeman from 1954 to 1958. He was an unsuccessful candidate for election to the Eighty-fourth Congress in a special election held on January 11, 1955, losing to Democrat Paul Rogers.

Burke served as delegate to Republican National Conventions in 1968, 1972, and 1976. In 1968, he was a member of the Republican Platform Committee. In 1956, he was appointed by U.S. President Dwight D. Eisenhower to the Southeastern Advisory Board of Small Business.

Burke was elected to the Ninetieth and to the five succeeding Congresses (January 3, 1967 – January 3, 1979). Burke voted in favor of the Civil Rights Act of 1968.

== Scandal ==
On May 27, 1978, Burke was arrested at the Centerfold Bar in Dania, Florida, on charges of disorderly intoxication and resisting arrest. Burke claimed he had come to the club in an attempt to prevent a narcotics deal. He later pleaded guilty to the charges and nolo contendere to an additional charge of witness tampering and sentenced to three months of probation and a $177.50 fine.

The incident later became the basis for the novel Strip Tease, which was made into a film starring Burt Reynolds and Demi Moore.

== Election ==
Despite the arrest, Burke ran for reelection in 1978 to the Ninety-sixth Congress. He lost in a landslide to Democrat Edward J. Stack.

After leaving Congress, he resided in Falls Church, Virginia, and Fern Park, Florida, until his death in 1993 in Altamonte Springs, Florida.

== See also ==
- List of American federal politicians convicted of crimes
- List of federal political scandals in the United States
- List of members of the House Un-American Activities Committee

U.S. House of Representatives
| Preceded by Sam Gibbons | Member of the U.S. House of Representatives from Florida's 10th congressional district 1967–1973 | Succeeded by Louis A. Bafalis |
| Preceded by Dante Fascell | Member of the U.S. House of Representatives from Florida's 12th congressional district 1973–1979 | Succeeded by Edward J. Stack |
