= Jim Naugle =

American politician

James T. Naugle
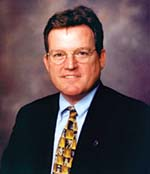

40th Mayor of Fort Lauderdale
- In office 1991 – March 17, 2009
- Preceded by: Robert O. Cox
- Succeeded by: Jack Seiler

Personal details
- Born: 1954 Fort Lauderdale, Florida, U.S.
- Party: Democratic
- Spouse: Carol-Lisa Phillips (1963)
- Children: Rachel Elizabeth (1998)
- Education: Florida Atlantic University
- Occupation: Politician
- Profession: Real estate broker
- Website: JimNaugle.com

James T. Naugle (born 1954) is an American real estate broker who served as mayor of Fort Lauderdale, Florida. Although a lifelong Democrat, Naugle frequently voted for and supported Republican candidates. Elected for the first time in 1991, Naugle was the longest-serving mayor in the history of Fort Lauderdale, serving for six consecutive terms.

During his tenure as a mayor, the revitalization of the beach area and Las Olas Boulevard occurred, Riverwalk was created, the Museum of Discovery and Science was opened as was the Broward Center for the Performing Arts and he takes credit for changing Fort Lauderdale tourist mix from Spring Break college students to families. He is well known for several controversies with gays, the American Civil Liberties Union, and the South Florida Sun-Sentinel.

== Biography ==
=== Early life and career ===
Jim Naugle was born in Fort Lauderdale in 1954. Son of a paint retailer, he studied in a Lutheran school in his early years. His mother was a member of Phi Mu, a national women's fraternity. Naugle presented Phi Mu with a key to the city in 2000, when they held their National Convention there.

Naugle asserts that his first business experiences were selling fruitcakes for the Cub Scouts and working after school with his father. Naugle said that his first political experience was as campaign manager for Barry Goldwater while studying at Peters Elementary during the 1964 presidential race, "cutting elephants and things like that".

His favorite hobby when a teenager was kart racing, having participated in national competitions. He worked as a painter while attending Stranahan High School. When he went to Broward Community College, he completed a real estate course in 1974 and left the painting business he owned.

Naugle obtained a Bachelor of Arts degree in Business Administration from Florida Atlantic University in 1975.

=== Marriage and children ===
Naugle has been married to Carol-Lisa Phillips (born 1963) since 1993 and has one daughter, Rachel Elizabeth (born 1998). Judge Carol-Lisa Phillips was appointed to the 17th Judicial Circuit, which serves Broward County, in 2003.

== Political career ==
Jim Naugle started in politics as a member of Fort Lauderdale city boards in 1976. Elected city commissioner in 1985, he ran for city mayor and was elected in 1991.

Fort Lauderdale has a Commission-Manager form of government. City policy is set by a city commission of five elected members: the mayor and four district commission members. The mayor of Fort Lauderdale serves a three-year term and cannot serve more than three consecutive terms. Naugle's first three terms were not affected by the municipal code, which was amended in 1998; the limitation went into effect in March 2000. Administrative functions are performed by a city manager, who is appointed by the city commission.

During his tenure as a mayor, the revitalization of the beach area and Las Olas Boulevard occurred, Riverwalk was created, the Museum of Discovery and Science was opened as was the Broward Center for the Performing Arts and he takes credit for changing Fort Lauderdale tourist mix from Spring Break college students to families.

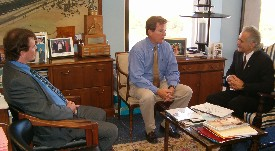
Jim Naugle meeting with his aides in 2004

== Political views ==
Naugle has been a registered Democrat since he was 18, but he frequently supports Republican candidates. He co-chaired George W. Bush's Presidential campaign in 2000 and Jeb Bush's bid for governor in 1998. In past presidential elections, he supported Richard Nixon, Gerald Ford, Ronald Reagan, George H. W. Bush and Bob Dole—all Republicans. Described as a "renegade Democrat" by The Washington Post, he said in 2000 that he votes for the candidate, not just the party. He contributed $1,000 to Fred Thompson in the 2008 Republican Presidential primary race. Asked why he never became a Republican, he said that as a non-partisan office holder, he did not see a reason to change, but that he would have to do "some soul-searching" if he ran for other offices. He qualifies himself as very conservative and willing to limit government.

== Controversy ==
Naugle has said that the American Civil Liberties Union acronym ACLU means "Atheists and Criminal Lobbying Union" and that a proposal for reducing greenhouse gases was "hate-America stuff" concocted by "a bunch of scientists meeting in Paris who've had too much wine." He has noted his working relationship with gay-rights activist Robin Bodiford as an example of his tolerance of differing viewpoints. Comments Naugle made about alleged use of a planned $250,000 robotic toilet in Fort Lauderdale's beach to prevent sexual encounters between men caused protests from the local community.

Naugle has had a long-running dispute with his constituency's largest regional newspaper, the South Florida Sun-Sentinel; he has claimed it should be called Rainbow Sentinel because of what he perceives as a majority of gay people on its staff, or Scum-Sentinel because they are "an advertising tabloid newsblog". He has stated "the day I take advice from a company that has vagrants selling their products in the middle of the street, we're all in trouble", referring to the publication's practice of employing homeless people as street salespeople.

Naugle denounced the LGBT Stonewall Library & Archives in 2007, because it contained pornographic materials. Executive Director Jack Rutland noted that the three titles singled out by Naugle were all part of the library's non-circulating archive of 7000 titles, maintained for historical and research purposes only. On July 10, 2007, the Fort Lauderdale city commission voted to allow the library to occupy a space in a building that is city-owned, but under long-term lease to Broward county. On August 28, 2007 the Broward (County) Tourism Development Council expelled Naugle due to his controversial remarks against the gay community. Estimates indicate that gay visitors pump approximately $1 billion in revenue into Broward County annually.

Naugle suggested that Bill Clinton should be investigated for raping Monica Lewinsky.

== See also ==
- List of mayors of Fort Lauderdale
- 1991 Fort Lauderdale mayoral election
- 1994 Fort Lauderdale mayoral election
- 1997 Fort Lauderdale mayoral election
- 2000 Fort Lauderdale mayoral election
- 2003 Fort Lauderdale mayoral election
- 2006 Fort Lauderdale mayoral election

Political offices
Preceded by Robert O. Cox	Mayor of Fort Lauderdale; 1991-2009	Succeeded by Jack Seiler
