= Virginia S. Young =

American politician (1917–1994)

Virginia Shuman Young (1917 – December 6, 1994) was a Fort Lauderdale politician, serving elected terms to the Broward County School Board, and the Fort Lauderdale City Commission. During her time on the City Commission, she served twice as Mayor (1973–1975, 1981–1982) and as Vice-Mayor from 1971–1973 and 1975-1981.

== Early life ==
Virginia Shuman was born in Norfolk, Virginia, the daughter of a tugboat captain, Irving G. Shuman "Cap". In 1926, her parents moved back to Fort Lauderdale. Her maternal grandparents, the Dewitt G.TenBrooks, had moved to Fort Lauderdale in 1910 from New York. Her mother, Myrtle Tenbrook, was raised in Fort Lauderdale. Her grandmother, Frances TenBrook was a leader in the Fort Lauderdale women's suffrage movement. Grandfather Dewitt Tenbrook was the city's first chief of Police. The TenBrooks were one of the founding families of Fort Lauderdale as listed on the city charter when the city was incorporated in 1911.

== Career ==
She married George Fenwick Young, who was the owner of a successful construction business and served as president of the Fort Lauderdale Woman's Club from 1944 to 1946. In 1953 she was elected to the Broward County Board of Education where she led the fight to have the board abolished, and was successful when the board was merged into the Broward County School Board in 1957. She successfully ran for a seat on the School Board the following year, and served as a member until 1966, including two one-year terms as Chairwoman (1961 and 1965). After losing her re-election bid for the School board in 1965, she ran for State Legislator and Supervisor of the Board of Elections as a candidate for the Democratic Party, and lost both times. In 1971, she ran for a seat on the Fort Lauderdale City Commission, and was successful. The commissioners appointed her as Vice Mayor. In 1973, she was appointed by the commission as Mayor, becoming the first (and as of 2010, only) female mayor in the city's history. In 1975, she was appointed as Vice-Mayor, under E. Clay Shaw, Jr. When Shaw resigned in 1981 to run for congress, Young was again appointed to serve as Mayor. She continued to serve on the city commission until 1985, when she declined to run again. Her husband's death in 1983 played a role in her decision. She did not retire from public life, however, as she served on the Downtown Development Authority from 1986 until 1993. She was often at odds with the other members of the Authority, as she was concerned with the preservation of historic buildings in the city's downtown area.

== Legacy ==
She died in her daughter's home in El Dorado, Arkansas, on December 6, 1994, at the age of 77.

Virginia Shuman Young Elementary School opened just blocks from downtown Fort Lauderdale in August, 1994.
