= Dean Trantalis =

American politician (born 1953)

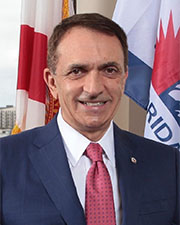
- Official portrait, 2021

42nd Mayor of Fort Lauderdale
- Incumbent
- Assumed office March 20, 2018
- Preceded by: Jack Seiler

Member of the Fort Lauderdale City Commission
- In office March 17, 2013 – March 20, 2018
- In office 2003–2006

Personal details
- Born: October 14, 1953 (age 73) Norwich, Connecticut, U.S.
- Party: Democratic
- Education: Boston University (BA); Stetson University (JD)

Dean J. Trantalis (born October 14, 1953) is an American politician and lawyer serving as the 42nd mayor of Fort Lauderdale since 2018. A member of the Democratic Party, he is the first openly gay mayor in the history of Fort Lauderdale. Trantalis previously served as a city commissioner of Fort Lauderdale from 2009 to 2017.

== Biography ==
Trantalis was born and raised in Norwich, Connecticut, from Greek parents. He attended high school at Norwich Free Academy. At Boston University, he majored in political science and graduated cum laude and with distinction in 1975. He received a Juris Doctor (J.D.) in 1979 from Stetson University College of Law, while completing international law courses in Eastern Europe, Russia, and London.

Dean was admitted to the Connecticut and Florida Bar Associations in 1980 and has practiced law in Broward County since 1982.

== Political career ==
=== Fort Lauderdale City Commissioner (2003–2006) ===
Trantalis was elected to the Fort Lauderdale City Commission in 2003, and served until 2006. He was the city's first openly gay commissioner.

=== Fort Lauderdale City Commission (2013–2018) ===
Trantalis was elected to the Fort Lauderdale City Commission in a 2013 special election, defeating then-incumbent Charlotte Rodstrom, who instead ran for County Commission. He won the 2015 general election without much opposition.

==== Law against feeding homeless ====
The City of Fort Lauderdale made international news when the commission voted to outlaw feeding the homeless. Trantalis voted against the ordinance, causing a major rift between himself and the commission. There was international outrage when a 93-year-old man, Arnold Abbot, was arrested for feeding the homeless. The City passed another feeding ban in 2017, despite public outcry. In 2016, the U.S. Department of Justice announced that it would probe Broward County and the City of Fort Lauderdale, in response to the homeless sharing ordinances. Trantalis has vowed that as Mayor, he would not enforce the ordinance.

==== Development ====
Trantalis has been an early opponent of overdevelopment in the coastal city. On the commission, he voted against many of the development proposals. In 2017, he voted against the controversial Bahia Mar development proposal.

=== Fort Lauderdale Mayor (2018-present) ===
==== Mayoral election, 2018 ====
The 2018 race for mayor of Fort Lauderdale was said to be the city's most heated election. Trantalis announced his intent to run for mayor late in October 2017. The election became about pressing issues such as development, infrastructure, traffic, and special interests. "Our infrastructure needs have reached a crisis level, and now we are discovering that mismanagement of city funds only made the situation worse", said Trantalis in a Sun Sentinel questionnaire. On January 12, 2018, Trantalis campaign staffer Elijah Manley was arrested by the Fort Lauderdale Police Department. Manley was accused of tampering with campaign signs. On This Week in South Florida, Trantalis defended Manley, saying that it could have been because of a mistaken identity. Manley accused the Fort Lauderdale Police Department of a "politically motivated" arrest and bias for their former boss, Bruce Roberts, who was running against Trantalis. Trantalis and Roberts exceed to a March 2018 runoff. Trantalis handily defeated Bruce Roberts, with a 64% landslide in the March 13, 2018, General Election runoff. Trantalis is the first openly gay person to be elected Mayor of Fort Lauderdale.

==== Water and sewer infrastructure Crises ====
Trantalis' first term as Mayor has been marred by a growing infrastructure crisis in the City of Fort Lauderdale. The crisis has been partially blamed on the City's practice of diverting money from the water and sewer infrastructure fund to other projects. Since 2012, the City siphoned off at least $106 million from the fund. In 2019, Trantalis falsely claimed to have ended the process later clarifying that "We are weaning ourselves out of it." The process was later rejected by state officials with Florida Department of Environmental Protection Secretary Valenstein stating, "Our message is simple: Engaging in the practice of diverting utility funds and sending that money elsewhere is no way to mitigate, monitor or address the issue of aging infrastructure." Trantalis later responded saying "We will get cited. There's nothing we can do about that." Trantalis has also been criticized for his lone vote against a $200 million sewer repair bond claiming he did not understand the "full scope" of the project and doubted the need to borrow such a large sum despite the City's Comprehensive Utilities Strategic Master Plan outlining the need for over $1.4 billion in repairs. In 2020, the sewage crisis ballooned into an environmental disaster after over 211,000,000 gallons of sewage spilled into the City's waterways. The State of Florida Department of Environmental Protection has fined the City over $2.1 million—the largest in State history—as a result of the City's poor handling of the crises.

==== Flooding ====
On April 12, 2023, an "unprecedented" more than two feet of rain fell on Fort Lauderdale, "flooding roads, swamping cars and stranding travelers" An additional two to three more inches of rain fell on April 13, 2023. City officials had said Fort Lauderdale's stormwater system was built to handle three inches of rain within 24 hours, far less than what this storm brought.

Florida Governor Ron DeSantis was in Ohio when the storm hit, at an event for his national book tour. On April 13, 2023, DeSantis issued Executive Order 23-65, declaring a state of emergency for Broward County due to severe flooding and rainfall. During a press conference on April 14, 2023, Trantalis said that Governor Ron DeSantis had not yet called him, further stating "I’m not sure what’s going on but I’m sure that he’s, uh, very interested in what’s going on here and we’re happy to work with his office." Trantalis did say that he had heard from Transportation Secretary Pete Buttigieg, U.S. Rep. Debbie Wasserman Schultz of Broward County, and Florida CFO Jimmy Patronis.

== Personal life ==
Trantalis resides in Fort Lauderdale, Florida. He graduated with a Juris Doctor degree from Stetson University College of Law in St. Petersburg, Florida. He practices real estate law, and has his own private practice firm in real estate law.

Political offices
Preceded by Jack Seiler	Mayor of Fort Lauderdale; 2018–present	Incumbent
