= List of mayors of Fort Lauderdale, Florida =

The Mayor of Fort Lauderdale serves a three-year term, no greater than six consecutive terms, for a maximum of eighteen years.

== Mayor-Council Government (1912–1925) ==
Mayor was appointed from the Council.

- 1912–1913 W.H. Marshall
- 1913–1914 George G. Mathews Jr.
- 1914–1915 Dr. C.G. Holland
- 1916–1918 Will J. Reed
- 1918 James S. Richard
- 1918–1919 Will J. Reed
- 1919–1923 C.E. Farrington
- 1922–1924 R. G. Snow
- 1924–1925 Will J. Reed

== Mayor-Commission Government (1925–1982) ==
Mayor was appointed from the Commission for a two-year term

- 1925–1927 J.W. Tidball
- 1927–1929 C.D. Kittridge
- 1929–1931 T.E. Haskins
- 1931–1933 J.W. Needham
- 1933–1934 E.A. Pychon (resigned 1934)
- 1934–1935 M.A. Hortt
- 1935–1937 Lewis E. Moore
- 1937–1939 Thomas B. Manuel
- 1939–1941 Lewis E. Moore
- 1941–1942 H. L. McCann (resigned 1942)
- 1942–1943 N.B. Cheaney
- 1943–1945 Joe N. Morris
- 1945–1947 H.C.Holden
- 1947–1949 Reed A. Bryan
- 1949–1951 F.R. Humphries
- 1951–1953 Lewis E. Moore (resigned 1953)
- 1953–1955 C. Malcolm Carlisle
- 1955–1957 Porter G. Reynolds
- 1957–1960 John V. Russell (resigned 1960)
- 1960–1961 Edward H. Johns
- 1961–1963 Edmund R. Burry
- 1963–1965 Melvin R. "Cy" Young
- 1965–1969 Edmund R. Burry
- 1969–1971 F. Peter Clements
- 1971–1973 James L. Leavitt
- 1973–1975 Virginia S. Young
- 1975–1981 E. Clay Shaw, Jr.
- 1981–1982 Virginia S. Young

== Mayor-Commission Government (1982 - present) ==
Mayor is elected in citywide race, serving a maximum of 6 terms, each consisting of 3 years.

- 1982–1986 Robert A. Dressler
- 1986–1991 Robert O. "Bob" Cox
- 1991–2009 James T. "Jim" Naugle
- 2009–2018 John P. "Jack" Seiler
- 2018–present Dean Trantalis

== See also ==
- Timeline of Fort Lauderdale, Florida
